= Health care prices in the United States =

Market and non-market factors that determine pricing

The prices of health care in the United States are higher than in other countries. Compared to other OECD countries, U.S. healthcare costs are one-third higher or more relative to the size of the economy (GDP). According to the CDC, during 2015, health expenditures per-person were nearly $10,000 on average, with total expenditures of $3.2 trillion or 17.8% of GDP. Proximate reasons for the differences with other countries include higher prices for the same services (i.e., a higher price per unit) and greater use of healthcare (i.e., more units consumed). Higher administrative costs, higher per-capita income, and less government intervention to drive down prices are deeper causes. While the annual inflation rate in healthcare costs has declined in recent decades, it still remains above the rate of economic growth, resulting in a steady increase in healthcare expenditures relative to GDP from 6% in 1970 to nearly 18% in 2015.

== Nature of the healthcare markets ==
=== Coverage ===
Health insurance coverage is provided by several public and private sources in the United States. During 2016, the U.S. population overall was approximately 325 million, with 53 million persons 65 years of age and older covered by the federal Medicare program. The 272 million non-institutional persons under age 65 either obtained their coverage from employer-based (155 million) or non-employer based (90 million) sources or were uninsured (27 million). Approximately 15 million military personnel received coverage through the Veteran's Administration. During the year 2016, 91.2% of Americans had health insurance coverage. An estimated 27 million people under the age of 65 were uninsured.

=== Price transparency issues ===
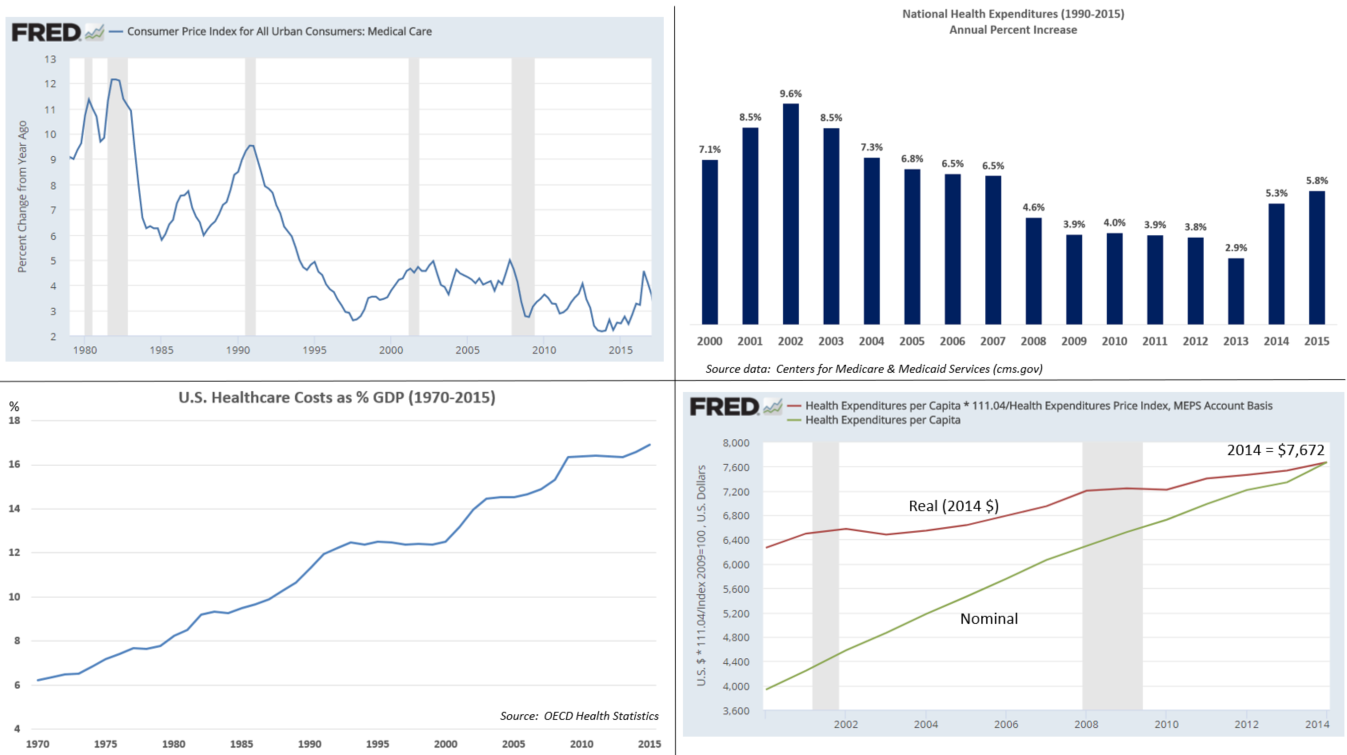
U.S. healthcare cost information, including rate of change, per-capita, and percent of GDP

Unlike most markets for consumer services in the United States, the healthcare market generally lacks transparent market-based pricing. Patients are typically not able to comparison shop for medical services based on price, as medical service providers do not typically disclose prices prior to service. Government mandated critical care and government insurance programs like Medicare also impact the market pricing of U.S. health care. According to The New York Times in 2011, "the United States is far and away the world leader in medical spending, even though numerous studies have concluded that Americans do not get better care" and prices are the highest in the world.

In the U.S. medical industry, patients generally do not have access to pricing information until after medical services have been rendered. A study conducted by the California Healthcare Foundation found that only 25% of visitors asking for pricing information were able to obtain it in a single visit to a hospital. This has led to a phenomenon known as "surprise medical bills", where patients receive large bills for service long after the service was rendered.

Since the majority (85%) of Americans have health insurance, they do not directly pay for medical services. Insurance companies, as payors, negotiate health care pricing with providers on behalf of the insured. Hospitals, doctors, and other medical providers have traditionally disclosed their fee schedules only to insurance companies and other institutional payors, and not to individual patients. Uninsured individuals are expected to pay directly for services, but since they lack access to pricing information, price-based competition may be reduced. The introduction of high-deductible insurance has increased demand for pricing information among consumers. As high-deductible health plans rise across the country, with many individuals having deductibles of $2500 or more, their ability to pay for costly procedures diminishes, and hospitals end up covering the cost of patients care. Many health systems are putting in place price transparency initiatives and payments plans for their patients so that the patients better understand what the estimated cost of their care is, and how they can afford to pay for their care over time.

Organizations such as the American Medical Association (AMA) and AARP support a "fair and accurate valuation for all physician services". Very few resources exist, however, that allow consumers to compare physician prices. The AMA sponsors the Specialty Society Relative Value Scale Update Committee, a private group of physicians which largely determine how to value physician labor in Medicare prices. Among politicians, former House Speaker Newt Gingrich has called for transparency in the prices of medical devices, noting it is one of the few aspects or U.S. health care where consumers and federal health officials are "barred from comparing the quality, medical outcomes or price".

Recently, some insurance companies have announced their intention to begin disclosing provider pricing as a way to encourage cost reduction. Other services exist to assist physicians and their patients, such as Healthcare Out Of Pocket, Accuro Healthcare Solutions, with its CarePricer software. Similarly, medical tourists take advantage of price transparency on websites such as MEDIGO and Purchasing Health, which offer hospital price comparison and appointment booking services.

According to the estimation of the US government, hundreds of thousands of Americans (Californians ) traveled to Mexico annually to get healthcare services.

=== Government-mandated critical care ===
In the United States and most other industrialized nations, emergency medical providers are required to treat any patient that has a life-threatening condition, irrespective of the patient's financial resources. In the U.S., the Emergency Medical Treatment and Active Labor Act requires that hospitals treat all patients in need of emergency medical care without considering patients' ability to pay for service.

This government mandated care places a cost burden on medical providers, as critically ill patients lacking financial resources must be treated. Medical providers compensate for this cost by passing costs on to other parts of the medical system by increasing prices for other patients and through collection of government subsidies.

=== Healthcare is not a typical market ===
Harvard economist N. Gregory Mankiw explained in July 2017 that "the magic of the free market sometimes fails us when it comes to healthcare." This is due to:

- Important positive externalities or situations where the actions of one person or company positively impact the health of others, such as vaccinations and medical research. The free market will result in too little of both (i.e., the benefit is under-estimated by individuals), so government intervention such as subsidies is required to optimize the market outcome.
- Consumers don't know what to buy, as the technical nature of the product requires expert physician advice. The inability to monitor product quality leads to regulation (e.g., licensing of medical professionals and the safety of pharmaceutical products).
- Healthcare spending is unpredictable and expensive. This results in insurance to pool risks and reduce uncertainty. However, this creates a side-effect, the decreased visibility of spending and a tendency to over-consume medical care.
- Adverse selection, where insurers can choose to avoid sick patients. This can lead to a "death spiral" in which the healthiest people drop out of insurance coverage perceiving it too expensive, leading to higher prices for the remainder, repeating the cycle. The Heritage Foundation, a conservative think tank in Washington, D.C., advocated individual mandates in the late 1980s to overcome adverse selection by requiring all persons to obtain insurance or pay penalties, an idea ultimately included in the Affordable Care Act.

== Medicare and Medicaid ==
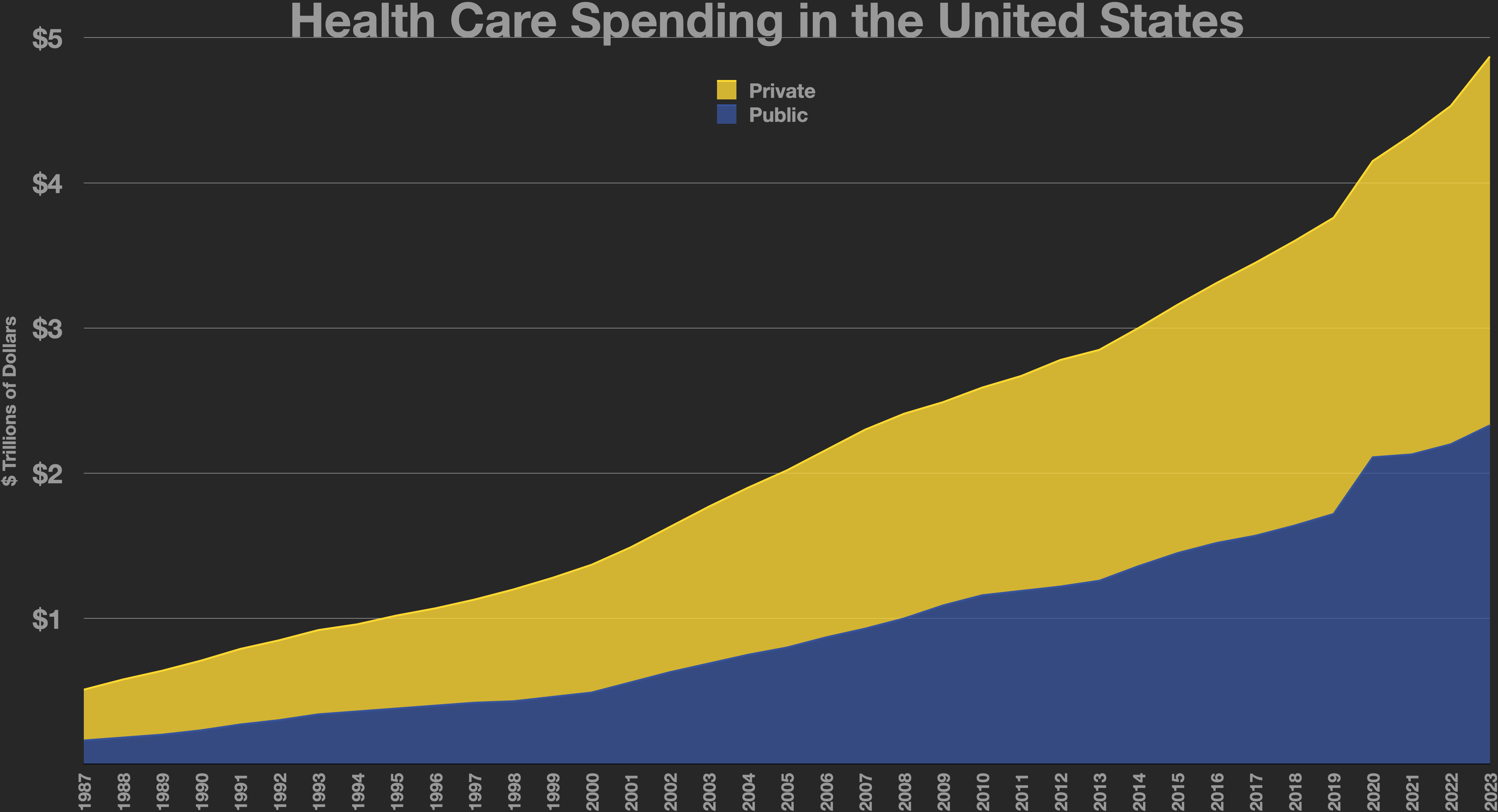
Health care spending in the United States by private and public payers

Medicare was established in 1965 under President Lyndon Johnson, as a form of medical insurance for the elderly (age 65 and above) and the disabled. Medicaid was established at the same time to provide medical insurance primarily to children, pregnant women, and certain other medically needy groups.

The Congressional Budget Office (CBO) reported in October 2017 that adjusted for timing differences, Medicare spending rose by $22 billion (4%) in fiscal year 2017, reflecting growth in both the number of beneficiaries and in the average benefit payment. Medicaid spending rose by $7 billion (2%) in part because of more persons enrolled due to the Affordable Care Act. Unadjusted for timing shifts, in 2017 Medicare spending was $595 billion and Medicaid spending was $375 billion. Medicare covered 57 million people as of September 2016. While on the other hand, Medicaid covered 68.4 million people as of July 2017, 74.3 million including the Children's Health Insurance Program (CHIP).

Medicare and Medicaid are managed at the Federal level by the Centers for Medicare and Medicaid Services (CMS). CMS sets fee schedules for medical services through Prospective Payment Systems (PPS) for inpatient care, outpatient care, and other services. As the largest single purchaser of medical services in the U.S., Medicare's fixed pricing schedules have a significant impact on the market. These prices are set based on CMS' analysis of labor and resource input costs for different medical services based on recommendations by the American Medical Association.

As part of Medicare's pricing system, relative value units (RVUs) are assigned to every medical procedure. One RVU translates into a dollar value that varies by region and by year; in 2005 the base (not location adjusted) RVU equaled roughly $37.90. Major insurers use Medicare's RVU calculations when negotiating payment schedules with providers, and many insurers simply adopt Medicare's payment schedule. The AMA-sponsored committee in charge of determining RVUs of medical procedures that inform Medicare's payment to physicians has been shown to grossly inflate their figures.

== Employer-based market ==
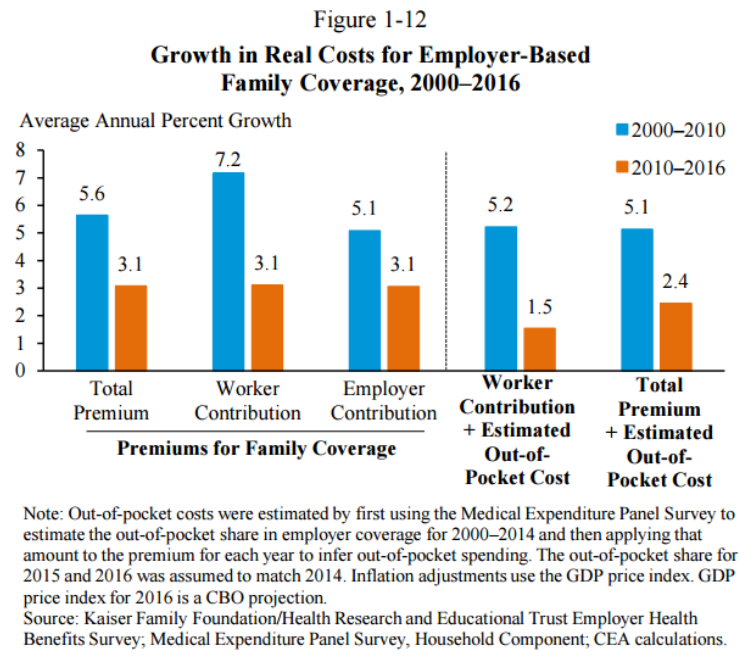
The rate of increase in both health insurance premiums and out-of-pocket costs have declined in the employer-based market. For example, premiums increased at an annual rate of 5.6% from 2000-2010, but 3.1% from 2010-2016.

An estimated 155 million persons under the age 65 were covered under health insurance plans provided by their employers in 2016. The Congressional Budget Office (CBO) estimated that the health insurance premium for single coverage would be $6,400 and family coverage would be $15,500 in 2016. The annual rate of increase in premiums has generally slowed after 2000, as part of the trend of lower annual healthcare cost increases. The Federal Government subsidizes the employer-based market by an estimated $250 billion per year (about $1,612 per person covered in the employer market), by excluding health insurance premiums from employee income. This subsidy encourages people to buy more extensive coverage (which places upward pressure on average premiums), while also encouraging more young, healthy people to enroll (which places downward pressure on premium prices). CBO estimates the net effect is to increase premiums 10-15% over an un-subsidized level.

The Kaiser Family Foundation estimated that family insurance premiums averaged $18,142 in 2016, up 3% from 2015, with workers paying $5,277 towards that cost and employers covering the remainder. Single coverage premiums were essentially unchanged from 2015 to 2016 at $6,435, with workers contributing $1,129 and employers covering the remainder.

The President's Council of Economic Advisors (CEA) described how annual cost increases have fallen in the employer market since 2000. Premiums for family coverage grew 5.6% from 2000-2010, but 3.1% from 2010-2016. The total premium plus estimated out-of-pocket costs (i.e., deductibles and co-payments) increased 5.1% from 2000-2010 but 2.4% from 2010-2016.

== Affordable Care Act (ACA) marketplaces ==
Separate from the employer market are the ACA marketplaces, which covered an estimated 12 million persons in 2017 who individually obtain insurance (e.g., not as part of a business). The law is designed to pay subsidies in the form of premium tax credits to the individuals or families purchasing the insurance, based on income levels. Higher income consumers receive lower subsidies. While pre-subsidy prices rose considerably from 2016 to 2017, so did the subsidies, to reduce the after-subsidy cost to the consumer.

For example, a study published in 2016 found that the average requested 2017 premium increase among 40-year-old non-smokers was about 9 percent, according to an analysis of 17 cities, although Blue Cross Blue Shield proposed increases of 40 percent in Alabama and 60 percent in Texas. However, some or all of these costs are offset by subsidies, paid as tax credits. For example, the Kaiser Foundation reported that for the second-lowest cost "Silver plan" (a plan often selected and used as the benchmark for determining financial assistance), a 40-year old non-smoker making $30,000 per year would pay effectively the same amount in 2017 as they did in 2016 (about $208/month) after the subsidy/tax credit, despite large increases in the pre-subsidy price. This was consistent nationally. In other words, the subsidies increased along with the pre-subsidy price, fully offsetting the price increases.

This premium tax credit subsidy is separate from the cost sharing reductions subsidy discontinued in 2017 by President Donald Trump, an action which raised premiums in the ACA marketplaces by an estimated 20 percentage points above what otherwise would have occurred, for the 2018 plan year.

== Deductibles ==
While health insurance premium cost increases have moderated in the employer market, some of this is because of insurance policies that have a higher deductible, co-payments and out-of-pocket maximums that shift costs from insurers to patients. In addition, many employees are choosing to combine a health savings account with higher deductible plans, making the impact of the ACA difficult to determine precisely.

For those who obtain their insurance through their employer ("group market"), a 2016 survey found that:

- Deductibles grew by 63% from 2011 to 2016, while premiums increased 19% and worker earnings grew by 11%.
- In 2016, 4 in 5 workers had an insurance deductible, which averaged $1,478. For firms with less than 200 employees, the deductible averaged $2,069.
- The percentage of workers with a deductible of at least $1,000 grew from 10% in 2006 to 51% in 2016. The 2016 figure drops to 38% after taking employer contributions into account.

For the "non-group" market, of which two-thirds are covered by the ACA exchanges, a survey of 2015 data found that:

- 49% had individual deductibles of at least $1,500 ($3,000 for family), up from 36% in 2014.
- Many marketplace enrollees qualify for cost-sharing subsidies that reduce their net deductible.
- While about 75% of enrollees were "very satisfied" or "somewhat satisfied" with their choice of doctors and hospitals, only 50% had such satisfaction with their annual deductible.
- While 52% of those covered by the ACA exchanges felt "well protected" by their insurance, in the group market 63% felt that way.

== Prescription drugs ==
According to the OECD, U.S. prescription drug spending in 2015 was $1,162 per person on average, versus $807 for Canada, $766 for Germany, $668 for France, and is capped in the UK at £105.90($132)

== Reasons for higher costs ==
The reasons for higher U.S. healthcare costs relative to other countries and over time are debated by experts.

=== Relative to other countries ===
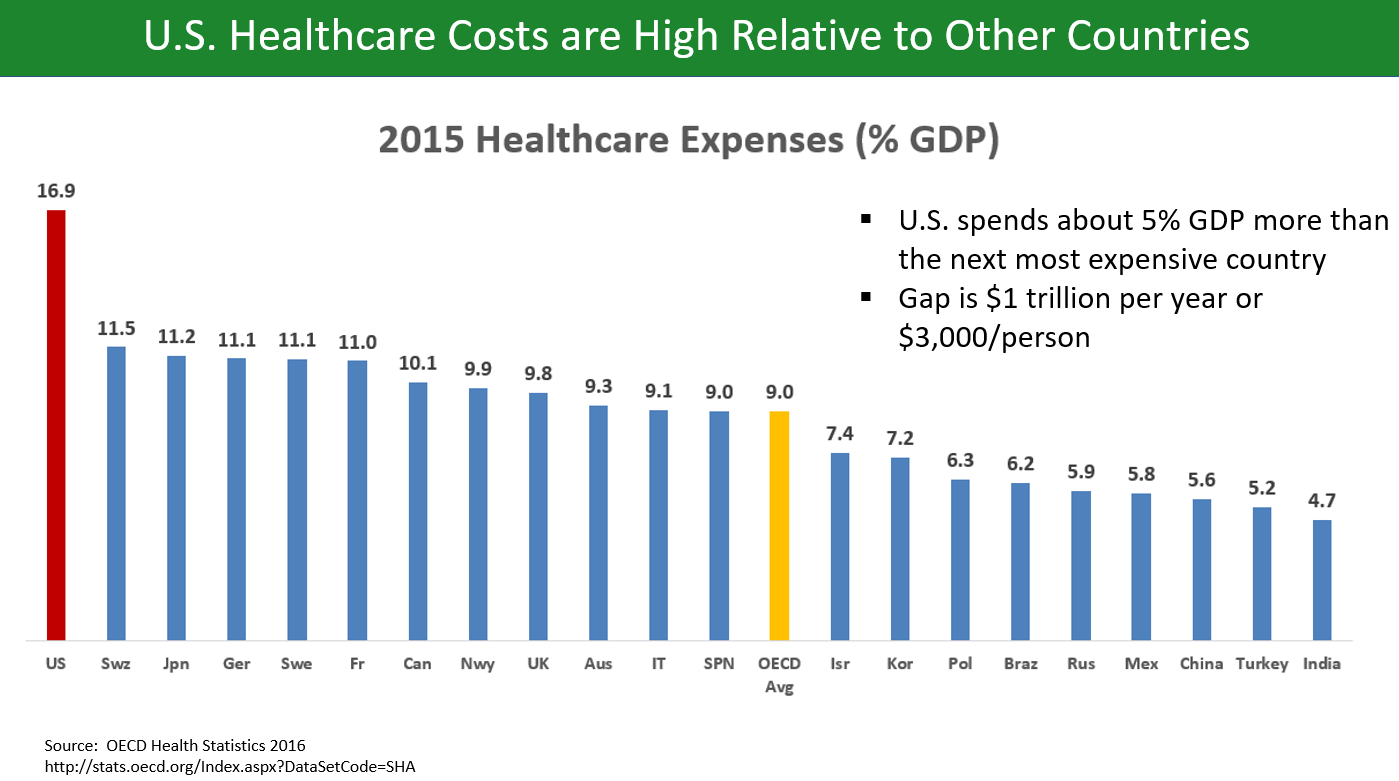
Comparing healthcare costs as percentage of GDP across OECD countries

Though the U.S. healthcare system tends to produce more innovation, it has a lower level of regulation, and almost every form of its healthcare costs more than other high-income countries.

U.S. healthcare costs in 2015 were 16.9% GDP according to the OECD, over 5% GDP higher than the next most expensive OECD country. With U.S. GDP of $19 trillion, healthcare costs were about $3.2 trillion, or about $10,000 per person in a country of 320 million people. A gap of 5% GDP represents $1 trillion, about $3,000 per person relative to the next most expensive country. In other words, the U.S. would have to cut healthcare costs by roughly one-third ($1 trillion or $3,000 per person on average) to be competitive with the next most expensive country. Healthcare spending in the U.S. was distributed as follows in 2014: Hospital care 32%; physician and clinical services 20%; prescription drugs 10%; and all other, including many categories individually making up less than 5% of spending. These first three categories accounted for 62% of spending.

Important differences include:

- Administrative costs. About 25% of U.S. healthcare costs relate to administrative costs (e.g., billing and payment, as opposed to direct provision of services, supplies and medicine) versus 10-15% in other countries. For example, Duke University Hospital had 900 hospital beds but 1,300 billing clerks. Assuming $3.2 trillion is spent on healthcare per year, a 10% savings would be $320 billion per year and a 15% savings would be nearly $500 billion per year. For scale, cutting administrative costs to peer country levels would represent roughly one-third to half the gap. A 2009 study from Price Waterhouse Coopers estimated $210 billion in savings from unnecessary billing and administrative costs, a figure that would be considerably higher in 2015 dollars.
- Cost variation across hospital regions. Harvard economist David Cutler reported in 2013 that roughly 33% of healthcare spending, or about $1 trillion per year, is not associated with improved outcomes. Medicare reimbursements per enrollee vary significantly across the country. In 2012, average Medicare reimbursements per enrollee ranged from an adjusted (for health status, income, and ethnicity) $6,724 in the lowest spending region to $13,596 in the highest.
- The U.S. spends more than other countries for the same things. Drugs are more expensive, doctors are paid more, and suppliers charge more for medical equipment than other countries. Journalist Todd Hixon reported on a study that U.S. spending on physicians per person is about five times higher than peer countries, $1,600 versus $310, as much as 37% of the gap with other countries. This was driven by a greater use of specialist doctors, who charge 3-6 times more in the U.S. than in peer countries.
- Higher level of per-capita income, which is correlated with higher healthcare spending in the U.S. and other countries. Hixon reported a study by Princeton Professor Uwe Reinhardt that concluded about $1,200 per person (in 2008 dollars) or about a third of the gap with peer countries in healthcare spending was due to higher levels of per-capita income. Higher income per-capita is correlated with using more units of healthcare.
- Americans receive more medical care than people in other countries. The U.S. consumes 3 times as many mammograms, 2.5x the number of MRI scans, and 31% more C-sections per-capita than peer countries. This is a blend of higher per-capita income and higher use of specialists, among other factors.
- The U.S. government intervenes less actively to force down prices in the United States than in other countries. Stanford economist Victor Fuchs wrote in 2014: "If we turn the question around and ask why healthcare costs so much less in other high-income countries, the answer nearly always points to a larger, stronger role for government. Governments usually eliminate much of the high administrative costs of insurance, obtain lower prices for inputs, and influence the mix of healthcare outputs by arranging for large supplies of primary-care physicians and hospital beds while keeping tight control on the number of specialist physicians and expensive technology. In the United States, the political system creates many “choke points” for diverse interest groups to block or modify government’s role in these areas."

=== Relative to prior years ===
The Congressional Budget Office analyzed the reasons for healthcare cost inflation over time, reporting in 2008 that: "Although many factors contributed to the growth, most analysts have concluded that the bulk of the long-term rise resulted from the health care system's use of new medical services that were made possible by technological advances..." In summarizing several studies, CBO reported the following drove the indicated share (shown as a range across three studies) of the increase from 1940 to 1990:

- Technology changes: 38-65%. CBO defined this as "any changes in clinical practice that enhance the ability of providers to diagnose, treat, or prevent health problems."
- Personal income growth: 5-23%. Persons with more income tend to spend a greater share of it on healthcare.
- Administrative costs: 3-13%.
- Aging of the population: 2%. As the country ages, more persons require more expensive treatments, as the aged tend to be sicker.

According to Federal Reserve data, healthcare annual inflation rates have declined in recent decades:

- 1970–1979: 7.8%
- 1980–1989: 8.3%
- 1990–1999: 5.3%
- 2000–2009: 4.1%
- 2010–2016: 3.0%

While this inflation rate has declined, it has generally remained above the rate of economic growth, resulting in a steady increase of health expenditures relative to GDP from 6% in 1970 to nearly 18% in 2015.

== See also ==
- American Health Care Act of 2017
- Charge description master
- Financial toxicity
- Health care finance in the United States
- Health system
- Healthcare rationing in the United States
- Healthcare reform debate in the United States
- Medical debt in the United States
- Medical debt
