= Relative value =

Relative value may refer to:

- Chess piece relative value
- Relative value (economics)
- Relative value (philosophy)
- Relative Value Units in healthcare systems
