= Health care finance in the United States =

Annual healthcare expenditure per capita in the USA versus other countries

Health care finance in the United States discusses how Americans obtain and pay for their healthcare, and why U.S. healthcare costs are the highest in the world based on various measures.

It is possible to negotiate the price of the medical bills with the hospital billing department.

== Overview ==
Though the U.S. healthcare system tends to produce more innovation, it has a lower level of regulation, and almost every form of its healthcare costs more than other high-income countries.

The American system is a mix of public and private insurance. The government provides insurance coverage for approximately 53 million elderly via Medicare, 62 million lower-income persons via Medicaid, and 15 million military veterans via the Veteran's Administration. About 178 million employed by companies receive subsidized health insurance through their employer, while 52 million other people directly purchase insurance either via the subsidized marketplace exchanges developed as part of the Affordable Care Act or directly from insurers. The private sector delivers healthcare services, with the exception of the Veteran's Administration, where doctors are employed by the government.

The Centers for Medicare and Medicaid (CMS) reported that U.S. health care costs rose 5.8% to reach $3.2 trillion in 2015, or $9,990 per person. As measured by CMS, the share of the U.S. economy devoted to health care spending was 17.8% GDP in 2015, up from 17.4% in 2014. Increases were driven by the coverage expansion that began in 2014 as a result of the Affordable Care Act (i.e., more persons demanding healthcare or more healthcare units consumed) as well as higher healthcare prices per unit.

U.S. healthcare costs are considerably higher than other countries as a share of GDP, among other measures. According to the OECD, U.S. healthcare costs in 2015 were 16.9% GDP, over 5% GDP higher than the next most expensive OECD country. A gap of 5% GDP represents $1 trillion, about $3,000 per person relative to the next most expensive country. In other words, the U.S. would have to cut healthcare costs by roughly one-third to be competitive with the next most expensive country.

Reasons for higher costs than other countries including higher administrative costs, spending more for the same services (i.e., higher prices per unit), receiving more medical care (units) per capita than other countries, cost variation across hospital regions without different results, higher levels of per-capita income, and less active government intervention to reduce costs. Spending is highly concentrated among sicker patients. The Institute of Medicine reported in September 2012 that approximately $750B per year in U.S. health care costs are avoidable or wasted. This included: unnecessary services ($210 billion annually); inefficient delivery of care ($130 billion); excess administrative costs ($190 billion); inflated prices ($105 billion); prevention failures ($55 billion), and fraud ($75 billion).

Despite this spending, the quality of health care overall is low by OECD measures. The Commonwealth Fund ranked the United States last in the quality of health care among similar countries.

The percentage of persons without health insurance (the "uninsured") fell from 13.3% in 2013 to 8.8% in 2016, due primarily to the Affordable Care Act. The number uninsured fell from 41.8 million in 2013 to 28.0 million in 2016, a decline of 13.8 million. The number of persons with insurance (public or private) rose from 271.6 million in 2013 to 292.3 million in 2016, an increase of 20.7 million. In 2016, approximately 68% were covered by private plans, while 37% were covered by government plans; these do not add to 100% because some persons have both.

Among those whose employer pays for health insurance, the employee may be required to contribute part of the cost of this insurance, while the employer usually chooses the insurance company and, for large groups, negotiates with the insurance company. The government subsidizes the employer-based insurance by excluding premiums paid by employers from the employees income. This subsidy tax expenditure reduced federal tax revenue by $248 billion in 2013, or 1.5% GDP.

The non-partisan Congressional Budget Office (CBO) reported in March 2017 that healthcare cost inflation and an aging population are primary drivers of increasing budget deficits over time, as outlays (spending) continue to rise faster than revenues relative to GDP. CBO forecast that spending on major healthcare programs (including Medicare and Medicaid) would rise from 5.5% GDP in 2017 to 9.2% GDP by 2047.

== Spending ==
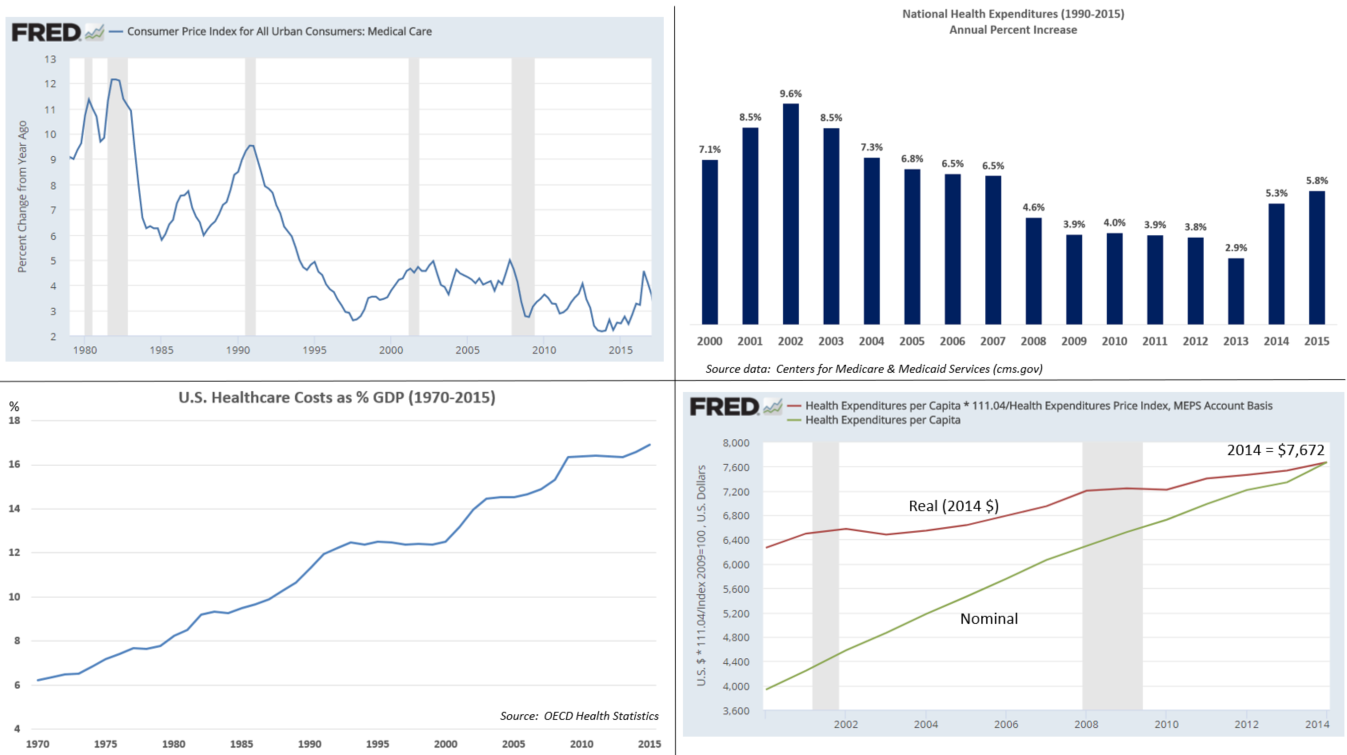
U.S. healthcare cost information, including rate of change, per-capita, and percent of GDP

=== As percentage of GDP ===
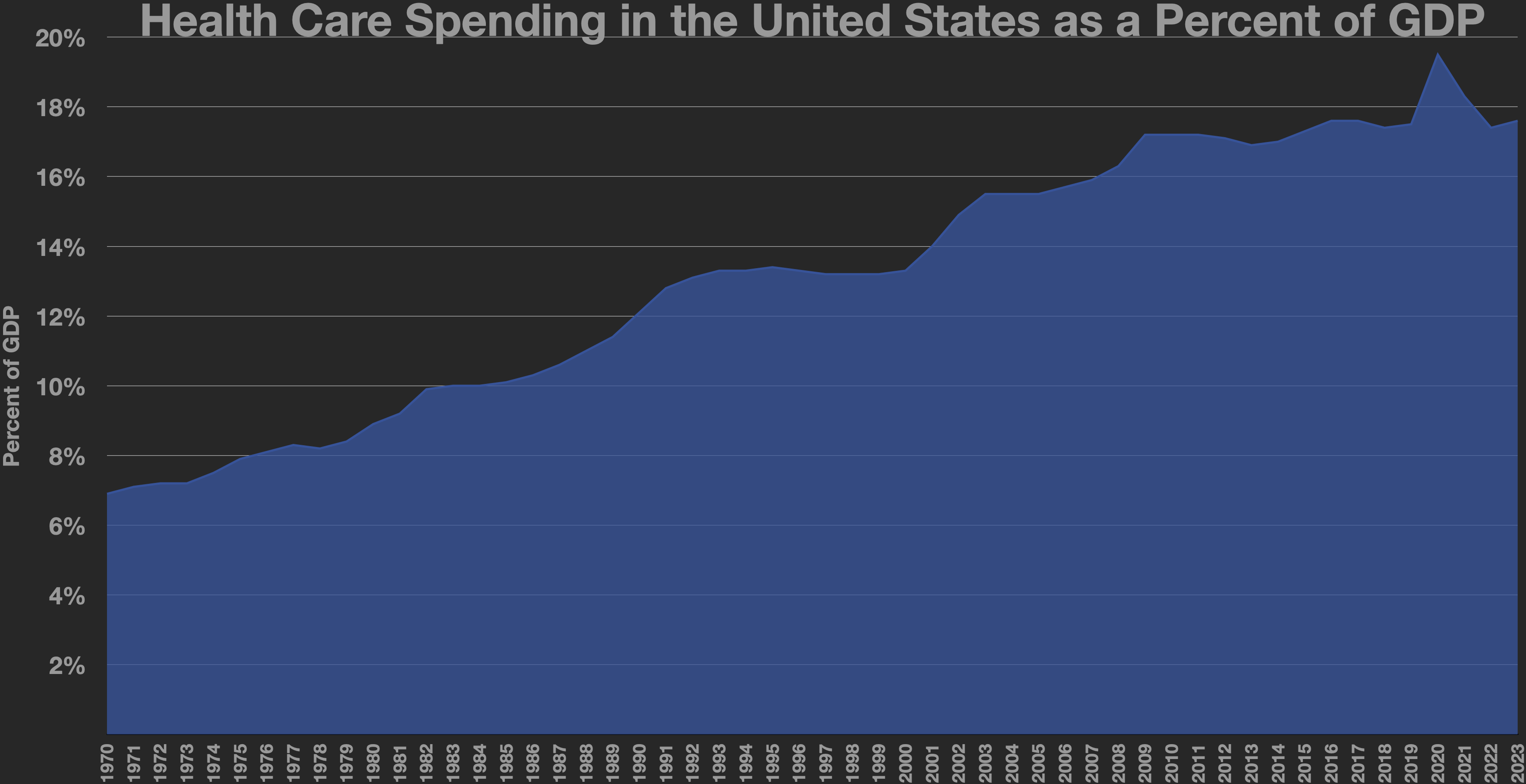
Health care spending as a percent of GDP in the United States

The Centers for Medicare and Medicaid (CMS) reported that U.S. health care costs rose to 17.8% GDP in 2015, up from 17.4% in 2014. Increases were driven by the coverage expansion that began in 2014 as a result of the Affordable Care Act (i.e., more persons demanding healthcare or more healthcare units consumed) as well as higher healthcare prices per unit.

U.S. healthcare costs are considerably higher than other countries as a share of GDP, among other measures. According to the OECD, U.S. healthcare costs in 2015 were 16.9% GDP, over 5% GDP higher than the next most expensive OECD country. A gap of 5% GDP represents $1 trillion, about $3,000 per person relative to the next most expensive country. In other words, the U.S. would have to cut healthcare costs by roughly one-third ($1 trillion or $3,000 per person on average) to be competitive with the next most expensive country.

=== Per capita ===
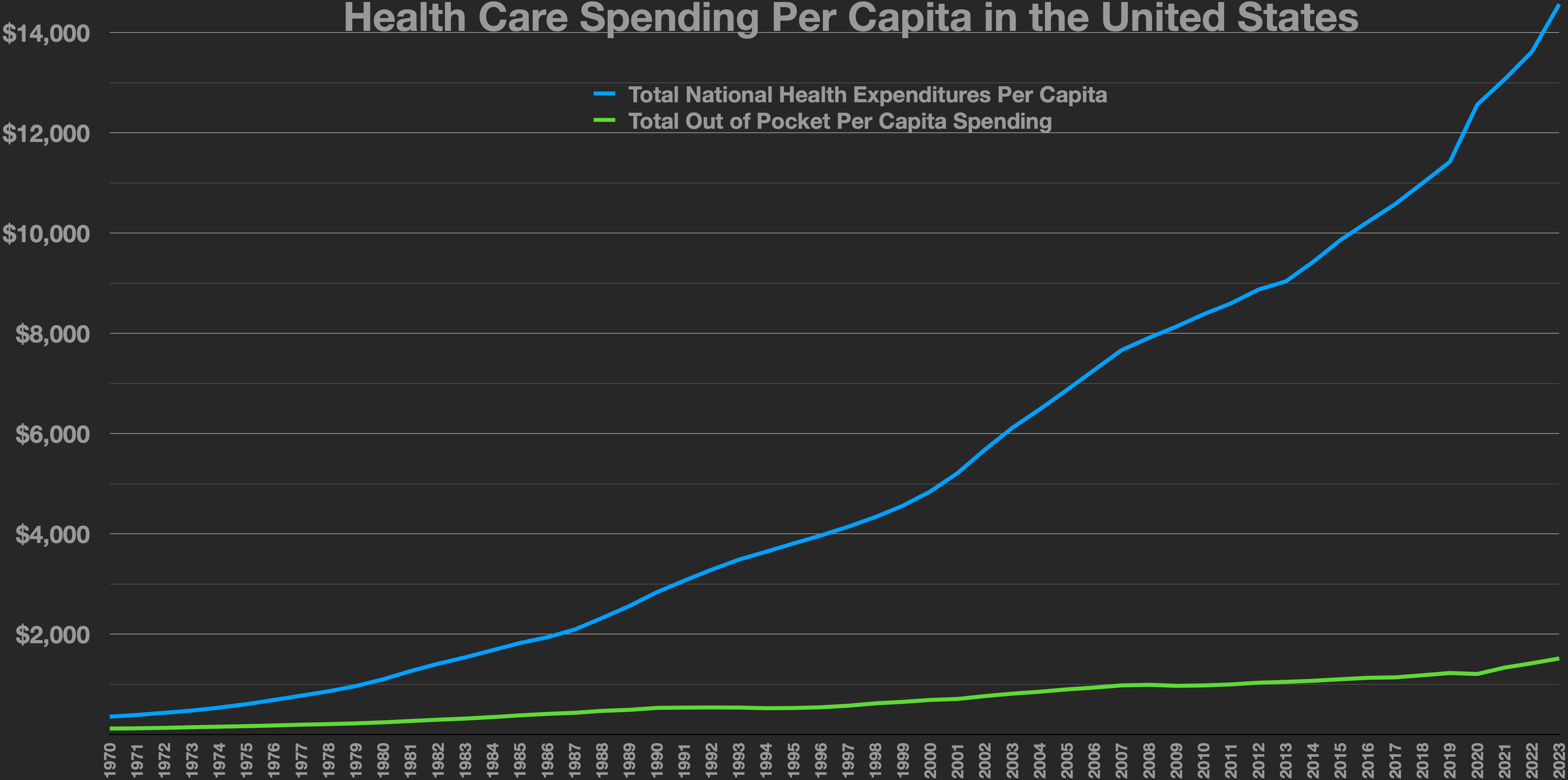
Health care spending per capita

The Centers for Medicare and Medicaid (CMS) reported that U.S. health care costs rose 5.8% to reach $3.2 trillion in 2015, or $9,990 per person.

The Office of the Actuary (OACT) of the Centers for Medicare and Medicaid Services publishes data on total health care spending in the United States, including both historical levels and future projections. In 2007, the U.S. spent $2.26 trillion on healthcare, or $7,439 per person, up from $2.1 trillion, or $7,026 per capita, the previous year. Spending in 2006 represented 16% of GDP, an increase of 6.7% over 2004 spending. Growth in spending is projected to average 6.7% annually over the period 2007 through 2017.

In 2009, the United States federal, state and local governments, corporations and individuals, together spent $2.5 trillion, $8,047 per person, on health care. This amount represented 17.3% of the GDP, up from 16.2% in 2008. Health insurance costs are rising faster than wages or inflation, and medical causes were cited by about half of bankruptcy filers in the United States in 2001.

=== Rate of increase ===
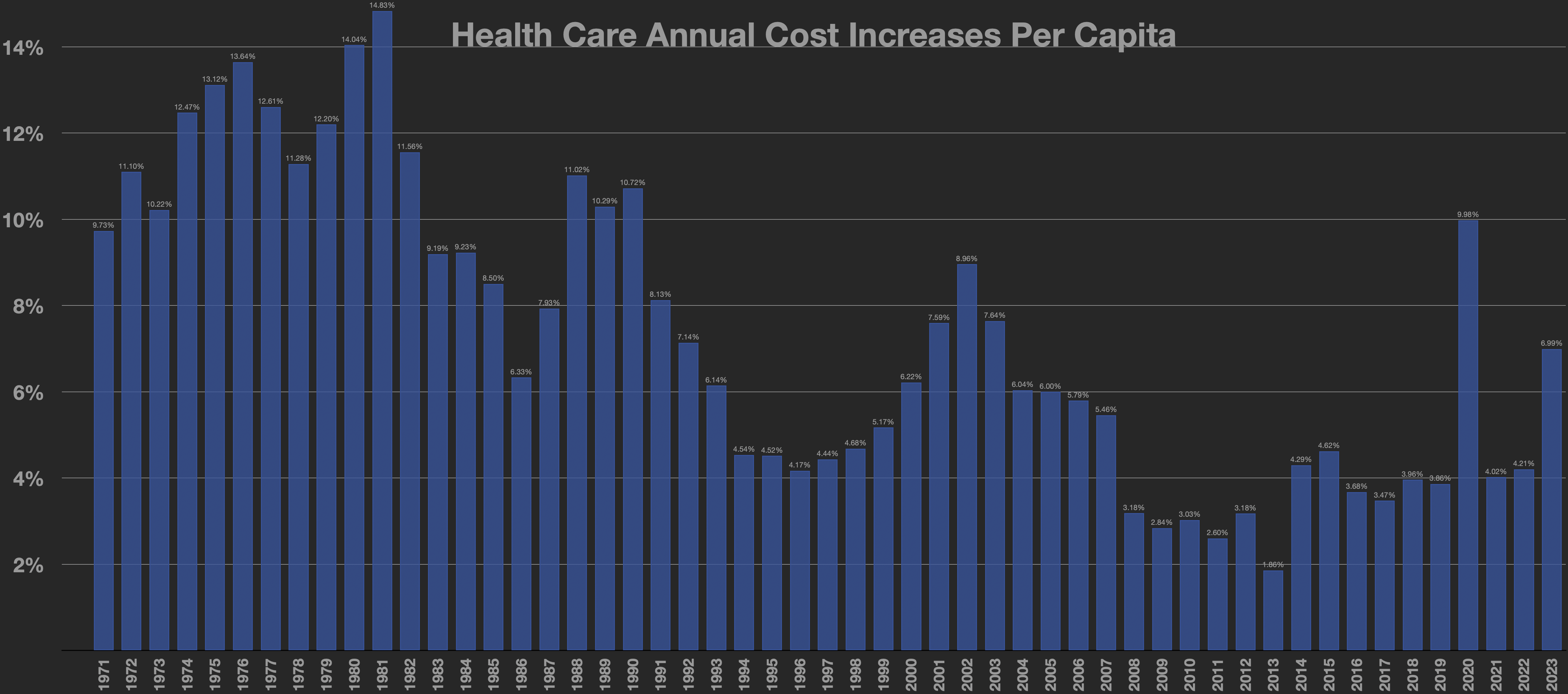
Health care annual cost increases per capita

The Centers for Medicare and Medicaid Services reported in 2013 that the rate of increase in annual healthcare costs has fallen since 2002. However, costs relative to GDP and per capita continue to rise. Per capita cost increases have averaged 5.4% since 2000.

According to Federal Reserve data, healthcare annual inflation rates have declined in recent decades:

- 1970-1979: 7.8%
- 1980-1989: 8.3%
- 1990-1999: 5.3%
- 2000-2009: 4.1%
- 2010-2016: 3.0%

While this inflation rate has declined, it has generally remained above the rate of economic growth, resulting in a steady increase of health expenditures relative to GDP from 6% in 1970 to nearly 18% in 2015.

Health care cost rise in the U.S. relative to other countries, as measured by total expenditure on health as percent of GDP

=== Relative to other countries ===
U.S. healthcare costs in 2015 were 16.9% GDP according to the OECD, over 5% GDP higher than the next most expensive OECD country. With U.S. GDP of $19 trillion, healthcare costs were about $3.2 trillion, or about $10,000 per person in a country of 320 million people. A gap of 5% GDP represents $1 trillion, about $3,000 per person relative to the next most expensive country. In other words, the U.S. would have to cut healthcare costs by roughly one-third to be competitive with the next most expensive country.

One analysis of international spending levels in the year 2000 found that while the U.S. spends more on health care than other countries in the Organisation for Economic Co-operation and Development (OECD), the use of health care services in the U.S. is below the OECD median by most measures. The authors of the study concluded that the prices paid for health care services are much higher in the U.S.

According to Financial Times United States spent more than $600 billion on medicines in 2022, nearly half of the world's total.

=== Concentration ===
Spending is highly concentrated among a relatively few patients. The Kaiser Family Foundation reported that the concentration of health care spending in the U.S. in 2010 was as follows:

- The top 1% of persons accounted for 21% of health care spending;
- The top 5% accounted for 50%;
- The top 20% accounted for 82%; and
- The bottom 50% of persons accounted for only 3% of spending.

Other studies have found similar results using AHRQ analysis. Relative to the overall population, those who remained in the top 10% of spenders between 2008 and 2009 were more likely to be in fair or poor health, elderly, female, non-Hispanic whites and those with public-only coverage. Those who remained in the bottom half of spenders were more likely to be in excellent health, children and young adults, men, Hispanics, and the uninsured. These patterns were stable through the 1970s and 1980s, and some data suggest that they may have been typical of the early-to-mid 20th century as well.

An earlier study by AHRQ found that a significant persistence in the level of health care spending from year to year. Of the 1% of the population with the highest health care spending in 2002, 24.3% maintained their ranking in the top 1% in 2003. Of the 5% with the highest spending in 2002, 34% maintained that ranking in 2003. Individuals over age 45 were disproportionately represented among those who were in the top decile of spending for both years.

Seniors spend, on average, far more on health care costs than either working-age adults or children. The pattern of spending by age was stable for most ages from 1987 through 2004, with the exception of spending for seniors age 85 and over. Spending for this group grew less rapidly than that of other groups over this period.

The 2008 edition of the Dartmouth Atlas of Health Care found that providing Medicare beneficiaries with severe chronic illnesses with more intense health care in the last two years of life—increased spending, more tests, more procedures and longer hospital stays—is not associated with better patient outcomes. There are significant geographic variations in the level of care provided to chronically ill patients, only 4% of which are explained by differences in the number of severely ill people in an area. Most of the differences are explained by differences in the amount of "supply-sensitive" care available in an area. Acute hospital care accounts for over half (55%) of the spending for Medicare beneficiaries in the last two years of life, and differences in the volume of services provided is more significant than differences in price. The researchers found no evidence of "substitution" of care, where increased use of hospital care would reduce outpatient spending (or vice versa).

=== Distribution of spending by service type ===
Healthcare spending in the U.S. was distributed as follows by type of service in 2014: Hospital care 32%; physician and clinical services 20%; prescription drugs 10%; and all other, including many categories individually making up less than 7% of spending. These first three categories accounted for 62% of spending.

This distribution is relatively stable; in 2008, 31% went to hospital care, 21% to physician/clinical services, 10% to pharmaceuticals, 4% to dental, 6% to nursing homes, 3% to home health care, 3% for other retail products, 3% for government public health activities, 7% to administrative costs, 7% to investment, and 6% to other professional services (physical therapists, optometrists, etc.).

=== Hospitalization costs ===
According to a report from the Agency for Healthcare Research and Quality (AHRQ), aggregate U.S. hospital costs in 2011 were $387.3 billion—a 63% increase since 1997 (inflation adjusted). Costs per stay increased 47% since 1997, averaging $10,000 in 2011.

== Insurance markets ==
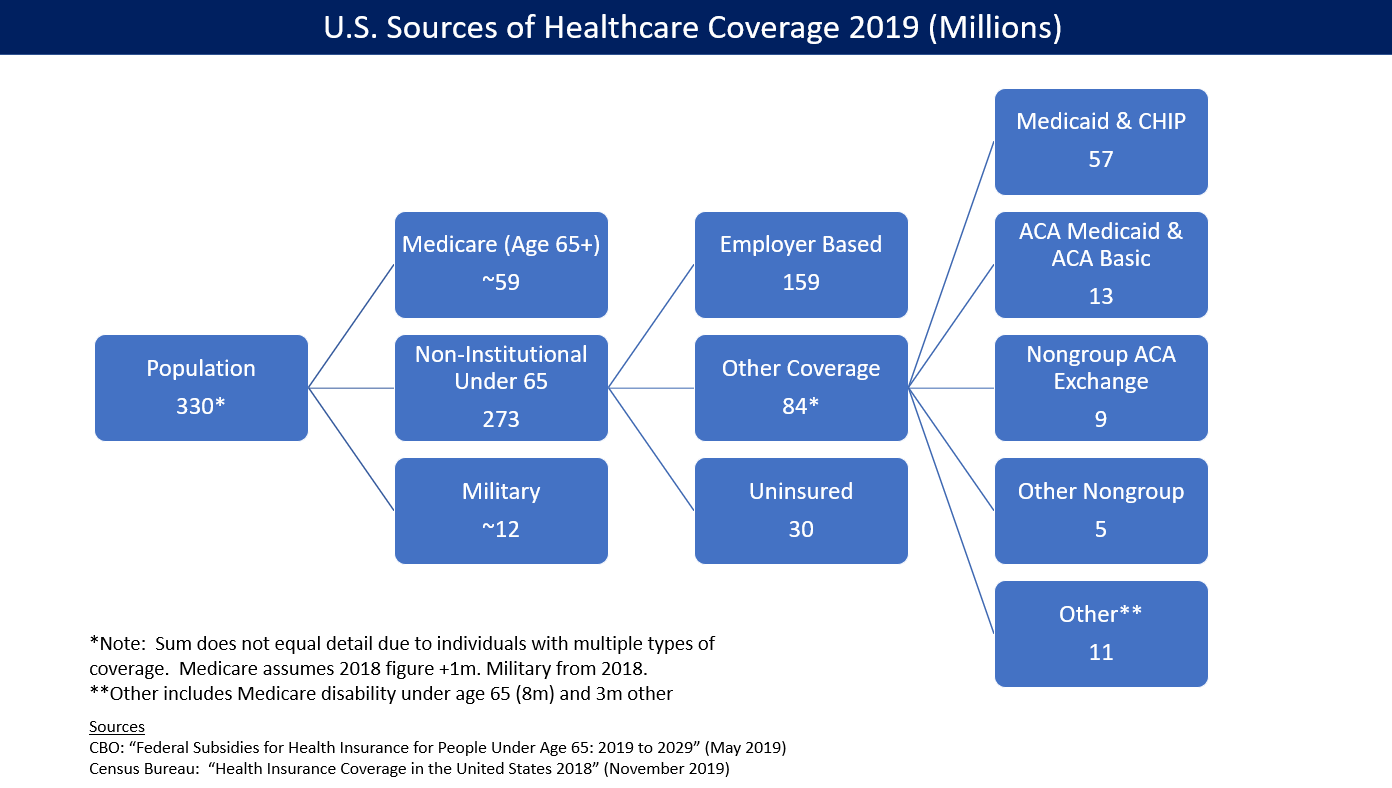
U.S. health insurance coverage by source in 2016. CBO estimated ACA/Obamacare was responsible for 23 million persons covered via exchanges and Medicaid expansion.

=== Employee market ===
An estimated 178 million persons under 65 obtain their insurance through their employer. Firms are often "self-insured", meaning they reimburse the insurance companies that pay the medical claims on behalf of their employees. Employers may use a stop-loss, meaning they pay the insurance company a premium to cover very expensive individual claims (e.g., the firm is self-insured up to a threshold for individual workers). Workers pay a share of their costs to their employers for coverage, basically a premium deducted from their paychecks. Workers also have deductibles and out-of-pocket costs. The structure of the insurance plan may also include a Health savings account or HSA, which enable workers to save money tax-free for health expenses.

The Kaiser Family Foundation reported that employer-based health insurance premiums for a family of four averaged $18,765 in 2017, up 3% from the prior year, although there was considerable variation around this average. For single coverage, the premium costs averaged $6,690, up 4% from the previous year. The typical worker contributed $5,714 on average towards their coverage, with the employer providing the remainder.

Deductibles have been rising much faster than premiums in recent years. For example, deductibles rose 12% in 2016, four times faster than premiums. From 2011 to 2016, deductibles rose 63% for single coverage, versus 19% for single coverage premiums. During that time, worker earnings rose 11%. The average annual deductible is around $1,500. For employers with fewer than 200 employees, 65% of employees are now in "high-deductible plans" which averaged $2,000.

One consequence of employer-based coverage (as opposed to single-payer or government-funded via individual taxes) is that employers facing increasing healthcare costs offset the expense by either paying relatively less or hiring fewer workers. Since health insurance benefits paid by employers are not treated as income to employees, the government foregoes a sizable amount of tax revenue each year. This subsidy or tax expenditure was estimated by CBO at $281 billion in 2017. On March 1, 2010, billionaire investor Warren Buffett said that the high costs paid by U.S. companies for their employees' health care put them at a competitive disadvantage. He compared the roughly 17% of GDP spent by the U.S. on health care with the 9% of GDP spent by much of the rest of the world, noted that the U.S. has fewer doctors and nurses per person, and said, "[t]hat kind of a cost, compared with the rest of the world, is like a tapeworm eating at our economic body."

=== ACA marketplaces ===
An estimated 12 million persons obtained their insurance from insurance companies in 2016 via online marketplaces (federal or state) developed as part of the Affordable Care Act, also known as "Obamacare." This insurance is federally subsidized through a premium tax credit, which varies based on the level of income of the individual. The credit is typically applied by the insurance company to lower the monthly premium payment. The post-subsidy premium cost is capped as a percentage of income, meaning as premiums rise the subsidies rise. Approximately 10 million persons on the exchanges are eligible for subsidies. An estimated 80% of persons obtaining coverage under the ACA can get it for less than $75 per month after subsidies, if they choose the lowest-cost "bronze" plan. The average cost for the "second-lowest cost silver plan" (the benchmark plan and one of the most popular) was $208/month after subsidy for a 40-year-old male non-smoker in 2017.

President Trump's decision in November 2017 to end the cost sharing reductions subsidy, a second type of subsidy used to reduce deductibles and co-payments, was expected to increase premiums dramatically, thereby increasing the premium tax credits as well to maintain after-subsidy costs to participants at the same percentage of income. In other words, the after-subsidy cost would not rise for those with premium tax credit subsidies. Those obtaining their insurance via the exchanges without subsidies would pay up to 20 percentage points more for insurance. CBO also estimated a $200 billion increase in the budget deficit over a decade due to Trump's decision.

The CBO estimated that ending or not enforcing the individual mandate (which requires those without health insurance to pay a penalty) would increase the uninsured by 13 million by 2027, reducing the budget deficit by $338 billion over 10 years as subsidies fall. CBO also estimated that ending the mandate would encourage healthier people to drop out of the marketplaces, thus raising premiums by up to 10%.

=== Medicaid ===
Medicaid is a joint federal and state program that helps with medical costs for about 74 million people (as of 2017) with limited income and resources. Medicaid also offers benefits not normally covered by Medicare, like nursing home care and personal care services. Medicaid is the largest source of funding for medical and health-related services for people with low income in the United States, providing free health insurance to low-income and disabled people. It is a means-tested program that is jointly funded by the state and federal governments and managed by the states, with each state currently having broad leeway to determine who is eligible for its implementation of the program. States are not required to participate in the program, although all have since 1982. Medicaid recipients must be U.S. citizens or legal permanent residents, and may include low-income adults, their children, and people with certain disabilities. Poverty alone does not necessarily qualify someone for Medicaid. The Federal Medical Assistance Percentage (FMAP), the percent of Medicaid program costs covered by the federal government, ranges from 50% for higher-income states to 75% for states with lower per-capita incomes.

The Affordable Care Act ("Obamacare") significantly expanded both eligibility for and federal funding of Medicaid starting in 2014, with an additional 11 million covered by 2016. Under the law as written, all U.S. citizens and legal residents with income up to 133% of the poverty line, including adults without dependent children, would qualify for coverage in any state that participated in the Medicaid program. However, the United States Supreme Court ruled in National Federation of Independent Business v. Sebelius that states do not have to agree to this expansion to continue to receive previously established levels of Medicaid funding, and 19 Republican-controlled states have chosen to continue with pre-ACA funding levels and eligibility standards. Expanding Medicaid in these 19 states would expand coverage for up to four million people.

The CBO reported in October 2017 that the federal government spent $375 billion on Medicaid in fiscal year 2017, an increase of $7 billion or 2% over 2016. The increase was primarily driven by more persons covered due to the ACA.

=== Medicare ===
Medicare covered 57 million people mainly aged 65 and over as of September 2016. Enrollees pay little in premiums but have deductibles for hospital stays. The program is funded partially by the Federal Insurance Contributions Act payroll tax and partially by the general fund (other tax revenues). The CBO reported in October 2017 that adjusted for timing differences, Medicare spending rose by $22 billion (4%) in fiscal year 2017 to $595 billion, reflecting growth in both the number of beneficiaries and in the average benefit payment. Medicare average spending per-enrollee was $10,986 in 2014 across the U.S., with states ranging from $8,238 in Montana to $12,614 in New Jersey.

=== Military ===
The Department of Defense and Veterans Health Administration both operate health systems and insurance systems for military personnel, their families, and retirees and their dependents.

==== Defense Health Agency ====
The Defense Health Agency is a joint, integrated Combat Support Agency founded in 2013 that enables the U.S. Army, U.S. Navy, and U.S. Air Force medical services to provide a medically ready force and ready medical force to Combatant Commands in both peacetime and wartime. The Department of Defense's unified medical program represents $49.5 billion or 8% of total FY2020 U.S. military spending.

==== Tricare ====
Tricare (styled TRICARE) is a health care program of the Department of Defense Military Health System. Tricare provides civilian health benefits for U.S Armed Forces military personnel, military retirees, and their dependents, including some members of the Reserve Component. Tricare is the civilian care component of the Military Health System, although historically it also included health care delivered in military medical treatment facilities. The Department of Defense operates a health care delivery system served approximately 9.6 million beneficiaries in 2020. With the exception of active duty service members (who are assigned to the TRICARE Prime option and pay no out-of-pocket costs for TRICARE coverage), Military Health System beneficiaries may have a choice of TRICARE plan options depending upon their status (e.g., active duty family member, retiree, reservist, child under age 26 ineligible for family coverage, Medicare-eligible, etc.) and geographic location.

==== Veterans Health Administration ====
The Veterans Health Administration is the component of the United States Department of Veterans Affairs that implements the healthcare program of the VA through the administration and operation of numerous VA Medical Centers (VAMC), Outpatient Clinics (OPC), Community Based Outpatient Clinics (CBOC), and VA Community Living Centers (VA Nursing Home) Programs to serve tens of millions of military veterans. It employs over 300,000 personal and has a budget of $65 billion USD (2015)

== Reasons for higher costs ==
The reasons for higher U.S. healthcare costs relative to other countries and over time are debated by experts.

=== Relative to other countries ===
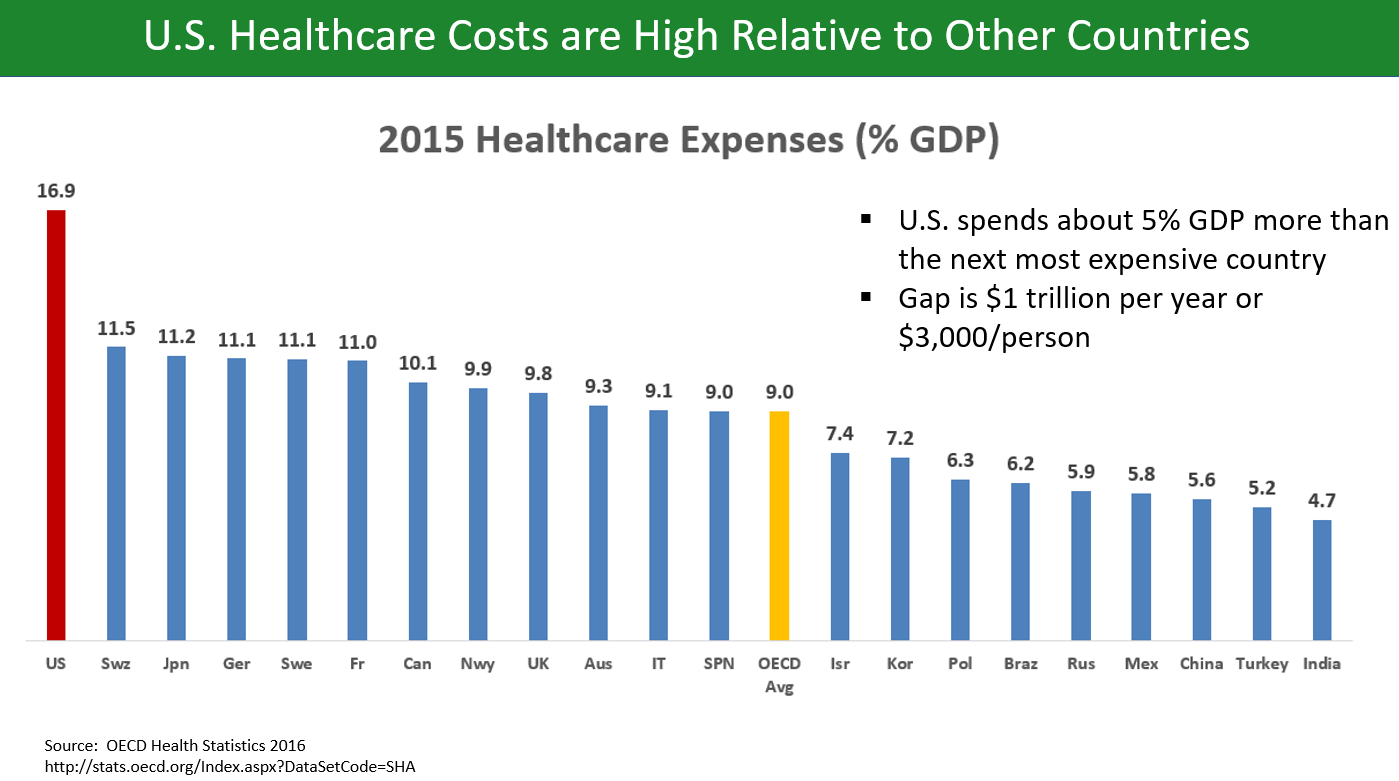
Bar chart comparing healthcare costs as percentage of GDP across OECD countries

There are many reasons why U.S. healthcare costs are higher than other OECD countries:

- Administrative costs. About 25% of U.S. healthcare costs relate to administrative costs (e.g., billing and payment, as opposed to direct provision of services, supplies and medicine) versus 10-15% in other countries. For example, Duke University Hospital had 900 hospital beds but 1,300 billing clerks during 2013. Assuming $3.2 trillion is spent on healthcare per year, a 10% savings would be $320 billion per year and a 15% savings would be nearly $500 billion per year. For scale, cutting administrative costs to peer country levels would represent roughly one-third to half the gap. A 2009 study from Price Waterhouse Coopers estimated $210 billion in savings from unnecessary billing and administrative costs, a figure that would be considerably higher in 2015 dollars.
- Cost variation across hospital regions. Harvard economist David Cutler reported in 2013 that roughly 33% of healthcare spending, or about $1 trillion per year, is not associated with improved outcomes. Medicare reimbursements per enrollee vary significantly across the country. In 2012, average Medicare reimbursements per enrollee ranged from an adjusted (for health status, income, and ethnicity) $6,724 in the lowest spending region to $13,596 in the highest.
- The U.S. spends more than other countries for the same things. Drugs are more expensive, doctors are paid more, and suppliers charge more for medical equipment than other countries. Journalist Todd Hixon reported on a study that U.S. spending on physicians per person is about five times higher than peer countries, $1,600 versus $310, as much as 37% of the gap with other countries. This was driven by a greater use of specialist doctors, who charge 3-6 times more in the U.S. than in peer countries. The OECD reported that in 2013 the U.S. spent $1,026 per capita on pharmaceuticals (drugs) versus an OECD average of around $515. The cost of an MRI in Canada is approximately $300, versus $1,000 in the U.S.
- Higher level of per-capita income, which is correlated with higher healthcare spending in the U.S. and other countries. Hixon reported a study by Princeton Professor Uwe Reinhardt that concluded about $1,200 per person (in 2008 dollars) or about a third of the gap with peer countries in healthcare spending was due to higher levels of per-capita income. Higher income per-capita is correlated with using more units of healthcare.
- Americans receive more medical care than people in other countries. The U.S. consumes 3 times as many mammograms, 2.5x the number of MRI scans, and 31% more C-sections per-capita than peer countries. This is a blend of higher per-capita income and higher use of specialists, among other factors.
- The U.S. government intervenes less actively to force down prices in the United States than in other countries. In the U.S., government accounts for 48% of healthcare spending, versus 76% in Europe; this ratio of spending can be viewed as a proxy for bargaining power. Stanford economist Victor Fuchs wrote in 2014: "If we turn the question around and ask why healthcare costs so much less in other high-income countries, the answer nearly always points to a larger, stronger role for government. Governments usually eliminate much of the high administrative costs of insurance, obtain lower prices for inputs, and influence the mix of healthcare outputs by arranging for large supplies of primary-care physicians and hospital beds while keeping tight control on the number of specialist physicians and expensive technology. In the United States, the political system creates many "choke points" for diverse interest groups to block or modify government's role in these areas."

In December 2011, the outgoing Administrator of the Centers for Medicare & Medicaid Services, Dr. Donald Berwick, asserted that 20% to 30% of health care spending is waste. He listed five causes for the waste: (1) overtreatment of patients, (2) the failure to coordinate care, (3) the administrative complexity of the health care system, (4) burdensome rules and (5) fraud.

The Institute of Medicine reported in September 2012 that approximately $750B per year in U.S. health care costs are avoidable or wasted. This included: unnecessary services ($210 billion annually); inefficient delivery of care ($130 billion); excess administrative costs ($190 billion); inflated prices ($105 billion); prevention failures ($55 billion), and fraud ($75 billion).

=== Relative to prior years ===
The Congressional Budget Office analyzed the reasons for healthcare cost inflation over time, reporting in 2008 that: "Although many factors contributed to the growth, most analysts have concluded that the bulk of the long-term rise resulted from the health care system's use of new medical services that were made possible by technological advances..." In summarizing several studies, CBO reported the following drove the indicated share of the increase (shown as a range across three studies) from 1940 to 1990:

- Technology changes: 38-65%. CBO defined this as "any changes in clinical practice that enhance the ability of providers to diagnose, treat, or prevent health problems."
- Personal income growth: 5-23%. Persons with more income tend to spend a greater share of it on healthcare.
- Administrative costs: 3-13%.
- Aging of the population: 2%. As the country ages, more persons require more expensive treatments, as the aged tend to be sicker.

Several studies have attempted to explain the reduction in the rate of annual increase following the Great Recession of 2007–2009. Reasons include, among others:

- Higher unemployment due to the recession, which has limited the ability of consumers to purchase healthcare;
- Rising out-of-pocket payments;
- Deductibles (the amount a person pays before insurance begins to cover claims) have risen sharply. Workers must pay a larger share of their own health costs, and generally forces them to spend less; and
- The proportion of workers with employer-sponsored health insurance enrolled in a plan that required a deductible climbed to about three-quarters in 2012 from about half in 2006.

In September 2008 The Wall Street Journal reported that consumers were reducing their health care spending in response to the current economic slow-down. Both the number of prescriptions filled and the number of office visits dropped between 2007 and 2008. In one survey, 22% of consumers reported going to the doctor less often, and 11% reported buying fewer prescription drugs.

== Cost forecasts ==
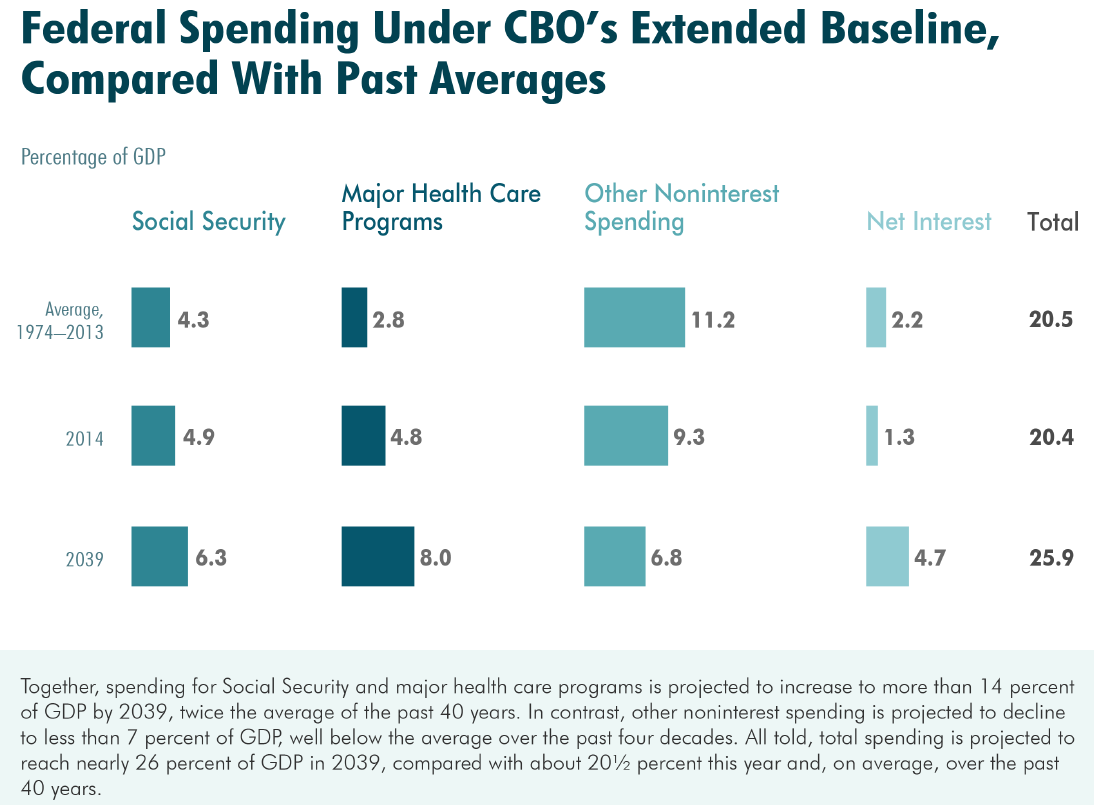
Spending for government healthcare programs is projected to rise significantly relative to GDP in the upcoming decades.

The Health and Human Services Department expects that the health share of GDP will continue its historical upward trend, reaching 19.6% of GDP by 2024.

The non-partisan Congressional Budget Office (CBO) reported in March 2017 that healthcare cost inflation and an aging population are primary drivers of increasing budget deficits over time, as outlays (spending) continue to rise faster than revenues relative to GDP. CBO forecast that spending on major healthcare programs (including Medicare and Medicaid) would rise from 5.5% GDP in 2017 to 9.2% GDP by 2047.

The Medicare Trustees provide an annual report of the program's finances. The forecasts from 2009 and 2015 differ materially, mainly due to changes in the projected rate of healthcare cost increases, which have moderated considerably. Rather than rising to nearly 12% GDP over the forecast period (through 2080) as forecast in 2009, the 2015 forecast has Medicare costs rising to 6% GDP, comparable to the Social Security program.

The increase in healthcare costs is one of the primary drivers of long-term budget deficits. The long-term budget situation has considerably improved in the 2015 forecast versus the 2009 forecast per the Trustees Report.

== Payment systems ==
Doctors and hospitals are generally funded by payments from patients and insurance plans in return for services rendered (fee-for-service or FFS). In the FFS payment model, each service provided is billed as an individual item, which creates an incentive to provide more services (e.g., more tests, more expensive procedures, and more medicines). This is in contrast to bundled payments, in which the amount the insurer will pay to the service providers is bundled per episode (e.g., for a heart attack patient, a total amount will be paid to the network providing the care for say 180 days). Bundling on a per patient basis (rather than per-episode) was referred to in the 1990s as a "capitated payment" but is now described as an accountable care organization. Bundling provides an incentive to lower costs, which requires offsetting measures and incentives for quality of care. Several best-practice healthcare systems, such as the Kaiser and Mayo health systems, use bundled payments.

Among those whose employer pays for health insurance, the employee may be required to contribute part of the cost of this insurance, while the employer usually chooses the insurance company and, for large groups, negotiates with the insurance company. In 2004, private insurance paid for 36% of personal health expenditures, private out-of-pocket 15%, federal government 34%, state and local governments 11%, and other private funds 4%. Due to "a dishonest and inefficient system" that sometimes inflates bills to ten times the actual cost, even insured patients can be billed more than the real cost of their care.

Insurance for dental and vision care (except for visits to ophthalmologists, which are covered by regular health insurance) is usually sold separately. Prescription drugs are often handled differently from medical services, including by the government programs. Major federal laws regulating the insurance industry include COBRA and HIPAA.

Individuals with private or government insurance are limited to medical facilities which accept the particular type of medical insurance they carry. Visits to facilities outside the insurance program's "network" are usually either not covered or the patient must bear more of the cost. Hospitals negotiate with insurance programs to set reimbursement rates; some rates for government insurance programs are set by law. The sum paid to a doctor for a service rendered to an insured patient is generally less than that paid "out of pocket" by an uninsured patient. In return for this discount, the insurance company includes the doctor as part of their "network", which means more patients are eligible for lowest-cost treatment there. The negotiated rate may not cover the cost of the service, but providers (hospitals and doctors) can refuse to accept a given type of insurance, including Medicare and Medicaid. Low reimbursement rates have generated complaints from providers, and some patients with government insurance have difficulty finding nearby providers for certain types of medical services.

Charity care for those who cannot pay is sometimes available, and is usually funded by non-profit foundations, religious orders, government subsidies, or services donated by the employees. Massachusetts and New Jersey have programs where the state will pay for health care when the patient cannot afford to do so. The City and County of San Francisco is also implementing a citywide health care program for all uninsured residents, limited to those whose incomes and net worth are below an eligibility threshold. Some cities and counties operate or provide subsidies to private facilities open to all regardless of the ability to pay. Means testing is applied, and some patients of limited means may be charged for the services they use.

The Emergency Medical Treatment and Active Labor Act requires virtually all hospitals to accept all patients, regardless of the ability to pay, for emergency room care. The act does not provide access to non-emergency room care for patients who cannot afford to pay for health care, nor does it provide the benefit of preventive care and the continuity of a primary care physician. Emergency health care is generally more expensive than an urgent care clinic or a doctor's office visit, especially if a condition has worsened due to putting off needed care. Emergency rooms are typically at, near, or over capacity. Long wait times have become a problem nationally, and in urban areas some ERs are put on "diversion" on a regular basis, meaning that ambulances are directed to bring patients elsewhere.

=== Private ===
Most Americans under age 65 (59.3%) receive their health insurance coverage through an employer (which includes both private as well as civilian public-sector employers) under group coverage, although this percentage is declining. Costs for employer-paid health insurance are rising rapidly: since 2001, premiums for family coverage have increased 78%, while wages have risen 19% and inflation has risen 17%, according to a 2007 study by the Kaiser Family Foundation. Workers with employer-sponsored insurance also contribute; in 2007, the average percentage of premium paid by covered workers is 16% for single coverage and 28% for family coverage. In addition to their premium contributions, most covered workers face additional payments when they use health care services, in the form of deductibles and copayments.

Just less than 9% of the population purchases individual health care insurance. Insurance payments are a form of cost-sharing and risk management where each individual or their employer pays predictable monthly premiums. This cost-spreading mechanism often picks up much of the cost of health care, but individuals must often pay up-front a minimum part of the total cost (a deductible), or a small part of the cost of every procedure (a copayment). Private insurance accounts for 35% of total health spending in the United States, by far the largest share among OECD countries. Beside the United States, Canada and France are the two other OECD countries where private insurance represents more than 10% of total health spending.

Provider networks can be used to reduce costs by negotiating favorable fees from providers, selecting cost effective providers, and creating financial incentives for providers to practice more efficiently. A survey issued in 2009 by America's Health Insurance Plans found that patients going to out-of-network providers are sometimes charged extremely high fees.

Defying many analysts' expectations, PPOs have gained market share at the expense of HMOs over the past decade.

Just as the more loosely managed PPOs have edged out HMOs, HMOs themselves have also evolved towards less tightly managed models. The first HMOs in the U.S., such as Kaiser Permanente in Oakland, California, and the Health Insurance Plan (HIP) in New York, were "staff-model" HMOs, which owned their own health care facilities and employed the doctors and other health care professionals who staffed them. The name health maintenance organization stems from the idea that the HMO would make it its job to maintain the enrollee's health, rather than merely to treat illnesses. In accordance with this mission, managed care organizations typically cover preventive health care. Within the tightly integrated staff-model HMO, the HMO can develop and disseminate guidelines on cost-effective care, while the enrollee's primary care doctor can act as patient advocate and care coordinator, helping the patient negotiate the complex health care system. Despite a substantial body of research demonstrating that many staff-model HMOs deliver high-quality and cost-effective care, they have steadily lost market share. They have been replaced by more loosely managed networks of providers with whom health plans have negotiated discounted fees. It is common today for a physician or hospital to have contracts with a dozen or more health plans, each with different referral networks, contracts with different diagnostic facilities, and different practice guidelines.

=== Public ===
Government programs directly cover 27.8% of the population (83 million), including the elderly, disabled, children, veterans, and some of the poor, and federal law mandates public access to emergency services regardless of ability to pay. Public spending accounts for between 45% and 56.1% of U.S. health care spending. Per-capita spending on health care by the U.S. government placed it among the top ten highest spenders among United Nations member countries in 2004.

However, all government-funded healthcare programs exist only in the form of statutory law, and accordingly can be amended or revoked like any other statute. There is no constitutional right to healthcare. The U.S. Supreme Court explained in 1977 that "the Constitution imposes no obligation on the States to pay ... any of the medical expenses of indigents."

Government funded programs include:

- Medicare, generally covering citizens and long-term residents 65 years and older and the disabled.
- Medicaid, generally covering low income people in certain categories, including children, pregnant women, and the disabled. (Administered by the states.)
- State Children's Health Insurance Program, which provides health insurance for low-income children who do not qualify for Medicaid. (Administered by the states, with matching state funds.)
- Various programs for federal employees, including TRICARE for military personnel (for use in civilian facilities)
- The Veterans Administration, which provides care to veterans, their families, and survivors through medical centers and clinics.
- Title X which funds reproductive health care
- State and local health department clinics
- Indian health service
- National Institutes of Health treats patients who enroll in research for free.
- Medical Corps of various branches of the military.
- Certain county and state hospitals
- Government run community clinics

The exemption of employer-sponsored health benefits from federal income and payroll taxes distorts the health care market. The U.S. government, unlike some other countries, does not treat employer funded health care benefits as a taxable benefit in kind to the employee. The value of the lost tax revenue from a benefits in kind tax is an estimated $150 billion a year. Some regard this as being disadvantageous to people who have to buy insurance in the individual market which must be paid from income received after tax.

Health insurance benefits are an attractive way for employers to increase the salary of employees as they are nontaxable. As a result, 65% of the non-elderly population and over 90% of the privately insured non-elderly population receives health insurance at the workplace. Additionally, most economists agree that this tax shelter increases individual demand for health insurance, leading some to claim that it is largely responsible for the rise in health care spending.

In addition the government allows full tax shelter at the highest marginal rate to investors in health savings accounts (HSAs). Some have argued that this tax incentive adds little value to national health care as a whole because the most wealthy in society tend also to be the most healthy. Also it has been argued, HSAs segregate the insurance pools into those for the wealthy and those for the less wealthy which thereby makes equivalent insurance cheaper for the rich and more expensive for the poor. However, one advantage of health insurance accounts is that funds can only be used towards certain HSA qualified expenses, including medicine, doctor's fees, and Medicare Parts A and B. Funds cannot be used towards expenses such as cosmetic surgery.

There are also various state and local programs for the poor. In 2007, Medicaid provided health care coverage for 39.6 million low-income Americans (although Medicaid covers approximately 40% of America's poor), and Medicare provided health care coverage for 41.4 million elderly and disabled Americans. Enrollment in Medicare is expected to reach 77 million by 2031, when the baby boom generation is fully enrolled.

It has been reported that the number of physicians accepting Medicaid has decreased in recent years due to relatively high administrative costs and low reimbursements. In 1997, the federal government also created the State Children's Health Insurance Program (SCHIP), a joint federal-state program to insure children in families that earn too much to qualify for Medicaid but cannot afford health insurance. SCHIP covered 6.6 million children in 2006, but the program is already facing funding shortfalls in many states. The government has also mandated access to emergency care regardless of insurance status and ability to pay through the Emergency Medical Treatment and Labor Act (EMTALA), passed in 1986, but EMTALA is an unfunded mandate.

== The uninsured ==
=== Number of uninsured ===
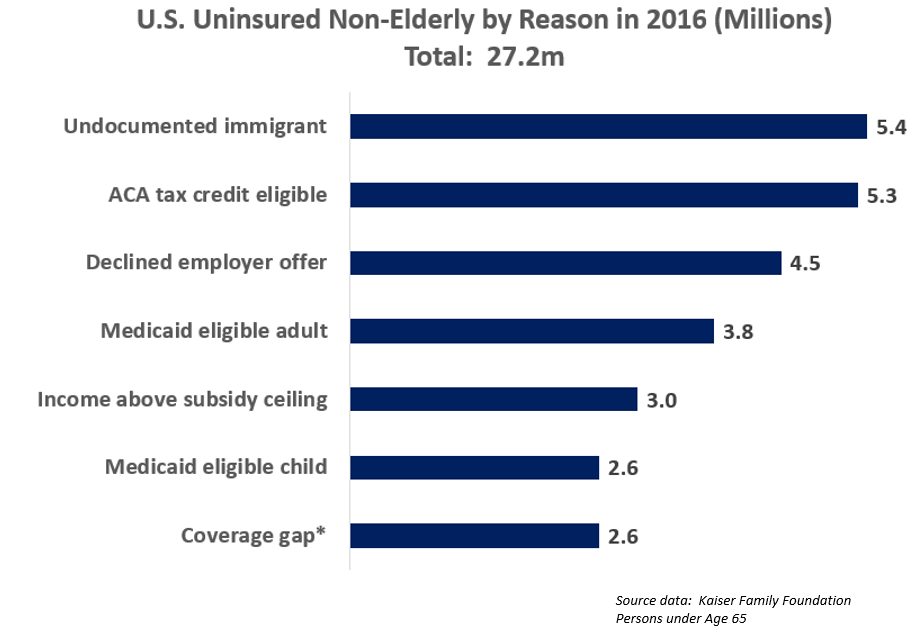
Number U.S. uninsured by reason in 2016 (non-elderly/under 65 years of age). An estimated 43% of the uninsured were eligible for financial assistance.

The percentage of persons without health insurance (the "uninsured") fell from 13.3% in 2013 to 8.8% in 2016, due primarily to the Affordable Care Act. The number of uninsured fell from 41.8 million in 2013 to 28.0 million in 2016, a decline of 13.8 million. The number of persons with insurance (public or private) rose from 271.6 million in 2013 to 292.3 million in 2016, an increase of 20.7 million. In 2016, approximately 68% were covered by private plans, while 37% were covered by government plans; these do not add to 100% because some people have both.

=== Impact on costs ===
Some Americans do not qualify for government-provided health insurance, are not provided health insurance by an employer, and are unable to afford, cannot qualify for, or choose not to purchase, private health insurance. When charity or "uncompensated" care is not available, they sometimes simply go without needed medical treatment. This problem has become a source of considerable political controversy on a national level. The uninsured still receive emergency care and thus if they are unable to afford it, they impose costs on others who pay higher premiums and deductibles to cover these expenses indirectly. Estimates for 2008 reported that the uninsured would spend $30 billion for healthcare and receive $56 billion in uncompensated care, and that if everyone were covered by insurance then overall costs would increase by $123 billion. A 2003 Institute of Medicine (IOM) report estimated total cost of health care provided to the uninsured at $98.9 billion in 2001, including $26.4 billion in out-of-pocket spending by the uninsured, with $34.5 billion in "free" "uncompensated" care covered by government subsidies of $30.6 billion to hospitals and clinics and $5.1 billion in donated services by physicians.

A 2003 study in Health Affairs estimated that uninsured people in the U.S. received approximately $35 billion in uncompensated care in 2001. The study noted that this amount per capita was half what the average insured person received. The study found that various levels of government finance most uncompensated care, spending about $30.6 billion on payments and programs to serve the uninsured and covering as much as 80–85% of uncompensated care costs through grants and other direct payments, tax appropriations, and Medicare and Medicaid payment add-ons. Most of this money comes from the federal government, followed by state and local tax appropriations for hospitals. Another study by the same authors in the same year estimated the additional annual cost of covering the uninsured (in 2001 dollars) at $34 billion (for public coverage) and $69 billion (for private coverage). These estimates represent an increase in total health care spending of 3–6% and would raise health care's share of GDP by less than one percentage point, the study concluded. Another study published in the same journal in 2004 estimated that the value of health forgone each year because of uninsurance was $65–$130 billion and concluded that this figure constituted "a lower-bound estimate of economic losses resulting from the present level of uninsurance nationally."

== Role of government in health care market ==
Numerous publicly funded health care programs help to provide for the elderly, disabled, military service families and veterans, children, and the poor, and federal law ensures public access to emergency services regardless of ability to pay; however, a system of universal health care has not been implemented nationwide. However, as the OECD has pointed out, the total U.S. public expenditure for this limited population would, in most other OECD countries, be enough for the government to provide primary health insurance for the entire population. Although the federal Medicare program and the federal-state Medicaid programs possess some monopsonistic purchasing power, the highly fragmented buy side of the U.S. health system is relatively weak by international standards, and in some areas, some suppliers such as large hospital groups have a virtual monopoly on the supply side. In most OECD countries, there is a high degree of public ownership and public finance. The resulting economy of scale in providing health care services appears to enable a much tighter grip on costs. The U.S., as a matter of oft-stated public policy, largely does not regulate prices of services from private providers, assuming the private sector to do it better.

Massachusetts has adopted a universal health care system through the Massachusetts 2006 Health Reform Statute. It mandates that all residents who can afford to do so purchase health insurance, provides subsidized insurance plans so that nearly everyone can afford health insurance, and provides a "Health Safety Net Fund" to pay for necessary treatment for those who cannot find affordable health insurance or are not eligible.

In July 2009, Connecticut passed into law a plan called SustiNet, with the goal of achieving health care coverage of 98% of its residents by 2014.

== Proposed solutions ==
Primary cost reduction opportunities correspond to the causes described above. These include:

- Eliminating administrative overhead through a single-payer, "Medicare for All" approach, to reduce overhead from the current 25% of expenditures to the 10-15% level of best practice countries.
- Granting the government additional power to reduce the compensation of doctors and hospitals, as it does with Medicare and Medicaid. This would likely occur with a single-payer solution.
- Shifting from expensive intervention at the end-of-life to more low-cost palliative care, to address healthcare cost concentration among those in the last years of life.
- Allowing the government to negotiate more forcefully to reduce the costs of prescription drugs, which are roughly twice the cost per-capita in other countries.
- Using more bundled payment strategies, to limit costs while maintaining quality.
- Reducing Medicare and Medicaid fraud, with stronger controls (auditors and processes) and legal penalties.
- Improved use of healthcare technology, to improve efficiency and eliminate errors.

Increased spending on disease prevention is often suggested as a way of reducing health care spending. Whether prevention saves or costs money depends on the intervention. Childhood vaccinations, or contraceptives save much more than they cost. Research suggests that in many cases prevention does not produce significant long-term cost savings. Some interventions may be cost-effective by providing health benefits, while others are not cost-effective. Preventive care is typically provided to many people who would never become ill, and for those who would have become ill is partially offset by the health care costs during additional years of life. On the other hand, research conducted by Novartis argues that the countries that have excelled in getting the highest value for healthcare spending are the ones who have invested more in prevention, early diagnosis and treatment. The trick is to avoid getting patients to hospital, which is where highest healthcare dollars are being consumed. Not all preventive measures have good ROI (for example, a global vaccination campaign for a rare infectious disease). However, preventive measures such as improved diet, exercise and reduction of tobacco intake would have broad impact on many diseases and will offer good return of investment.
