= Independent Payment Advisory Board =

- Abbreviation: IPAB
- Formation: 2010
- Location: Washington D.C., United States

The Independent Payment Advisory Board (IPAB) was to be a fifteen-member United States government agency created in 2010 by sections 3403 and 10320 of the Patient Protection and Affordable Care Act which was to have the explicit task of achieving specified savings in Medicare without affecting coverage or quality. Under previous and current law, changes to Medicare payment rates and program rules are recommended by MedPAC but require an act of Congress to take effect. The system creating IPAB granted IPAB the authority to make changes to the Medicare program with the Congress being given the power to overrule the agency's decisions through supermajority vote. The Bipartisan Budget Act of 2018 repealed IPAB before it could take effect.

Beginning in 2013, the Chief Actuary of the Centers for Medicare and Medicaid Services determined in particular years the projected per capita growth rate for Medicare for a multi-year period ending in the second year thereafter (the "implementation year"). If the projection exceeded a target growth rate, IPAB was to develop a proposal to reduce Medicare spending in the implementation year by a specified amount. If it was required to develop a proposal, the Board was to submit that proposal in January of the year before the implementation year; thus, the first proposal could have been submitted in January 2014 to take effect in 2015. If the Board failed to submit a proposal that the Chief Actuary certifies would achieve the savings target, the Secretary of Health and Human Services was to submit a proposal that would achieve that amount of savings. The Secretary was then to implement the proposal unless Congress enacted resolutions to override the Board's (or the Secretary's) decisions under a fast-track procedure that the law set forth.

A related group, the Specialty Society Relative Value Scale Update Committee (or Relative Value Update Committee; RUC), composed of physicians associated with the American Medical Association, also advises the government about pay standards for Medicare patient procedures, according to news reports.

On February 9, 2018, the United States Congress voted to repeal the Independent Payment Advisory Board as a part of the Bipartisan Budget Act of 2018, by a vote of 71−28 in the US Senate and by a vote of 240−186 in US House of Representatives. Shortly thereafter that day, President Trump signed the budget bill into law, thereby repealing the IPAB.

== Background ==
Congress created IPAB as a strengthened version of the Medicare Payment Advisory Commission (MedPAC), a body with no regulatory power that solely advises Congress, but cannot enact regulations in and of itself. Since 1997, MedPAC had recommended cuts totaling "hundreds of billions of dollars" to Medicare that were ignored by Congress. Congress has pressured Medicare administrators to cover "ineffective or needlessly costly methods of care," while Medicare's founding legislation says "Nothing in this title shall be construed to authorize any Federal officer or employee to exercise any supervision or control over the practice of medicine." Henry Aaron, a health care expert at the Brookings Institution, said that many observers saw that some in Congress are "in thrall to campaign contributors and producers and suppliers of medical services" and most are not well enough informed to wisely use Medicare's buying power to reform health care. The idea behind the IPAB was to take power away from Congress (and special interests) in order to give it to those knowledgeable in health care policy.

=== Legislative history ===
On June 25, 2009, Senator Jay Rockefeller introduced the Medicare Payment Advisory Commission Reform Act of 2009, which would have changed MedPAC into an executive branch agency. On July 17, 2009, the Obama administration submitted to Congress a similar proposal called the Independent Medicare Advisory Council Act, which would have created an independent five-member executive council to make recommendations to the president. From June 17 to September 14, 2009, three Democratic and three Republican Senate Finance Committee members met for a series of thirty-one meetings to discuss the development of a health care reform bill. During this period, Senators Max Baucus (D-Montana), Chuck Grassley (R-Iowa), Kent Conrad (D-North Dakota), Olympia Snowe (R-Maine), Jeff Bingaman (D-New Mexico), and Mike Enzi (R-Wyoming), met for more than sixty hours, and their discussions established the principles upon which the health care reform legislation that later passed was based. The Finance Committee included a provision establishing an independent Medicare advisory board in its health reform legislation, which passed the Senate on December 24, 2009.

== Mission ==
IPAB was tasked with developing specific proposals to bring the net growth in Medicare spending back to target levels if the Medicare Actuary determines that net spending was forecast to exceed target levels, beginning in 2015.

With regard to IPAB's recommendations, the law said: "The proposal shall not include any recommendation to ration health care, raise revenues or Medicare beneficiary premiums under section 1818, 1818A, or 1839, increase Medicare beneficiary cost sharing (including deductibles, coinsurance, and co-payments), or otherwise restrict benefits or modify eligibility criteria." The Department of Health and Human Services (HHS) was to implement these proposals unless Congress adopted equally effective alternatives. The board was also to be required to submit to Congress annual reports on health care costs, access, quality, and utilization. IPAB was to submit to Congress recommendations on how to slow the growth in total private health care expenditures.

Every year, on September 1, IPAB was to submit a draft proposal to the Secretary of Health and Human Services. On January 15 of the next year, IPAB was to submit a proposal to Congress. If IPAB failed to meet this deadline, the HHS was to create its own proposal. Congress was to consider this proposal under special rules. Congress could not consider any amendment to the proposal that would not achieve similar cost reductions unless both houses of Congress, including a three-fifths super majority in the Senate, voted to waive this requirement. If Congress failed to adopt a substitute provision by August 15, HHS was to implement the proposal as originally submitted to Congress.

== Membership and term of office ==
IPAB was to be composed of fifteen members appointed by the President, subject to Senate confirmation. The Secretary of Health and Human Services, the Administrator of the Center for Medicare and Medicaid Services, and the Administrator of the Health Resources and Services Administration were to serve ex officio as nonvoting members. In making the appointments, the President was to consult with the Majority Leader of the Senate concerning the appointment of three members; the Speaker of the House of Representatives concerning the appointment of three members, the Minority Leader of the Senate concerning the appointment of three members, and the Minority Leader of the House of Representatives concerning the appointment of three members.

The first members appointed to the Board were to be divided into three staggered classes in order to ensure that their terms would not expire simultaneously. Five were to be appointed for a term of one year, five were to be appointed for a term of three years, and five were to be appointed for a term of six years. All subsequent appointments were to be made for six years. A member was not to serve more than two full consecutive terms.

Appointed members of the IPAB were to include individuals with national recognition for their expertise in health finance and economics, actuarial science, health facility management, health plans and integrated delivery systems, health facilities reimbursement, and other providers of health services or related fields to provide a mix of professionals, a broad geographic representation, and a balance between urban and rural areas. IPAB members were to include (but will not be limited to) physicians and other health professionals, experts in the area of pharmaco-economics or prescription drug benefit programs, employers, third-party payers, individuals skilled in the conduct and interpretation of biomedical, health services, and health economics research, and expertise in outcomes and effectiveness research and technology assessment. Members also were to include individuals representing consumers and the elderly. Individuals who were directly involved in providing or managing the delivery of Medicare items and services were not to constitute a majority of IPAB's membership.

The President of the United States was to establish a system for public disclosure by IPAB members of any financial and other potential conflicts of interest. No IPAB member was to be engaged in any other business, vocation or employment.

Members were to be paid at a rate described in Level III of the Executive Schedule that determines pay for senior executive branch officials. As of 2010, this was $165,300 a year.

== Funding ==
Congress appropriated $15 million for IPAB in 2012. Future funding for the agency was to be based on this figure adjusted for inflation.

== Reception ==
=== Predicted outcomes ===
A 2009 Kaiser Health News article predicted primary care doctors would likely see benefits from an "independent Medicare commission because the panel would be more likely to increase their fees and lower specialists' rates." While payment cuts to hospitals and hospices were to be off-limits until 2020, and clinical laboratories were to be off limits until 2016, physician fees could have been cut unless a doc fix to Medicare's sustainable growth rate formula made those cuts off limits. Other "savings would have to have been found in private Medicare Advantage plans, Medicare's Part D prescription-drug program, or spending on skilled-nursing facilities, home-based health care, dialysis, durable medical equipment, ambulance services, and services of ambulatory surgical centers". According to the New England Journal of Medicine, holding off creation of accountable care organizations (ACOs) was likely to be a bad long term strategy for physicians.

Critics of IPAB charged that the board's cost-cutting mandate would inevitably bring about a reduction in care, despite the anti-rationing language in the bill. Congressman Phil Roe from Tennessee, a doctor, warned that IPAB would ration care through payment policy. American Medical News charged that the bill gave IPAB "unprecedented, dangerous authority to cut Medicare pay rates and strangle access to care."

=== Experts ===
Health economist Uwe Reinhardt thought that given the "dubious style of campaign financing of which we all are victims now," an independent Medicare commission was the U.S.'s only hope to restrain Medicare spending. Reinhardt criticized former chairman of the House Ways and Means Subcommittee on Health William Thomas' 1995 comment as emblematic of the spurious reasoning found in Congress. Of a payment system that resembled bundled payment, Thomas said, "I'm not wild about a payment system that involves telling a bunch of innovative entrepreneurs that they can't be in the business anymore". Reinhardt criticized this, saying Thomas "seemed uninterested in what made more clinical and economic sense. His was purely an industrial policy, not a health policy. And his reasoning explains why, year in year out, Congress has rejected economically sensible proposals to attain greater efficiency in the Medicare program." Reinhardt compares the IPAB to a similar board in Germany, which he says is efficient, effective and civilized.

==== Former CBO directors ====
Peter Orszag, who directed the CBO and OMB in the Obama administration, said the IPAB may have been the most important aspect of the Affordable Care Act. He said the board was "created to help address our long-term fiscal imbalance while boosting quality in health care". "It's a very promising structure," said Orszag, but he cautioned that "whether it realizes its potential depends on how it's implemented."

Douglas Holtz-Eakin, a former CBO director and an economist who is currently president of a conservative political organization, thought that despite "requirements that would force Congress to adopt the recommendations or find comparable savings," "cuts will be politically infeasible, as Congress is likely to continue regularly to override scheduled reductions." In the words of Susan Dentzer, editor of Health Affairs, Holtz-Eakin thought no IPAB "will ever succeed in saving lawmakers from their own self-preserving instincts to pander."

=== Politicians ===
Sen. John Cornyn, a Republican from Texas, introduced a bill in the Senate to prevent the creation of the IPAB. The Washington Post reported that Congressman and retired physician Phil Roe (R-TN) twice sponsored House bills to eliminate the IPAB, which was partially why he was regarded as a "kindred soul" by the medical industry. Roe charged that IPAB would deny care. However, the legislation governing IPAB bared "any recommendation to ration health care."

Tom Daschle, the former Senate Democratic leader who was Obama's first choice for health secretary, argued that IPAB should have been expanded to cover all forms of health insurance in order to prevent doctors from shifting costs onto patients with private medical insurance. After voting for the 2010 health care reform, Pete Stark (D-Calif.), said that the IPAB "sets [Medicare] up for unsustainable cuts" that will endanger the health of patients, and that he would "work tirelessly to mitigate the damage" the panel would cause.

=== Lobbying groups ===
The Pharmaceutical Research and Manufacturers of America said that elimination of the payment board was its top priority in the 2011 Congress. The American Hospital Association and the American Medical Association (AMA) have spoken out against the board. The AMA wanted to change the IPAB requirement that members have no outside employment so working physicians could be considered. The AMA also opposed any independent commission which could cut physician payment rates.

Dr. J. Fred Ralston Jr., president of the American College of Physicians (ACP), expressed support for the idea behind the IPAB, saying "making complex Medicare payment and budgetary decisions is very difficult within a political process with substantial lobbying pressures," but the group wanted to see significant changes. The ACP supported creating a position for a primary care physician on IPAB, additional protections to ensure that cost reductions would not lead to lower quality of care, authority for Congress to reject proposals made by IPAB via a simple majority vote, and equal treatment of all healthcare providers.

Dr. Elaine C. Jones, government relations committee cochair of the American Academy of Neurology stated, "We are also very concerned about the power of the IPAB to cut payments to physicians. The sole function of the IPAB is to cut spending with little guarantee of maintaining quality, access, and scientifically proven care. There may be no physician representation on the board either. These elements are concerning and unacceptable."

Ron Pollack, the founding executive director of the health care advocacy group Families USA, advised Democrats against being divided and conquered by supporting repeal of specific portions of the health care reform, such as IPAB.

Two major nursing home associations, the American Health Care Association and the American Association of Homes and Services for the Aging, along with seventy two other healthcare groups, urged Congress to reject IPAB. They argued that the board would have had too much control over Medicare and would affect the ability of healthcare providers to lobby for changes in how they are reimbursed. The groups also argued that IPAB would have only been accountable to the president.

The American Academy of Orthopedic Surgeons made IPAB a focus of their advocacy work. Hospital exemptions from 2015 to 2020 as well as the lack of practicing physicians on the board itself were major concerns. Lobbying efforts in April 2011 focused on making these modifications if not fully eliminating the board.

Medical specialty groups spearheaded efforts to repeal IPAB. The American Society of Anesthesiologists and American Association of Neurological Surgeons co-lead a coalition of 26 medical specialties and patient organizations representing more than 350,000 physicians and their patients dedicated to repealing IPAB. The coalition endorsed efforts in the 113th Congress to repeal IPAB.

Howard Dean, a consultant for Washington, D.C.-based lobbying firm McKenna, Long and Aldridge and former Democratic Governor of Vermont, believed the IPAB would fail to control costs and should be abolished. He opposed the premise of the board, writing in The Wall Street Journal that it was "a health-care rationing body" and that "rate setting—the essential mechanism of the IPAB—has a 40-year track record of failure."

=== Editorials ===
In an editorial opposing Sen. Cornyn's bill to repeal IPAB The Washington Post wrote, "The political system failed when it came to controlling health-care costs. The 15-member panel that Mr. Cornyn et al. deride as 'beltway bureaucrats' would be a group of experts in the field, nominated by the president, chosen in part by congressional leaders of the opposing party and subject to Senate confirmation. Congress isn't bound by its proposals if lawmakers can come up with what they think is a better approach. Getting costs under control is going to require difficult choices – including, in the case of Medicare, difficult political choices. This unwise bill is not a good sign about Washington's willingness to make them."

=== Death panel controversy ===
The term "death panel" was used in conjunction with IPAB. Sarah Palin wrote in the Wall Street Journal that the National Commission on Fiscal Responsibility and Reform "implicitly endorses the use of "death panel"-like rationing by way of the new Independent Payments [sic] Advisory Board." The New York Times reported some Obama administration officials feared the Independent Payment Advisory Board could be "target for attacks of the 'death panel' sort"; An October 2010 National Right to Life article wrote the IPAB was "a good candidate for the title of 'death panel,'" and a December 2010 Wall Street Journal editorial associated 'death panels' with the IPAB.

Former OMB Director Orszag responded: "I think it's only in Washington, D.C., that a board created to help address our long-term fiscal imbalance while boosting quality in health care and that is specifically by law prohibited from rationing care could be called a death panel".

== Congressional Budget Office scoring ==
The Congressional Budget Office (CBO) estimated that IPAB would achieve Medicare spending reductions of $28 billion through 2019—amounting to 0.4 percent of the projected Medicare spending of ~$7 trillion for the period.

In March 2011, the CBO estimated the Medicare baseline level of spending would not exceed targets throughout the years of 2015 to 2021; thus, the IPAB was not expected to affect any Medicare spending.

== Fiscal commission report ==
The 2010 presidential commission, the National Commission on Fiscal Responsibility and Reform, issued a report on reducing the federal deficit and voted 11 to 7 to strengthen the IPAB. It wished to bring forward the time by which health care providers would be affected by IPAB decisions. The recommendations "would hit hospitals the hardest, which gained an exemption from the group's decisions for several years."

== Lawsuit ==
As part of legal challenges from conservative organizations and state attorneys general in about twenty states to the Affordable Care Act, Arizona's conservative Goldwater Institute, along with three Republican congressman from Arizona, filed a suit challenging the constitutionality of the IPAB. The Hill reported that "while the suit illustrates conservative frustration with the federal government, the courts rarely strike down advisory boards created by Congress." The suit was dismissed in 2012. The Ninth Circuit found for the government on appeal, and the Supreme Court declined to hear a further appeal.

== See also ==
- Health care rationing
- Healthcare reform in the United States
- Medicare Payment Advisory Commission
- Specialty Society Relative Value Scale Update Committee
