= E&M =

E&M may stand for:

- E and M signaling, a type of supervisory line signaling that uses DC signals on separate leads
- Encrypt-and-MAC (E&M), an approach to authenticated encryption
- Electromagnetism, sometimes also called electricity and magnetism, a branch of physics
- Electromechanics, combines electrical engineering and mechanical engineering
- Evaluation and Management Coding, a medical billing process in the United States
- Exchange and Mart, a defunct long-established British sales publication
- AP Physics C: Electricity and Magnetism, also known as AP E&M, an advanced placement course
- Mechatronics, a portmanteau of electronics and mechanics
