= Evaluation and Management Coding =

Medical billing process in the US

Evaluation and management coding (commonly known as E/M coding or E&M coding) is a medical coding process in support of medical billing. Practicing health care providers in the United States must use E/M coding to be reimbursed by Medicare, Medicaid programs, or private insurance for patient encounters.

E/M standards and guidelines were established by Congress in 1995 and revised in 1997. It has been adopted by private health insurance companies as the standard guidelines for determining type and severity of patient conditions. This allows medical service providers to document and bill for reimbursement for services provided.

E/M codes are based on the Current Procedural Terminology (CPT) codes established by the American Medical Association (AMA). For outpatient and office visits with established patients, code selection (such as CPT 99213 for low complexity or CPT 99214 for moderate complexity) is determined either by the level of medical decision making (MDM) or by total encounter time on the date of service (20–29 minutes for 99213 and 30–39 minutes for 99214), and may be billed alongside the HCPCS add-on code G2211 for longitudinal care of complex conditions. In 2010, new codes were added to the E/M Coding set, for prolonged services without direct face-to-face contact.

The American Medical Association (AMA) introduced a new subsection, “Telemedicine Services,” to the Evaluation and Management (E/M) section for 2025 along with seventeen new telemedicine codes and new telemedicine coding guidelines. The new Current Procedural Terminology (CPT®) codes effective as of January 1, 2025, which better reflect the resources needed to provide these services, are divided into encounters that take place through a real-time audio and video connection or a real-time audio-only connection.

== See also ==
- Resource-based relative value scale
