= Relative value unit =

Measurement used in United States Medicare

Relative value units (RVUs) are a measure of value used in the United States Medicare reimbursement formula for physician services. RVUs are a part of the resource-based relative value scale (RBRVS).

== Background ==
Before RVUs were used, Medicare paid for physician services using "usual, customary and reasonable" rate-setting which led to payment variability. The Omnibus Budget Reconciliation Act of 1989 enacted a Medicare fee schedule, and as of 2010 about 7,000 distinct physician services were listed. The services are classified under a nomenclature based on the Current Procedural Terminology (CPT) to which the American Medical Association holds intellectual property rights. Each service in the fee schedule is scored under the resource-based relative value scale (RBRVS) to determine a payment.

== Use ==
For each service, a payment formula contains three RVUs, one for physician work, one for practice expense, and one for malpractice expense. On average, the proportion of costs for Medicare are 52%, 44% and 4%, respectively. The three RVUs for a given service are each multiplied by a unique geographic practice cost index, referred to as the GPCI adjustment. The GPCI adjustment has been implemented to account for differences in wages and overhead costs across regions of the country. The sum of the three geographically weighted RVU values is then multiplied by the Medicare conversion factor to obtain a final price. Historically, a private group of 29 (mostly specialist) physicians—the American Medical Association's Specialty Society Relative Value Scale Update Committee (RUC)—have largely determined Medicare's RVU physician work values. In diagnostic radiology, physician work RVUs vary according to the anatomical scope documented under Current Procedural Terminology (CPT); for example, a complete upper abdominal ultrasound (CPT 76700) carries a work RVU of 0.81, whereas a limited single-quadrant or focused liver scan (CPT 76705) is assigned a work RVU of 0.59.

== See also ==
- Healthcare Common Procedure Coding System
