= Specialty Society Relative Value Scale Update Committee =

Healthcare reform advocacy group

The Specialty Society Relative Value Scale Update Committee or Relative Value Update Committee (RUC, pronounced "ruck") is a volunteer group of the American Medical Association that makes recommendations on the relative value of types of procedure done by physicians. These recommendations, if accepted by the U.S. Centers for Medicare & Medicaid Services, are used to compute health care prices in the United States' public health insurance program Medicare.

== Background ==
Before the 1992 implementation of the Medicare fee schedule, physician payments were made under the "usual, customary and reasonable" payment model (a "charge-based" payment system). Physician services were largely considered to be misvalued under this system, with evaluation and management services being undervalued and procedures overvalued. Third-party payers (public and private health insurance) advocated an improved model to replace the UCR fees, which had been associated with stark examples of specialists making significantly higher sums of money than primary care physicians.

With reference to the research of William Hsiao and colleagues, the Omnibus Budget Reconciliation Act of 1989 was passed with the legislative intent of reducing the payment disparity between primary care and other specialties through use of the resource-based relative value scale (RBRVS). Beginning in 2000, all three components of the Medicare RBRVS, physician work, practice expense and malpractice expense are resource-based as required by Section 1848(c) of the Social Security Act.

== Workings ==
RUC was established in 1991 by the American Medical Association (AMA) and medical specialist groups. The AMA sponsors RUC "both as an exercise of 'its First Amendment rights to petition the Federal Government' and for 'monitoring economic trends ... related to the CPT [Current Procedures and Terminology] development process".

RUC is highly influential because it de facto sets Medicare valuations of physician work relative value units (RVUs) of Current Procedural Terminology (CPT) codes. (The Centers for Medicare and Medicaid Services (CMS) is the de jure work RVU determining body.) On average, physician work RVUs make up slightly more than half of the value in a Medicare payment. Historically, CMS has accepted RUC recommendations more than 90% of the time. Health economist Uwe Reinhardt characterized the CMS as slavishly accepting RUC recommendations. The physician work RVU values accepted by CMS also influence private health insurance reimbursement.

In 2002, a RUC update of values raised concerns that the process, which was initiated by medical speciality groups, unfairly cut primary care physician pay.

In a 2010 Archives of Internal Medicine publication written before the major health care reform legislation passed Congress—the Patient Protection and Affordable Care Act (PPACA)—Federman et al. wrote:

Physician dissatisfaction with Medicare reimbursements and concerns about equity of reimbursements suggest that the role of the RUC in advising Medicare should be carefully evaluated. The Obama administration and health policy experts have called for the creation of an independent Medicare advisory committee ... Without an independent arbiter, physicians and physician groups are likely to continue having complaints about the equitability of reimbursements under Medicare.

Critics have pointed out that many RUC members may have significant conflicts of interest because of their financial relationships.

In 2013, a report in The Washington Post highlighted how time seemed to bend in the system of time values assigned to various procedures. A Florida practice performing an average twelve colonoscopies and four other procedures a day in 2012 would be considered to take the physically impossible 26 hours in a nine- to 10-hour day. In other examples: In Florida and Pennsylvania surgery centers in some specialties, "more than one in five doctors would have to have been working more than 12 hours on average on a single day — much longer than the 10 hours or so a typical surgery center is open"; and "Florida records show 78 doctors — gastroenterologists, ophthalmologists, orthopedic surgeons and others — who performed at least 24 hours worth of procedures on an average workday". RUC chairperson Levy said in the report, "None of us believe the numbers are fine-tuned.... We do believe we get them right with respect to each other" while emphasizing that the "voting people around that table can be really harsh". Researcher Hsiao of the original Harvard study said the "current set of values 'seems to be distorted.... The AMA fought very hard to take over this updating process. I said this had to be done by an impartial group of people. This is highly political'". Looking at the time between 2003 and 2013, "the AMA and Medicare have increased the work values for 68 percent of the 5,700 codes analyzed by The Post, while decreasing them for only 10 percent" and while technology is argued, again with colonoscopies as an example, to be reducing actual time spent. Looked at another way, "Medicare spending on physician fees per patient grew 58 percent between 2001 and 2011, mostly because doctors increased the number of procedures performed but also because the price of those procedures rose". Finally, there was an indication in the report that the acceptance rate of the AMA's values by Medicare "has fallen in recent years from 90 percent [or higher] to about 70 percent" but the federal agency has far fewer people – "six to eight" – monitoring the process than the AMA has operating it.

The RUC bears the brunt of the inherent problems with regulation and government price-setting. In a follow-up to The Washington Post's report, Bloomberg notes: "There is no system of payment-setting that will not ultimately rely on information from self-interested parties, just as there is no system of financial regulation that can be designed without talking to bankers, or a system of education reform that can be put in place without asking teachers and principals how things work now."

The Independent Payment Advisory Board passed in the PPACA. It could bypass RUC to cut payments to relatively highly compensated specialists, such as dermatologists.

On February 9, 2018, the United States Congress voted to repeal the Independent Payment Advisory Board as a part of the Bipartisan Budget Act of 2018, by a vote of 71−28 in the US Senate and by a vote of 240−186 in US House of Representatives. Shortly thereafter that day, President Trump signed the budget bill into law, thereby repealing the IPAB.
