= William Hsiao =

American economist

William C. Hsiao (simplified Chinese: 萧庆伦; traditional Chinese: 蕭慶倫; pinyin: Xiāo Qìnglún; born January 17, 1936) is an American economist who is the K.T. Li Research Professor of Economics at the Harvard T.H. Chan School of Public Health in Boston, Massachusetts. He is internationally recognized for his work on health care financing and social insurance.

Hsiao is a graduate of Ohio Wesleyan University and received his PhD in economics from Harvard University. He is a member of the National Academy of Medicine, the Society of Actuaries, and the National Academy of Social Insurance.

He has received teaching awards from Harvard graduate students on several occasions. He resides in Cambridge, Massachusetts, with his wife, Ruth, a former lecturer at Tufts University. He has two sons and four grandchildren.

== Biography ==
Hsiao was born in Beijing, China, and as a teenager immigrated to the United States, where his father was an economic advisor for the Kuomintang delegation to the United Nations. He grew up in Forest Hills, Queens, and attended New York public schools. After graduating from college, Hsiao began his career as an actuary for Connecticut General Life Insurance Company, which was a predecessor to Cigna. Following this corporate stint, Hsiao moved to Washington, D.C., and was employed as an actuary to the Social Security Administration (SSA) in 1968. When the Chief Actuary of the SSA resigned, Hsiao was appointed the acting Chief Actuary in 1970.

During this time, the Social Security Administration was roiled by efforts by the United States Congress to reform the social security system and maintain its solvency. Hsiao headed up two blue-ribbon panels and testified several times before Congress regarding the actuarial viability of the system under the funding mechanisms in place. Eventually, in 1977, the Congress passed and President Jimmy Carter signed into law one of the most comprehensive legislative efforts to bolster the social security system.

Following this government service, Hsiao commenced studies at the Harvard University Institute of Government, which later became the John F. Kennedy School of Government. He then entered the Ph.D program in the Department of Economics at Harvard University. His doctoral thesis was advised by Martin Feldstein, who later was chair of the Council of Economic Advisors under President Ronald Reagan. Hsiao was appointed to the faculty of the Harvard School of Public Health as an assistant professor in 1979. He became a full professor in 1986. He was appointed to the K.T. Li chaired professorship in 1992, named for the Taiwanese policy-maker Kwoh-Ting Li.

== Work ==
Among his many contributions to the fields of health care economics, policy, and social insurance was a landmark study called the Resource-Based Relative Value Study or RBRVS which examined the United States system of reimbursing physicians for medical services. RBRVS led to a series of articles published in the New England Journal of Medicine, one of the first times the prestigious journal had devoted an entire issue to articles on one subject. RBRVS led to a revolutionary reordering of physician reimbursement payments under Medicare Part B which was passed by Congress and signed into law in 1989. However, RBRVS was never fully implemented, partially due to the American Medical Association-sponsored Specialty Society Relative Value Scale Update Committee.

Later, Hsiao conducted studies of the social insurance and medical payment systems of a vast array of foreign countries and regions, including Singapore, Cyprus, Taiwan, Canada, South Africa, the People's Republic of China, and Hong Kong (SAR of People's Republic of China). He is considered one of the world's foremost experts on health care economics and financing and regularly advises U.S. government agencies, foreign governments and non-governmental organizations such as the World Bank, UNICEF, and the World Health Organization.

Hsiao's recent studies include a demonstration project of a micro-health insurance plan in rural provinces in China. The program was highlighted in The Wall Street Journal. Hsiao was also brought on by the legislature of Vermont to outline three reforms for health care in the state, presenting a plan that eventually became the Green Mountain Care program in June 2010.
