= Relative value (economics) =

In finance, relative value is the attractiveness measured in terms of risk, liquidity, and return of one financial asset relative to another, or for a given instrument, of one maturity relative to another. The concept arises in economics, business and investment.

== In hedge funds ==
The use of relative value is a method of determining an asset's value that takes into account the value of similar assets. In contrast, absolute value looks only at an asset's intrinsic value and does not compare it to other assets. Calculations that are used to measure the relative value of stocks include the enterprise ratio and price-to-earnings ratio.

== Prices ==
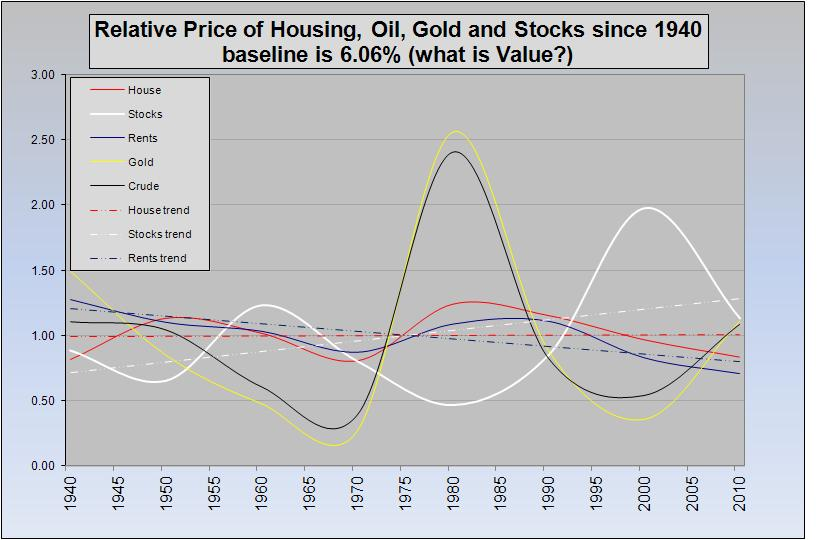
Value or Price

Prices of valued items undergo questionable fluctuations. For example, even though housing provides the same utility to the individual over time, and the housing stock is relatively constant or stable, the relative price of housing fluctuates. This holds even more so with company shares, oil and gold. This price fluctuation appears to occur in cycles and is caused by a myriad of factors.

The chart to the right is an attempt to overlay the prices of housing, stocks, oil and gold by normalizing the price streams. Normalizing is achieved by applying a discounting formula which converts a price to the price it would be at a certain date, given a certain discount rate. This would normally be used to cancel the effects of inflation, in which case the inflation rate would be used.

In this case the rate is derived as follows: A trend was calculated for the resulting discounted price curve using the method of "least squares". The discount rate was then derived by seeking the goal of a trend of 1, i.e. flat. For housing this normalization rate was 6.06% considering the data from 1940 to 2010 relative to the year 1990. Using this as a baseline rate, the normalized price curves were calculated for the other commodities. Oil and gold had similar normalization rates, but Stocks tended to beat this trend, while rents tended to lose against this trend in the period observed. Gold was the most volatile along with Oil in close second. Stocks were highly volatile. Housing and rents were the least volatile of the commodities studied.

== See also ==
- Resource-based relative value scale
- Valuation (finance)#Valuation overview
