= Usual, customary and reasonable =

Usual, customary, and reasonable (UCR) is an American method of generating health care prices, described as "more or less whatever doctors decided to charge". According to Steven Schroeder, Wilbur Cohen inserted UCR into the Social Security Act of 1965 "in an unsuccessful attempt to placate the American Medical Association". Health insurers determine what they deem to be "usual, customary and reasonable" and pay only a percentage of that.

Under an early version of this system based on Resource-Based Relative Value Units, physician services were largely considered to be misvalued, with evaluation and management services being undervalued and procedures overvalued. Third-party payers (public and private health insurance) advocated for an improved model instead of the UCR fees that led to "some egregious distortions". In the mid-1980s, U.S. health care "payments for doing procedures had far outstripped payments for diagnosis". For example, "doctors who spent an hour making a complex and lifesaving diagnosis were paid forty dollars; for spending an hour doing a colonoscopy and excising a polyp, they received more than six hundred dollars". Costs for cataract surgery, which could be as high as $6,000 in 1985, "grew to consume 4% of Medicare's budget". And despite technology that reduced the time required for the surgery by a factor of 4 to 6, costs did not decrease.

The US government healthcare website defines usual, customary and reasonable as being "The amount paid for a medical service in a geographic area based on what providers in the area usually charge for the same or similar medical service. The UCR amount sometimes is used to determine the allowed amount." Often it is used by insurance companies and plan administrators when participants go out of network for services where typically the maximum the plan will pay for a claim is based on the prevailing rates in the area or UCR. These statistics are available from private and commercial sources.

In the context of prescription costs, the Government Accountability Office has stated that "The U&C price is the price an individual without prescription drug coverage would pay at a retail pharmacy."

For dentists, the American Dental Association defines a usual and customary fee as "the fee an individual dentist most frequently charges for a specific dental procedure independent of any contractual agreement. It is always appropriate to modify the fee based on the nature and severity of the condition being treated and by any medical or dental complications or unusual circumstances."

== See also ==
- Resource-based relative value scale
