= Resource-based relative value scale =

Medical provider remuneration calculation

Resource-based relative value scale (RBRVS) is a schema used to determine how much money medical providers should be paid. It is partially used by Medicare in the United States and by nearly all health maintenance organizations (HMOs).

RBRVS assigns procedures performed by a physician or other medical provider a relative value which is adjusted by geographic region (so a procedure performed in Manhattan is worth more than a procedure performed in Dallas). This value is then multiplied by a fixed conversion factor, which changes annually, to determine the amount of payment.

RBRVS determines prices based on three separate factors: physician work (54%), practice expense (41%), and malpractice expense (5%).

The procedure codes and their associated RVUs are made publicly available by CMS as the Physician Fee Schedule.

== Example ==
For example, in 2005, a generic 99213 Current Procedural Terminology (CPT) code was worth 1.39 Relative Value Units, or RVUs. Adjusted for North Jersey, it was worth 1.57 RVUs. Using the 2005 Conversion Factor of $37.90, Medicare paid 1.57 * $37.90 for each 99213 performed, or $59.50. Most specialties charge 200–400% of Medicare rates for their procedures and collect between 50 and 80% of those charges, after contractual adjustments and write-offs.

== Criticism ==
The RBRVS system has been criticized on a number of grounds:

- Paying based on effort rather than effect skews incentives, leading to overuse of complicated procedures without consideration for outcomes. Contrast with Payment by Results (PbR), which is based on outcomes.
  According to this critique, RBRVS misaligns incentives: because the medical value to the patient of a service is not included in how much is paid for the service, there is no financial incentive to help the patient, nor to minimize costs. Rather, payment is partly based on difficulty of the service (the "physician work" component), and thus a profit-maximizing physician is incentivized to provide maximally complicated services, with no consideration for effectiveness.
  One effect attributed to RBRVS is a lack of primary care physicians (PCPs) at the expense of specialists – because specialist services require more effort and specialized training, they are paid more highly, incentivizing physicians to specialize, leading to a lack of PCPs.
- The Specialty Society Relative Value Scale Update Committee (RUC) is largely privately run, an example of regulatory capture.
- RUC meetings can be attended by submitting a request in advance.
- The data are effectively copyrighted by the AMA, but its use is required by statute.
  Although the RBRVS system is mandated by the Centers for Medicare and Medicaid Services (CMS) and the data for it appears in the Federal Register, the American Medical Association (AMA) maintains that their copyright of the CPT allows them to charge a license fee to anyone who wishes to associate RVU values with CPT codes. The AMA receives approximately $70 million annually from these fees, making them reluctant to allow the free distribution of tools and data that might help physicians calculate their fees accurately and fairly.

== History ==
RBRVS was created at Harvard University in their national RBRVS study from December 1985 and published in JAMA on September 29, 1988. William Hsiao was the principal investigator who organized a multi-disciplinary team of researchers, which included statisticians, physicians, economists and measurement specialists, to develop the RBRVS.

In 1988 the results were submitted to the Health Care Financing Administration (today CMS) to be used in the American Medicare system. In December of the following year, President George H. W. Bush signed into law the Omnibus Budget Reconciliation Act of 1989, switching Medicare to an RBRVS payment schedule. This took effect on January 1, 1992. Starting in 1991, the AMA has updated RBRVS continually. As of May 2003, over 3500 corrections have been submitted to CMS.

== Procedure ==
=== Committees ===
Physicians bill their services using procedure codes developed by a seventeen-member committee known as the CPT Editorial Panel. The AMA nominates eleven of the members while the remaining seats are nominated by the Blue Cross and Blue Shield Association, the Health Insurance Association of America, CMS, and the American Hospital Association. The CPT Committee issues new codes twice each year.

A separate committee, the Specialty Society Relative Value Scale Update Committee (RUC), meets three times a year to set new values, determines the Relative Value Units (RVUs) for each new code, and revalues all existing codes at least once every five years. The RUC has 29 members, 23 of whom are appointed by major national medical societies. The six remaining seats are held by the Chair (an AMA appointee), an AMA representative, a representative from the CPT Editorial Panel, a representative from the American Osteopathic Association, a representative from the Health Care Professions Advisory Committee and a representative from the Practice Expense Review Committee. Anyone who attends its meetings must sign a confidentiality agreement.

=== Price setting ===
The RBRVS for each CPT code is determined using three separate factors: physician work, practice expense, and malpractice expense. The average relative weights of these are: physician work (52%), practice expense (44%), malpractice expense (4%). A method to determine the physician work value was the primary contribution made by the Hsiao study. The RUC examines each new code to determine a relative value by comparing the physician work of the new code to the physician work involved in existing codes.

The practice expense, determined by the Practice Expense Review Committee, consists of the direct expenses related to supplies and non-physician labor used in providing the service, and the pro rata cost of the equipment used. In addition, there is an amount included for the indirect expenses.

In the development of the RBRVS, the physician work (including the physician's time, mental effort, technical skill, judgment, stress and an amortization of the physician's education), the practice expense and the malpractice expense are factored into the result. The calculation of the fee includes a geographic adjustment. The RBRVS does not include adjustments for outcomes, quality of service, severity, or demand.

== See also ==
- Medicare Sustainable Growth Rate
- Evaluation and Management Coding
- Quality-adjusted life year
