= Current Procedural Terminology =

Procedural classification used in the United States

- Abbreviation: CPT
- Status: Published
- Latest version: CPT 2021; October 2021
- Organization: American Medical Association
- Editors: CPT Editorial Panel
- Domain: Medical classification
- Website: www.ama-assn.org/amaone/cpt-current-procedural-terminology

The Current Procedural Terminology (CPT) code set is a procedural code set developed by the American Medical Association (AMA). It is maintained by the CPT Editorial Panel. The CPT code set describes medical, surgical, and diagnostic services and is designed to communicate uniform information about medical services and procedures among physicians, coders, patients, accreditation organizations, and payers for administrative, financial, and analytical purposes. New editions are released each October, with CPT 2021 being in use since October 2021. It is available in both a standard edition and a professional edition.

CPT coding is similar to ICD-10-CM coding, except that it identifies the services rendered, rather than the diagnosis on the claim. Whilst the ICD-10-PCS codes also contains procedure codes, those are only used in the inpatient setting.

CPT is identified by the Centers for Medicare and Medicaid Services (CMS) as Level 1 of the Healthcare Common Procedure Coding System (HCPCS). Although its use has become federally regulated, the CPT's copyright has not entered the public domain. Users of the CPT code set must pay license fees to the AMA.

== History ==
As the AMA decided in April 1960, the Current Medical Terminology (CMT) handbook was first published in June 1962 – 1963 to standardize terminology of the Standard Nomenclature of Diseases and Operations (SNDO) and International Classification of Diseases (ICD), and for the analysis of patient records, and was aided by an IBM computer. Procedural information was dropped in the transition from the SNDO to CMT, but was released separately as the Current Procedural Terminology in 1966.

The CPT code revisions in 2013 were part of a periodic five-year review of codes. Some psychotherapy codes changed numbers, for example 90806 changed to 90834 for individual psychotherapy of a similar duration. Add-on codes were created for the complexity of communication about procedures. Family therapy and psychological testing codes were among those that were unchanged.

== Types of code ==
There are three types of CPT code: Category I, Category II, and Category III.

=== Category I ===
Category I CPT Code(s). There are six main sections:

==== Medicare specific codes (HCPCS) for Preventive evaluation and management ====
- (G0402) - Initial Preventive Physical Examination; face-to-face visit, services limited to a new patient during the first 12 months of Medicare enrollment.
- (G0438) - Annual wellness visit, includes a personalized prevention plan of service (PPPS), first visit,
- (G0439) - Annual wellness visit, includes a personalized prevention plan of service (PPPS), subsequent visit

==== Codes for evaluation and management: 99201–99499 ====
- (99201–99215) Office/other outpatient services
- (99217–99220) Hospital observation services
- (99221–99239) Hospital inpatient services
- (99241–99255) Consultations
- (99281–99288) Emergency department services
- (99291–99292) Critical care services
- (99304–99318) Nursing facility services
- (99324–99337) Domiciliary, rest home (boarding home) or custodial care services
- (99339–99340) Domiciliary, rest home (assisted living facility), or home care plan oversight services
- (99341–99350) Home health services
- (99354–99360) Prolonged services
- (99363–99368) Case management services
- (99374–99380) Care plan oversight services
- (99381–99429) Preventive medicine services
- (99441–99444) Non-face-to-face physician services
- (99450–99456) Special evaluation and management services
- (99460–99465) Newborn care services
- (99466–99480) Inpatient neonatal intensive, and pediatric/neonatal critical, care services
- (99487–99489) Complex chronic care coordination services
- (99495–99496) Transitional care management services
- (99499) Other evaluation and management services

==== Codes for anesthesia: 00100–01999; 99100–99150 ====
- (00100–00222) head
- (00300–00352) neck
- (00400–00474) thorax
- (00500–00580) intrathoracic
- (00600–00670) spine and spinal cord
- (00700–00797) upper abdomen
- (00800–00882) lower abdomen
- (00902–00952) perineum
- (01112–01190) pelvis (except hip)
- (01200–01274) upper leg (except knee)
- (01320–01444) knee and popliteal area
- (01462–01522) lower leg (below knee)
- (01610–01682) shoulder and axillary
- (01710–01782) upper arm and elbow
- (01810–01860) forearm, wrist and hand
- (01916–01936) radiological procedures
- (01951–01953) burn excisions or debridement
- (01958–01969) obstetric
- (01990–01999) other procedures
- (99100–99140) qualifying circumstances for anesthesia
- (99143–99150) moderate (conscious) sedation

==== Codes for surgery: 10000–69990 ====
- (10000–10022) general
- (10040–19499) integumentary system
- (20000–29999) musculoskeletal system
- (30000–32999) respiratory system
- (33010–37799) cardiovascular system
- (38100–38999) hemic and lymphatic systems
- (39000–39599) mediastinum and diaphragm
- (40490–49999) digestive system
- (50010–53899) urinary system
- (54000–55899) male genital system
- (55920–55980) reproductive system and intersex
- (56405–58999) female genital system
- (59000–59899) maternity care and delivery
- (60000–60699) endocrine system
- (61000–64999) nervous system
- (65091–68899) eye and ocular adnexa
- (69000–69979) auditory system

==== Codes for radiology: 70000–79999 ====
- (70010–76499) diagnostic radiology
- (76500–76999) diagnostic ultrasound
- (77001–77032) radiologic guidance
- (77051–77059) breast mammography
- (77071–77084) bone/joint studies
- (77261–77999) radiation oncology
- (78000–79999) nuclear medicine

==== Codes for pathology and laboratory: 80000–89398 ====
- (80000–80076) organ or disease-oriented panels
- (80100–80103) drug testing
- (80150–80299) therapeutic drug assays
- (80400–80440) evocative/suppression testing
- (80500–80502) consultations (clinical pathology)
- (81000–81099) urinalysis
- (82000–84999) chemistry
- (85002–85999) hematology and coagulation
- (86000–86849) immunology
- (86850–86999) transfusion medicine
- (87001–87999) microbiology
- (88000–88099) anatomic pathology (postmortem)
- (88104–88199) cytopathology
- (88230–88299) cytogenetic studies
- (88300–88399) surgical pathology
- (88720–88741) in vivo (transcutaneous) lab procedures
- (89049–89240) other procedures
- (89250–89398) reproductive medicine procedures

==== Codes for medicine: 90281–99099; 99151–99199; 99500–99607 ====
- (90281–90399) immune globulins, serum or recombinant prods
- (90465–90474) immunization administration for vaccines/toxoids
- (90476–90749) vaccines, toxoids
- (90801–90899) psychiatry
- (90901–90911) biofeedback
- (90935–90999) dialysis
- (91000–91299) gastroenterology
- (92002–92499) ophthalmology
- (92502–92700) special otorhinolaryngologic services
- (92950–93799) cardiovascular
- (93875–93990) noninvasive vascular diagnostic studies
- (94002–94799) pulmonary
- (95004–95199) allergy and clinical immunology
- (95250–95251) endocrinology
- (95803–96020) neurology and neuromuscular procedures
- (96101–96125) central nervous system assessments/tests (neuro-cognitive, mental status, speech testing)
- (96150–96155) health and behavior assessment/intervention
- (96360–96549) hydration, therapeutic, prophylactic, diagnostic injections and infusions, and chemotherapy and other highly complex drug or highly complex biologic agent administration
- (96567–96571) photodynamic therapy
- (96900–96999) special dermatological procedures
- (97001–97799) physical medicine and rehabilitation
- (97802–97804) medical nutrition therapy
- (97810–97814) acupuncture
- (98925–98929) osteopathic manipulative treatment
- (98940–98943) chiropractic manipulative treatment
- (98960–98962) education and training for patient self-management
- (98966–98969) non-face-to-face nonphysician services
- (99000–99091) special services, procedures and reports
- (99170–99199) other services and procedures
- (99500–99602) home health procedures/services

=== Category II ===
CPT II codes describe clinical components usually included in evaluation and management of clinical services and are not associated with any relative value. Category II codes are reviewed by the Performance Measures Advisory Group (PMAG), an advisory body to the CPT Editorial Panel and the CPT/HCPAC Advisory Committee. The PMAG is composed of performance measurement experts representing the Agency for Healthcare Research and Quality (AHRQ), the American Medical Association (AMA), the Centers for Medicare and Medicaid Services (CMS), the Joint Commission on Accreditation of Healthcare Organizations (JCAHO), the National Committee for Quality Assurance (NCQA) and the Physician Consortium for Performance Improvement. The PMAG may seek additional expertise and/or input from other national health care organizations, as necessary, for the development of Category II codes. These may include national medical specialty societies, other national health care professional associations, accrediting bodies and federal regulatory agencies.

Category II codes make use of an alphabetical character as the 5th character in the string (i.e., 4 digits followed by the letter F). These digits are not intended to reflect the placement of the code in the regular (Category I) part of the CPT codebook. Appendix H in CPT section contains information about performance measurement exclusion of modifiers, measures, and the measures' source(s). Currently there are 11 Category II codes. They are:

- (0001F–0015F) Composite measures
- (0500F–0584F) Patient management
- (1000F–1505F) Patient history
- (2000F–2060F) Physical examination
- (3006F–3776F) Diagnostic/screening processes or results
- (4000F–4563F) Therapeutic, preventive or other interventions
- (5005F–5250F) Follow-up or other outcomes
- (6005F–6150F) Patient safety
- (7010F–7025F) Structural measures
- (9001F–9007F) Non-measure claims-based reporting

CPT II codes are billed in the procedure code field, just as CPT Category I codes are billed. Because CPT II codes are not associated with any relative value, they are billed with a $0.00 billable charge amount.

=== Category III ===
- Category III CPT Code(s) – Emerging technology (Category III codes: 0016T-0207T)

== Criticism of copyright ==
CPT is a registered trademark of the American Medical Association (AMA) and its largest single source of income. The AMA holds the copyright for the CPT coding system. However, in Practice Management v. American Medical Association the U.S. Court of Appeals for the Ninth Circuit held that while the AMA owned the copyright, it could not enjoin a competitor on the basis that the AMA had misused its copyright. Practice Management had argued that the publication of the CPT into federal regulation invalidated the copyright; the general debate around copyright and regulation access was revived in 2012 by a petition motivated by an Administrative Conference of the United States recommendation.

In 2001, Senate Minority Leader Trent Lott criticized what he labeled as the AMA's "monopoly" over the CPT codes for preventing "comparison shopping" by patients and for contributing to rising healthcare costs.

Despite the copyrighted nature of the CPT code sets, the use of the code is mandated by almost all health insurance payment and information systems, including the Centers for Medicare and Medicaid Services (CMS), and the data for the code sets appears in the Federal Register. It is necessary for most users of the CPT code (principally providers of services) to pay license fees for access to the code.

In the past, AMA offered a limited search of the CPT manual for personal, non-commercial use on its website. CPT codes can be looked up on the AAPC (American Academy of Professional Coders) website.

== See also ==
- Medical classification
- Procedure code
- ICD-10
- ICD-10-PCS
- HCPCS
- Specialty Society Relative Value Scale Update Committee
