= Health insurance in the United States =

In the United States, health insurance helps pay for medical expenses through privately purchased insurance, social insurance, or a social welfare program funded by the government. Synonyms for this usage include health coverage, health care coverage, and health benefits.

In a more technical sense, the term "health insurance" is used to describe any form of insurance providing protection against the costs of medical services. This usage includes both private insurance programs and social insurance programs such as Medicare, which pools resources and spreads the financial risk associated with major medical expenses across the entire population to protect everyone, as well as social welfare programs like Medicaid and the Children's Health Insurance Program, which both provide assistance to people who cannot afford health coverage.

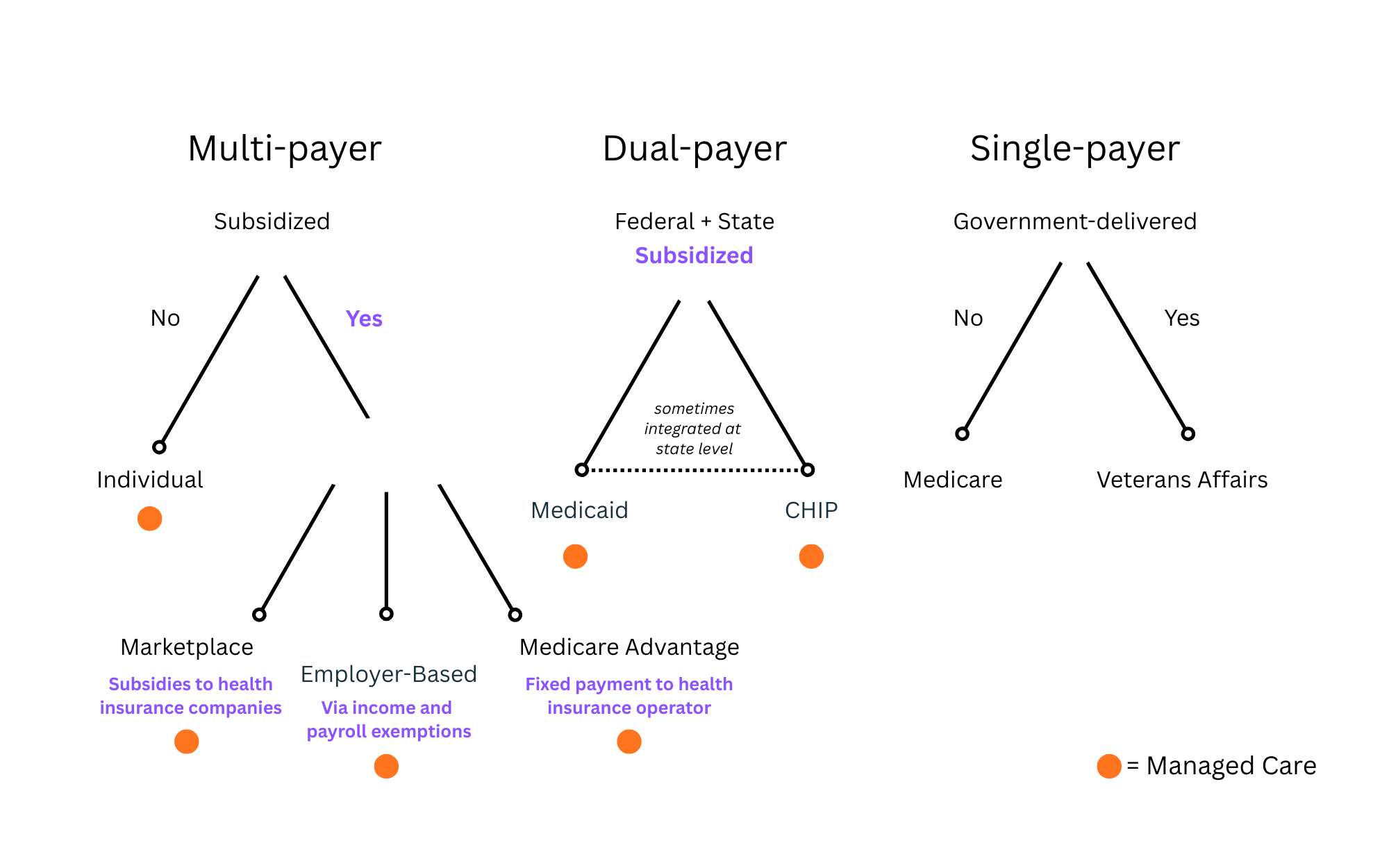
There is no uniform system of health insurance in the United States. Systems vary in who pays for health insurance, who provides health care, and where patients can go for covered care.

In addition to medical expense insurance, "health insurance" may also refer to insurance covering disability or long-term nursing or custodial care needs. Different health insurance provides different levels of financial protection and the scope of coverage can vary widely, with more than 40% of insured individuals reporting that their plans do not adequately meet their needs as of 2007.

Major federal regulatory reforms, such as the enactment of Medicare and Medicaid in 1965 and the Affordable Care Act in 2010, have substantially reduced the number of uninsured Americans. In American politics, the Democratic Party tends to support public expansions in health insurance coverage while the Republican Party opposes it, with Republicans opposing Medicaid Expansion and supporting Affordable Care Act repeal. In 2023, it has been reported that approximately 25.3 million non-elderly Americans lacked health insurance, a decrease compared to 2019.

The United States spends vastly more on health care than comparable countries, which has been attributed in large part to inefficiencies and anti-competitive practices in its health insurance system. Commercial insurance in the US charges prices that are approximately 2.5 times the prices paid by those with public insurance.

== Enrollment and the uninsured ==
Gallup issued a report in July 2014 stating that the uninsured rate for adults 18 and over declined from 18% in 2013 to 13.4% by 2014, largely because there were new coverage options and market reforms under the Affordable Care Act. Rand Corporation had similar findings.

=== Trends in private coverage ===
The proportion of non-elderly individuals with employer-sponsored cover fell from 66% in 2000 to 56% in 2010, then stabilized following the passage of the Affordable Care Act. Employees who worked part-time (less than 30 hours a week) were less likely to be offered coverage by their employer than were employees who worked full-time (21% vs. 72%).

A major trend in employer sponsored coverage has been increasing premiums, deductibles, and co-payments for medical services, and increasing the costs of using out-of-network health providers rather than in-network providers. Private exchanges allow some selection of benefit plans, funded by their employer. Some employers use defined contribution health benefits, where the responsibility is on the employee to find a scheme, but then the employer contributes.

=== Trends in public coverage ===
Public insurance cover increased from 2000 to 2010 in part because of an aging population and an economic downturn in the latter part of the decade. Funding for Medicaid and CHIP expanded significantly under the 2010 health reform bill. The proportion of individuals covered by Medicaid increased from 10.5% in 2000 to 14.5% in 2010 and 20% in 2015. The proportion covered by Medicare increased from 13.5% in 2000 to 15.9% in 2010, then decreased to 14% in 2015.

According to the Center for Medicare & Medicaid Services(CMS), as of January 15, 2025, 24.2 million users selected a plan for public coverage or were automatically re-enrolled in public health coverage.

=== Status of the uninsured ===
The uninsured proportion was stable at 14–15% from 1990 to 2008, then rose to a peak of 18% in Q3 2013 and rapidly fell to 11% in 2015. The percent of the population without insurance remained close to 9% through 2025.

A 2011 study found that there were 2.1 million hospital stays for uninsured patients, accounting for 4.4% ($17.1 billion) of total aggregate inpatient hospital costs in the United States. The costs of treating the uninsured must often be absorbed by providers as charity care, passed on to the insured via cost-shifting and higher health insurance premiums, or paid by taxpayers through higher taxes.

=== The social safety net ===
The social safety net refers to those providers that organize and deliver a significant level of health care and other needed services to the uninsured, Medicaid, and other vulnerable patients. This is important given that the uninsured rate for Americans is still high after the advent of the Affordable Care Act, with a rate of 10.9%, or 28.9 million people in 2019. Not only is this because the ACA does not address gaps for undocumented or homeless populations, but higher insurance premiums, political factors, failure to expand Medicaid in some states, and ineligibility for financial assistance for coverage are just some of the reasons that the social safety net is required for the uninsured. Most people who are uninsured are non-elderly adults in working families, low income families, and minorities. Social safety net hospitals primarily provide services to these populations of uninsured. For example, California's Public Health Care Systems are only 6% of the hospitals in the state, yet provide care for 38% of all hospital care of uninsured in California- 123,000 of which are homeless, and 3.6 million of which live below the federal poverty line.

One way in which the US has been addressing this need for a social safety net (other than formally/state recognized safety net hospitals) is through the advent of free clinics, an example of a Federally Qualified Health Center. A free clinic (for example, the Haight Ashbury Free Clinic and the Berkeley Free Clinic) is a clinic that provides services for free and target the uninsured, typically relying on volunteers and lay health workers.

==== Death ====
Since people who lack health insurance are unable to obtain timely medical care, they have a 40% higher risk of death in any given year than those with health insurance, according to a study published in the American Journal of Public Health. The study estimated that in 2005 in the United States, there were 45,000 deaths associated with lack of health insurance. A 2008 systematic review found consistent evidence that health insurance increased utilization of services and improved health.

Uninsured patients share their experience with the health care system in the United States.

A study at Johns Hopkins Hospital found that heart transplant complications occurred most often amongst the uninsured, and that patients who had private health plans fared better than those covered by Medicaid or Medicare.

==== Reform ====
The Affordable Care Act of 2010 was designed primarily to extend health coverage to those without it by expanding Medicaid, creating financial incentives for employers to offer coverage, and requiring those without employer or public coverage to purchase insurance in newly created health insurance exchanges. This requirement for almost all individuals to maintain health insurance is often referred to as the individual mandate. The Congressional Budget Office (CBO) has estimated that roughly 33 million who would have otherwise been uninsured will receive coverage because of the act by 2022.

Repeal of the Individual Mandate

The Tax Cuts and Jobs Act of 2017 effectively repealed the individual mandate, meaning that individuals will no longer be penalized for failing to maintain health coverage starting in 2019. The CBO projects that this change will result in four million more uninsured by 2019, 13 million more by 2027.

=== Underinsurance ===
Those who are insured may be underinsured such that they cannot afford full medical care, for example due to the exclusion of pre-existing conditions, or from high deductibles or co-payments. In 2019 Gallup found while only 11% reported being uninsured, 25% of U.S. adults said they or a family member had delayed treatment for a serious medical condition during the year because of cost, up from 12% in 2003 and 19% in 2015. For any condition, 33% reported delaying treatment, up from 24% in 2003 and 31% in 2015.

== History ==
The first health coverage in the United States was established by Congress in 1798, when the Marine Hospital Fund was financed through a tax on maritime sailors' pay. Accident insurance was first offered in the United States by the Franklin Health Assurance Company of Massachusetts. This firm, founded in 1850, offered insurance against injuries arising from railroad and steamboat accidents. Sixty organizations were offering accident insurance in the US by 1866, but the industry consolidated rapidly soon thereafter. While there were earlier experiments, sickness coverage in the US effectively dates from 1890. The first employer-sponsored group disability policy was issued in 1911, but this plan's primary purpose was replacing wages lost because the worker was unable to work, not medical expenses.

Before the development of medical expense insurance, patients were expected to pay all other health care costs out of their own pockets, under what is known as the fee-for-service business model. During the middle to late 20th century, traditional disability insurance evolved into modern health insurance programs. Today, most comprehensive private health insurance programs cover the cost of routine, preventive, and emergency health care procedures, and also most prescription drugs, but this was not always the case. The rise of private insurance was accompanied by the gradual expansion of public insurance programs for those who could not acquire coverage through the market.

Hospital and medical expense policies were introduced during the first half of the 20th century. During the 1920s, individual hospitals began offering services to individuals on a pre-paid basis, eventually leading to the development of Blue Cross organizations in the 1930s. The first employer-sponsored hospitalization plan was created by teachers in Dallas, Texas, in 1929. Because the plan only covered members' expenses at a single hospital (Baylor Hospital), it is also the forerunner of today's health maintenance organizations (HMOs).

In 1935, the Roosevelt Administration decided not to include a large-scale health insurance program as part of the new Social Security program. The problem was not an attack by any organized opposition, such as the opposition from the American Medical Association (AMA) that later derailed Truman's proposals in 1949. Instead, there was a lack of active popular, congressional, or interest group support. Roosevelt's strategy was to wait for a demand and a program to materialize and then, if he thought it popular enough, throw his support behind it. His Committee on Economic Security (CES) deliberately limited the health segment of Social Security to the expansion of medical care and facilities. It considered unemployment insurance to be the major priority. Roosevelt assured the medical community that medicine would be kept out of politics. Jaap Kooijman says he succeeded in "pacifying the opponents without discouraging the reformers." The right moment never came for him to reintroduce the topic.

In 1942, following its mandate to control inflation, the National War Labor Board partially denied an increase in wages to the unions of the four "Little Steel" companies. This established the Little Steel formula. Under the formula, non-wage fringe benefits, like health insurance, were exempt from price controls. The result was that unions demanding increased compensation and employers competing for labor increasingly turned to non-controlled fringe benefits, like paid sick time and health insurance, as a primary compensation for labor. By the end of the war, the number of employer-provided health insurance programs had tripled.

Recent research highlights how the AMA's 1940s campaign against national health insurance, emphasizing private insurance as a symbol of freedom, shaped today's costly US healthcare system dominated by powerful medical lobbies.

=== The rise of employer-sponsored coverage ===
Some of the first evidence of compulsory health insurance in the United States was in 1915, through the progressive reform protecting workers against medical costs and sicknesses in industrial America. Prior to this, within the Socialist and Progressive parties, health insurance and coverage was framed as not only an economic right for workers' health, but also as an employer's responsibility and liability—healthcare was in this context centered on working-class Americans and labor unions.

Employer-sponsored health insurance plans dramatically expanded as a direct result of wage controls imposed by the federal government during World War II. The labor market was tight because of the increased demand for goods and decreased supply of workers during the war. Federally imposed wage and price controls prohibited manufacturers and other employers from raising wages enough to attract workers. When the War Labor Board declared that fringe benefits, such as sick leave and health insurance, did not count as wages for the purpose of wage controls, employers responded with significantly increased offers of fringe benefits, especially health care coverage, to attract workers. The tax deduction was later codified in the Revenue Act of 1954.

President Harry S. Truman proposed a system of public health insurance in his November 19, 1945, address. He envisioned a national system that would be open to all Americans, but would remain optional. Participants would pay monthly fees into the plan, which would cover the cost of any and all medical expenses that arose in a time of need. The government would pay for the cost of services rendered by any doctor who chose to join the program. In addition, the insurance plan would give cash to the policy holder to replace wages lost because of illness or injury. The proposal was quite popular with the public, but it was fiercely opposed by the Chamber of Commerce, the American Hospital Association, and the AMA, which denounced it as "socialism".

Foreseeing a long and costly political battle, many labor unions chose to campaign for employer-sponsored coverage, which they saw as a less desirable but more achievable goal, and as coverage expanded, the national insurance system lost political momentum and ultimately failed to pass. Using health care and other fringe benefits to attract the best employees, private sector, white-collar employers nationwide expanded the U.S. health care system. Public sector employers followed suit in an effort to compete. Between 1940 and 1960, the total number of people enrolled in health insurance plans grew seven-fold, from 20,662,000 to 142,334,000, and by 1958, 75% of Americans had some form of health coverage. By 1976 85.9% of the employed population 17–64 years of age had hospital insurance while 84.2% had surgical insurance.

=== Kerr–Mills Act ===
Still, private insurance remained unaffordable or simply unavailable to many, including the poor, the unemployed, and the elderly. Before 1965, only half of seniors had health care coverage, and they paid three times as much as younger adults, while having lower incomes. Consequently, interest persisted in creating public health insurance for those left out of the private marketplace.

The 1960 Kerr–Mills Act provided matching funds to states assisting patients with their medical bills. In the early 1960s, Congress rejected a plan to subsidize private coverage for people with Social Security as unworkable, and an amendment to the Social Security Act creating a publicly run alternative was proposed. Finally, President Lyndon B. Johnson signed the Medicare and Medicaid programs into law in 1965, creating publicly run insurance for the elderly and the poor. Medicare was later expanded to cover people with disabilities, end-stage renal disease, and ALS.

=== State risk pools ===
Prior to the Patient Protection and Affordable Care Act, effective from 2014, about 34 states offered guaranteed-issuance risk pools, which enabled individuals who are medically uninsurable through private health insurance to purchase a state-sponsored health insurance plan, usually at higher cost, with high deductibles and possibly lifetime maximums. Plans varied greatly from state to state, both in their costs and benefits to consumers and in their methods of funding and operations. The first such plan was implemented In 1976.

Efforts to pass a national pool were unsuccessful for many years. With the Patient Protection and Affordable Care Act, it became easier for people with pre-existing conditions to afford regular insurance, since all insurers are fully prohibited from discriminating against or charging higher rates for any individuals based on pre-existing medical conditions. Therefore, most of the state-based pools shut down. As of 2017, some remain due to statutes which have not been updated, but they also may cover people with gaps in coverage such as undocumented immigrants or Medicare-eligible individuals under the age of 65.

=== Towards universal coverage ===
Persistent lack of insurance among many working Americans continued to create pressure for a comprehensive national health insurance system. In the early 1970s, there was fierce debate between two alternative models for universal coverage. Senator Ted Kennedy proposed a universal single-payer system, while President Nixon countered with his own proposal based on mandates and incentives for employers to provide coverage while expanding publicly run coverage for low-wage workers and the unemployed. Compromise was never reached, and Nixon's resignation and a series of economic problems later in the decade diverted Congress's attention away from health reform.

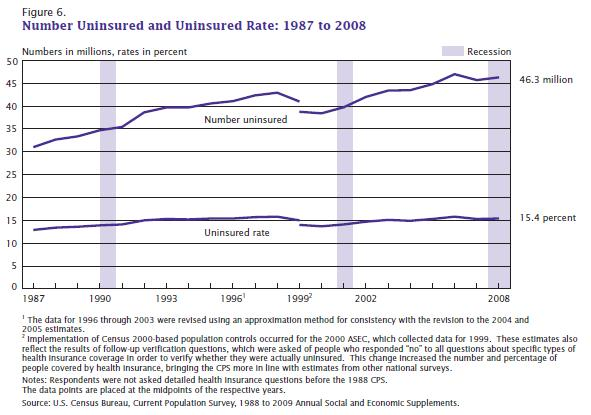
The numbers of uninsured Americans and the uninsured rate from 1987 to 2008

Shortly after his inauguration, President Clinton offered a new proposal for a universal health insurance system. Like Nixon's plan, Clinton's relied on mandates, both for individuals and for insurers, along with subsidies for people who could not afford insurance. The bill would have also created "health-purchasing alliances" to pool risk among multiple businesses and large groups of individuals. The plan was staunchly opposed by the insurance industry and employers' groups and received only mild support from liberal groups, particularly unions, which preferred a single-payer system. Ultimately it failed after the Republican takeover of Congress in 1994.

Finally achieving universal health coverage remained a top priority among Democrats, and passing a health reform bill was one of the Obama Administration's top priorities. The Patient Protection and Affordable Care Act was similar to the Nixon and Clinton plans, mandating coverage, penalizing employers who failed to provide it, and creating mechanisms for people to pool risk and buy insurance collectively. Earlier versions of the bill included a publicly run insurer that could compete to cover those without employer sponsored coverage (the so-called public option), but this was ultimately stripped to secure the support of moderates. The bill passed the Senate in December 2009 with all Democrats voting in favor and the House in March 2010 with the support of most Democrats. No Republicans voted in favor of it either time.

By the time the ACA was fully implemented in 2014, the US population had experienced dramatic coverage gains: nearly 20 million more people had coverage by 2016, with the uninsured rate falling to 10.0%. In 2017, President Trump and reduced the penalty for not purchasing insurance to $0. By eliminating the penalty, the President effectively eliminated the individual mandate. From 2016 to 2019, the uninsured rate increased by 1.7 percentage points.

Medicaid's continuous enrollment protections and enhanced ACA market subsidies during the pandemic reduced the uninsured rate in the US to record lows. The uninsured rate reached an all-time low of 7.9% in 2023, with tax credits cutting average annual expenses by $800. Once these Medicaid protections expired, more than 25 million people had their Medicaid coverage terminated over an 18 month period. Only record growth in ACA marketplace enrollment offset the losses.

== State and federal regulation ==
Historically, health insurance has been regulated by the states, consistent with the McCarran–Ferguson Act. Details for what health insurance could be sold were up to the states, with a variety of laws and regulations. Model acts and regulations promulgated by the National Association of Insurance Commissioners (NAIC) provide some degree of uniformity state to state. These models do not have the force of law and have no effect unless they are adopted by a state. They are, however, used as guides by most states, and some states adopt them with little or no change.

However, with the Patient Protection and Affordable Care Act, effective since 2014, federal laws have created some uniformity in partnership with the existing state-based system. Insurers are prohibited from discriminating against or charging higher rates for individuals based on pre-existing medical conditions and must offer a standard set of coverage.

=== California ===
In 2007, 87% of Californians had some form of health insurance. Services in California range from private offerings: HMOs, PPOs to public programs: Medi-Cal, Medicare, and Healthy Families (SCHIP). Insurers can pay providers a capitation only in the case of HMOs.

California's Office of the Patient Advocate was established July 2000 to publish a yearly Health Care Quality Report Card on the top HMOs, PPOs, and medical groups and to create and distribute helpful tips. The Office of the Patient Advocate's mission is "to improve California health care quality and advocate for consumer interests by publicly reporting data for informed decision making".

Additionally, California's Help Center assists Californians with problems with their health insurance. The Help Center is run by the Department of Managed Health Care, the government department that oversees and regulates HMOs and some PPOs.

In 2024, California became the first U.S. state to offer health insurance to all undocumented immigrants.

=== Massachusetts ===
The state passed healthcare reform in 2006 in order to decrease the uninsured rate among its citizens. The federal Affordable Care Act, colloquially known as "Obamacare", is largely based on Massachusetts' health reform. Due to that colloquialism, the Massachusetts reform has been nicknamed "Romneycare" after then-Governor Mitt Romney.

== Industry organizations ==
Industry organizations of several types such as the American Medical Association, the American Hospital Association, AHIP and the Blue Cross Blue Shield Association play a prominent role in lobbying surrounding the regulation of the health insurance market.

The complexity of the health care and insurance markets has led a number of these organizations to play a role in credentialing professionals who work in various sectors of the health insurance market process. Examples include AHIP's credentials for employees of insurance companies and those who sell insurance, the American Medical Billing Association's certification for medical reimbursement specialists and the Healthcare Financial Management Association's certification of hospital cost report specialists and revenue cycle executives.

== Public health care coverage ==
Public programs provide the primary source of coverage for most seniors and also low-income children and families who meet certain eligibility requirements. The primary public programs are Medicare, a federal social insurance program for seniors (generally persons aged 65 and over) and certain disabled individuals; Medicaid, funded jointly by the federal government and states but administered at the state level, which covers certain very low income children and their families; and Children's Health Insurance Program (CHIP), also a federal-state partnership that serves certain children and families who do not qualify for Medicaid but who cannot afford private coverage. Other public programs include military health benefits provided through TRICARE and the Veterans Health Administration and benefits provided through the Indian Health Service. Some states have additional programs for low-income individuals. In 2011, approximately 60 percent of stays were billed to Medicare and Medicaid—up from 52 percent in 1997.

=== Medicare ===
Medicare plans include the government plan and the privately run Medicare Advantage plan. Medicare Advantage bundles certain features from the government plan.

In the United States, Medicare is a federal social insurance program that provides health insurance to people over the age of 65, individuals who become totally and permanently disabled, end stage renal disease (ESRD) patients, and people with ALS. Recent research has found that the health trends of previously uninsured adults, especially those with chronic health problems, improves once they enter the Medicare program. Traditional Medicare requires considerable cost-sharing, but ninety percent of Medicare enrollees have some kind of supplemental insurance—either employer-sponsored or retiree coverage, Medicaid, or a private Medigap plan—that covers some or all of their cost-sharing. With supplemental insurance, Medicare ensures that its enrollees have predictable, affordable health care costs regardless of unforeseen illness or injury.

As the population covered by Medicare grows, its costs are projected to rise from slightly over 3 percent of GDP to over 6 percent, contributing substantially to the federal budget deficit. In 2011, Medicare was the primary payer for an estimated 15.3 million inpatient stays, representing 47.2 percent ($182.7 billion) of total aggregate inpatient hospital costs in the United States. The Affordable Care Act took some steps to reduce Medicare spending, and various other proposals are circulating to reduce it further.

==== Medicare Advantage ====
Medicare Advantage plans expand the health insurance options for people with Medicare. Medicare Advantage was created under the Balanced Budget Act of 1997, with the intent to better control the rapid growth in Medicare spending, as well as to provide Medicare beneficiaries more choices. But on average, Medicare Advantage plans cost 12% more than traditional Medicare. The ACA took steps to align payments to Medicare Advantage plans with the cost of traditional Medicare.

There is some evidence that Medicare Advantage plans select patients with low risk of incurring major medical expenses to maximize profits at the expense of traditional Medicare.

==== Medicare Part D ====
Medicare Part D provides a private insurance option to allow Medicare beneficiaries to purchase subsidized coverage for the costs of prescription drugs. It was enacted as part of the Medicare Prescription Drug, Improvement, and Modernization Act of 2003 (MMA) and went into effect on January 1, 2006.

=== Medicaid ===
Medicaid was instituted for the very poor in 1965. Since enrollees must pass a means test, Medicaid is a social welfare or social protection program rather than a social insurance program. Despite its establishment, the percentage of US residents who lack any form of health insurance has increased since 1994. It has been reported that the number of physicians accepting Medicaid has decreased in recent years because of lower reimbursement rates.

The Affordable Care Act dramatically expanded Medicaid. The program now covers everyone with incomes under 133% of the federal poverty level who does not qualify for Medicare, provided this expansion of coverage has been accepted by the state where the person resides. Meanwhile, Medicaid benefits must be the same as the essential benefit in the newly created state exchanges. The federal government will fully fund the expansion of Medicaid initially, with some of the financial responsibility (10% of medical costs) gradually devolving back to the states by 2020.

=== Children's Health Insurance Program (CHIP) ===
The Children's Health Insurance Program (CHIP) is a joint state/federal program to provide health insurance to children in families who earn too much money to qualify for Medicaid, yet cannot afford to buy private insurance. The statutory authority for CHIP is under title XXI of the Social Security Act. CHIP programs are run by the individual states according to requirements set by the federal Centers for Medicare and Medicaid Services, and may be structured as independent programs separate from Medicaid (separate child health programs), as expansions of their Medicaid programs (CHIP Medicaid expansion programs), or combine these approaches (CHIP combination programs). States receive enhanced federal funds for their CHIP programs at a rate above the regular Medicaid match.

=== Military health benefits ===
Health benefits are provided to active duty service members, retired service members and their dependents by the Department of Defense Military Health System (MHS). The MHS consists of a direct care network of Military Treatment Facilities and a purchased care network known as TRICARE. Additionally, veterans may also be eligible for benefits through the Veterans Health Administration.

=== Indian health service ===
The Indian Health Service (IHS) provides medical assistance to eligible American Indians at IHS facilities, and helps pay the cost of some services provided by non-IHS health care providers.

== Private health care coverage ==
Private health insurance may be purchased on a group basis (e.g., by a firm to cover its employees) or purchased by individual consumers. Most Americans with private health insurance receive it through an employer-sponsored program. According to the United States Census Bureau, some 60% of Americans are covered through an employer, while about 9% purchase health insurance directly. Private insurance was billed for 12.2 million inpatient hospital stays in 2011, incurring approximately 29% ($112.5 billion) of the total aggregate inpatient hospital costs in the United States.

The US has a joint federal and state system for regulating insurance, with the federal government ceding primary responsibility to the states under the McCarran–Ferguson Act. States regulate the content of health insurance policies and often require coverage of specific types of medical services or health care providers. State mandates generally do not apply to the health plans offered by large employers because of the preemption clause of the Employee Retirement Income Security Act.

As of 2018, there were 953 health insurance companies in the United States, although the top 10 account for about 53% of revenue and the top 100 account for 95% of revenue.

=== Employer-sponsored ===
Employer-sponsored health insurance is partially paid for by businesses on behalf of their employees as part of an employee benefit package. Most private (non-government) health coverage in the US is employment-based. Nearly all large employers in America offer group health insurance to their employees. The typical large-employer PPO plan is typically more generous than either Medicare or the Federal Employees Health Benefits Program Standard Option.

The employer typically makes a substantial contribution towards the cost of coverage. Typically, employers pay about 85% of the insurance premium for their employees, and about 75% of the premium for their employees' dependents. The employee pays the remaining fraction of the premium, usually with pre-tax/tax-exempt earnings. These percentages have been stable since 1999. Health benefits provided by employers are also tax-favored: Employee contributions can be made on a pre-tax basis if the employer offers the benefits through a section 125 cafeteria plan.

Workers who receive employer-sponsored health insurance tend to be paid less in cash wages than they would be without the benefit, because of the cost of insurance premiums to the employer and the value of the benefit to the worker. The value to workers is generally greater than the wage reduction because of economies of scale, a reduction in adverse selection pressures on the insurance pool (premiums are lower when all employees participate rather than just the sickest), and reduced income taxes. Disadvantages to workers include disruptions related to changing jobs, the regressive tax effect (high-income workers benefit far more from the tax exemption for premiums than low-income workers), and increased spending on healthcare.

Costs for employer-paid health insurance are rising rapidly: between 2001 and 2007, premiums for family coverage have increased 78%, while wages have risen 19% and inflation has risen 17%, according to a 2007 study by the Kaiser Family Foundation. Employer costs have risen noticeably per hour worked, and vary significantly. In particular, average employer costs for health benefits vary by firm size and occupation. The cost per hour of health benefits is generally higher for workers in higher-wage occupations, but represent a smaller percentage of payroll. The percentage of total compensation devoted to health benefits has been rising since the 1960s. Average premiums, including both the employer and employee portions, were $4,704 for single coverage and $12,680 for family coverage in 2008.

However, in a 2007 analysis, the Employee Benefit Research Institute concluded that the availability of employment-based health benefits for active workers in the US is stable. The "take-up rate," or percentage of eligible workers participating in employer-sponsored plans, has fallen somewhat, but not sharply. EBRI interviewed employers for the study, and found that others might follow if a major employer discontinued health benefits. Effective by January 1, 2014, the Patient Protection and Affordable Care Act will impose a $2000 per employee tax penalty on employers with over 50 employees who do not offer health insurance to their full-time workers. (In 2008, over 95% of employers with at least 50 employees offered health insurance.) On the other hand, public policy changes could also result in a reduction in employer support for employment-based health benefits.

Although much more likely to offer retiree health benefits than small firms, the percentage of large firms offering these benefits fell from 66% in 1988 to 34% in 2002.

According to Jacob Hacker, the development of employer-based health insurance during World War II has contributed to the difficulty in the United States of enacting reforms to the health insurance system.

==== Small employer group coverage ====
According to a 2007 study, about 59% of employers at small firms (3–199 workers) in the US provide employee health insurance. The percentage of small firms offering coverage has been dropping steadily since 1999. The study notes that cost remains the main reason cited by small firms who do not offer health benefits. Small firms that are new are less likely to offer coverage than ones that have been in existence for a number of years. For example, using 2005 data for firms with fewer than 10 employees, 43% of those that had been in existence at least 20 years offered coverage, but only 24% of those that had been in existence less than 5 years did. The volatility of offer rates from year to year also appears to be higher for newer small businesses.

The types of coverage available to small employers are similar to those offered by large firms, but small businesses do not have the same options for financing their benefit plans. In particular, self-funded health care (whereby an employer provides health or disability benefits to employees with its own funds rather than contracting an insurance company) is not a practical option for most small employers. A RAND Corporation study published in April 2008 found that the cost of health care coverage places a greater burden on small firms, as a percentage of payroll, than on larger firms. A study published by the American Enterprise Institute in August 2008 examined the effect of state benefit mandates on self-employed individuals, and found that "the larger the number of mandates in a state, the lower the probability that a self-employed person will be a significant employment generator." Beneficiary cost sharing is, on average, higher among small firms than large firms.

When small group plans are medically underwritten, employees are asked to provide health information about themselves and their covered family members when they apply for coverage. When determining rates, insurance companies use the medical information on these applications. Sometimes they will request additional information from an applicant's physician or ask the applicants for clarification.

States regulate small group premium rates, typically by placing limits on the premium variation allowable between groups (rate bands). Insurers price to recover their costs over their entire book of small group business while abiding by state rating rules. Over time, the effect of initial underwriting "wears off" as the cost of a group regresses towards the mean. Recent claim experience—whether better or worse than average—is a strong predictor of future costs in the near term. But the average health status of a particular small employer group tends to regress over time towards that of an average group. The process used to price small group coverage changes when a state enacts small group reform laws.

Insurance brokers play a significant role in helping small employers find health insurance, particularly in more competitive markets. Average small group commissions range from 2 percent to 8 percent of premiums. Brokers provide services beyond insurance sales, such as assisting with employee enrollment and helping to resolve benefits issues.

==== College-sponsored health insurance for students ====
Many colleges, universities, graduate schools, professional schools and trade schools offer a school-sponsored health insurance plan. Many schools require that students enroll in the school-sponsored plan unless they are able to show that they have comparable coverage from another source.

Effective group health plan years beginning after September 23, 2010, if an employer-sponsored health plan allows employees' children to enroll in coverage, then the health plan must allow employees' adult children to enroll as well as long as the adult child is not yet age 26. Some group health insurance plans may also require that the adult child not be eligible for other group health insurance coverage, but only before 2014.

This extension of coverage will help cover one in three young adults, according to White House documents.

==== Federal employees health benefit plan (FEHBP) ====
In addition to such public plans as Medicare and Medicaid, the federal government also sponsors a health benefit plan for federal employees—the Federal Employees Health Benefits Program (FEHBP). FEHBP provides health benefits to full-time civilian employees. Active-duty service members, retired service members and their dependents are covered through the Department of Defense Military Health System (MHS). FEHBP is managed by the federal Office of Personnel Management.

=== COBRA coverage ===
The Consolidated Omnibus Budget Reconciliation Act of 1985 (COBRA) enables certain individuals with employer-sponsored coverage to extend their coverage if certain qualifying events would otherwise cause them to lose it. Employers may require COBRA-qualified individuals to pay the full cost of coverage, and coverage cannot be extended indefinitely. COBRA only applies to firms with 20 or more employees, although some states also have "mini-COBRA" laws that apply to small employers.

=== Association Health Plan (AHP) ===
In the late 1990s federal legislation had been proposed to "create federally-recognized Association Health Plans which was then "referred to in some bills as 'Small Business Health Plans.' The National Association of Insurance Commissioners (NAIC), which is the "standard-setting and regulatory of chief insurance regulators from all states, the District of Columbia and territories, cautioned against implementing AHPs citing "plan failures like we saw The Multiple Employer Welfare Arrangements (MEWAs) in the 1990s." "[S]mall businesses in California such as dairy farmers, car dealers, and accountants created AHPs "to buy health insurance on the premise that a bigger pool of enrollees would get them a better deal." A November 2017 article in the Los Angeles Times described how there were only four remaining AHPs in California. Many of the AHPs filed for bankruptcy, "sometimes in the wake of fraud." State legislators were forced to pass "sweeping changes in the 1990s" that almost made AHPs extinct.

According to a 2000 Congressional Budget Office (CBO) report, Congress passed legislation creating "two new vehicles Association Health Plans (AHPs) and HealthMarts, to facilitate the sale of health insurance coverage to employees of small firms" in response to concerns about the "large and growing number of uninsured people in the United States."

In March 2017, the U.S. House of Representatives passed the Small Business Health Fairness Act (H.R. 1101), which established "requirements for creating a federally-certified AHP, including for certification itself, sponsors and boards of trustees, participation and coverage, nondiscrimination, contribution rates, and voluntary termination."

AHPs would be "exempt from most state regulation and oversight, subject only to Employee Retirement Income Security Act (ERISA) and oversight by the U.S. Department of Labor, and most proposals would also allow for interstate plans."

Critics said that "Exemptions would lead to market instability and higher premiums in the traditional small-group market. AHPs exempt from state regulation and oversight would enable them to be more selective about who they cover. They will be less likely to cover higher-risk populations, which would cause an imbalance in the risk pool for other small business health plans that are part of the state small group risk pool. Adverse selection would likely abound and Association Health Plans would be selling an unregulated product alongside small group plans, which creates an unlevel playing field." According to the Congressional Budget Office (CBO), "[p]remiums would go up for those buying in the traditional small-group market." competing against AHPs that offer less expensive and less comprehensive plans.

The National Association of Insurance Commissioners (NAIC), the National Governors' Association and "several insurance and consumer groups" opposed the AHP legislation. The NAIC issued a Consumer Alert regarding AHPs, as proposed in Developing the Next Generation of Small Businesses Act of 2017. H.R. 1774. Their statement said that AHP's "[t]hreaten the stability of the small group market" and provide "inadequate benefits and insufficient protection to consumers." Under AHPs, "[f]ewer consumers would have their rights protected, "AHPs would also be exempt from state solvency requirements, putting consumers at serious risk of incurring medical claims that cannot be paid by their Association Health Plan."

In November 2017, President Trump directed "the Department of Labor to investigate ways that would "allow more small businesses to avoid many of the [Affordable Care Act's] costly requirements." Under the ACA, small-employer and individual markets had "gained important consumer protections under the ACA and state health laws — including minimum benefit levels." In a December 28, 2017 interview with the New York Times, Trump explained that, "We've created associations, millions of people are joining associations. ...That were formerly in Obamacare or didn't have insurance. Or didn't have health care. ...It could be as high as 50 percent of the people. So now you have associations, and people don't even talk about the associations. That could be half the people are going to be joining up...So now you have associations and the individual mandate. I believe that because of the individual mandate and the association".

Final rules were released by the Department of Labor on June 19, 2018. Prior to the effective date of April 1, 2019, a federal judge invalidated the rule. The court found that the DOL had failed to set meaningful limits on AHPs. The Court of Appeals for the District of Columbia Circuit granted the Trump Administration an expedited appeal. A three-judge panel heard oral arguments on November 14, 2019.

=== Individually purchased ===
Prior to the ACA, effective in 2014, the individual market was often subject to medical underwriting which made it difficult for individuals with pre-existing conditions to purchase insurance. The ACA prohibited medical underwriting in the individual market for health insurance marketplace plans.

Prior to the ACA as of 2007, about 9% of Americans were covered under health insurance purchased directly. The range of products available is similar to those provided through employers. However, average out-of-pocket spending is higher in the individual market, with higher deductibles, co-payments and other cost-sharing provisions. While self-employed individuals receive a tax deduction for their health insurance and can buy health insurance with additional tax benefits, most consumers in the individual market do not receive any tax benefit.

=== Types of medical insurance ===
==== Traditional indemnity or fee-for-service ====
Early hospital and medical plans offered by insurance companies paid either a fixed amount for specific diseases or medical procedures (schedule benefits) or a percentage of the provider's fee. The relationship between the patient and the medical provider was not changed. The patient received medical care and was responsible for paying the provider. If the service was covered by the policy, the insurance company was responsible for reimbursing or indemnifying the patient based on the provisions of the insurance contract ("reimbursement benefits"). Health insurance plans that are not based on a network of contracted providers, or that base payments on a percentage of provider charges, are still described as indemnity or fee-for-service plans.

==== Blue Cross Blue Shield Association ====
The Blue Cross Blue Shield Association (BCBSA) is a federation of 38 separate health insurance organizations and companies in the United States. Combined, they directly or indirectly provide health insurance to over 100 million Americans. BCBSA insurance companies are franchisees, independent of the association (and traditionally each other), offering insurance plans within defined regions under one or both of the association's brands. Blue Cross Blue Shield insurers offer some form of health insurance coverage in every U.S. state, and also act as administrators of Medicare in many states or regions of the United States, and provide coverage to state government employees as well as to federal government employees under a nationwide option of the Federal Employees Health Benefit Plan.

==== Health Maintenance Organizations ====
A health maintenance organization (HMO) is a type of managed care organization (MCO) that provides a form of health care coverage that is fulfilled through hospitals, doctors, and other providers with which the HMO has a contract. The Health Maintenance Organization Act of 1973 required employers with 25 or more employees to offer federally certified HMO options. Unlike traditional indemnity insurance, an HMO covers only care rendered by those doctors and other professionals who have agreed to treat patients in accordance with the HMO's guidelines and restrictions in exchange for a steady stream of customers. Benefits are provided through a network of providers. Providers may be employees of the HMO ("staff model"), employees of a provider group that has contracted with the HMO ("group model"), or members of an independent practice association ("IPA model"). HMOs may also use a combination of these approaches ("network model").

==== Managed care ====
The term managed care is used to describe a variety of techniques intended to reduce the cost of health benefits and improve the quality of care. It is also used to describe organizations that use these techniques ("managed care organization"). Many of these techniques were pioneered by HMOs, but they are now used in a wide variety of private health insurance programs. Through the 1990s, managed care grew from about 25% US employees with employer-sponsored coverage to the vast majority.

Rise of managed care in the US
Year	Conventional plans	HMOs	PPOs	POS plans	HDHP/SOs
1998	14%	27%	35%	24%	—
1999	10%	28%	39%	24%	—
2000	8%	29%	42%	21%	—
2001	7%	24%	46%	23%	—
2002	4%	27%	52%	18%	—
2003	5%	24%	54%	17%	—
2004	5%	25%	55%	15%	—
2005	3%	21%	61%	15%	—
2006	3%	20%	60%	13%	4%
2007	3%	21%	57%	15%	5%
2008	2%	20%	58%	12%	8%
2009	1%	20%	60%	10%	8%
2010	1%	19%	58%	8%	13%
2011	1%	17%	55%	10%	17%
2012	<1%	16%	56%	9%	19%
2013	<1%	14%	57%	9%	20%
2014	<1%	13%	55%	23%	27%
2015	1%	17%	50%	26%	26%
2016	2%	23%	35%	32%	28%

===== Network-based managed care =====
Many managed care programs are based on a panel or network of contracted health care providers. Such programs typically include:

- A set of selected providers that furnish a comprehensive array of health care services to enrollees;
- Explicit standards for selecting providers;
- Formal utilization review and quality improvement programs;
- An emphasis on preventive care; and
- Financial incentives to encourage enrollees to use care efficiently.

Provider networks can be used to reduce costs by negotiating favorable fees from providers, selecting cost effective providers, and creating financial incentives for providers to practice more efficiently. A survey issued in 2009 by America's Health Insurance Plans found that patients going to out-of-network providers are sometimes charged extremely high fees.

Network-based plans may be either closed or open. With a closed network, enrollees' expenses are generally only covered when they go to network providers. Only limited services are covered outside the network—typically only emergency and out-of-area care. Most traditional HMOs were closed network plans. Open network plans provide some coverage when an enrollee uses non-network provider, generally at a lower benefit level to encourage the use of network providers. Most preferred provider organization plans are open-network (those that are not are often described as exclusive provider organizations, or EPOs), as are point of service (POS) plans.

The terms open panel and closed panel are sometimes used to describe which health care providers in a community have the opportunity to participate in a plan. In a closed-panel HMO, the network providers are either HMO employees (staff model) or members of large group practices with which the HMO has a contract. In an open-panel plan, the HMO or PPO contracts with independent practitioners, opening participation in the network to any provider in the community that meets the plan's credential requirements and is willing to accept the terms of the plan's contract.

===== Other managed care techniques =====
Other managed care techniques include such elements as disease management, case management, wellness incentives, patient education, utilization management and utilization review. These techniques can be applied to both network-based benefit programs and benefit programs that are not based on a provider network. The use of managed care techniques without a provider network is sometimes described as "managed indemnity".

==== Blurring lines ====
Over time, the operations of many Blue Cross and Blue Shield operations have become more similar to those of commercial health insurance companies. However, some Blue Cross and Blue Shield plans continue to serve as insurers of last resort. Similarly, the benefits offered by Blues plans, commercial insurers, and HMOs are converging in many respects because of market pressures. One example is the convergence of preferred provider organization (PPO) plans offered by Blues and commercial insurers and the point of service plans offered by HMOs. Historically, commercial insurers, Blue Cross and Blue Shield plans, and HMOs might be subject to different regulatory oversight in a state (e.g., the Department of Insurance for insurance companies, versus the Department of Health for HMOs). Today, it is common for commercial insurance companies to have HMOs as subsidiaries, and for HMOs to have insurers as subsidiaries (the state license for an HMO is typically different from that for an insurance company). At one time the distinctions between traditional indemnity insurance, HMOs and PPOs were very clear; today, it can be difficult to distinguish between the products offered by the various types of organization operating in the market.

The blurring of distinctions between the different types of health care coverage can be seen in the history of the industry's trade associations. The two primary HMO trade associations were the Group Health Association of America and the American Managed Care and Review Association. After merging, they were known as American Association of Health Plans (AAHP). The primary trade association for commercial health insurers was the Health Insurance Association of America (HIAA). These two have now merged, and are known as America's Health Insurance Plans (AHIP).

==== New types of medical plans ====
In recent years, various new types of medical plans have been introduced.

High-deductible health plan (HDHP)
Plans with much higher deductibles than traditional health plans—primarily providing coverage for catastrophic illness—have been introduced. Because of the high deductible, these provide little coverage for everyday expenses—and thus have potentially high out-of-pocket expenses—but do cover major expenses. Coupled with these are various forms of savings plans.
Tax-preferenced health care spending account
Coupled with high-deductible plans are various tax-advantaged savings plans—funds (such as salary) can be placed in a savings plan, and then be used to pay out-of-pocket expenses. This approach to addressing increasing premiums is dubbed consumer-driven healthcare, and received a boost in 2003 when President George W. Bush signed into law the Medicare Prescription Drug, Improvement, and Modernization Act. The law created tax-deductible health savings accounts (HSAs), untaxed private bank accounts for medical expenses, which can be established by those who already have health insurance. Withdrawals from HSAs are only penalized if the money is spent on non-medical items or services. Funds can be used to pay for qualified expenses, including doctor's fees, Medicare Parts A and B, and drugs, without being taxed.
Consumers wishing to deposit pre-tax funds in an HSA must be enrolled in a high-deductible insurance plan (HDHP) with a number of restrictions on benefit design; in 2007, qualifying plans must have a minimum deductible of US$1,050. Currently, the minimum deductible has risen to $1.200 for individuals and $2,400 for families. HSAs enable healthier individuals to pay less for insurance and deposit money for their own future health care, dental and vision expenses.
HSAs are one form of tax-preferenced health care spending accounts. Others include flexible spending accounts (FSAs), Archer Medical Savings Accounts (MSAs), which have been superseded by the new HSAs (although existing MSAs are grandfathered), and health reimbursement accounts (HRAs). These accounts are most commonly used as part of an employee health benefit package. While there are currently no government-imposed limits to FSAs, legislation currently being reconciled between the House of Representatives and Senate would impose a cap of $2,500. While both the House and Senate bills would adjust the cap to inflation, approximately 7 million Americans who use their FSAs to cover out-of-pocket health care expenses greater than $2,500 would be forced to pay higher taxes and health care costs.
In July 2009, Save Flexible Spending Plans, a national grassroots advocacy organization, was formed to protect against the restricted use of FSAs in health care reform efforts. Save Flexible Spending Accounts is sponsored by the Employers Council on Flexible Compensation (ECFC), a non-profit organization "dedicated to the maintenance and expansion of the private employee benefits on a tax-advantaged basis". ECFC members include companies such as WageWorks Inc., a benefits provider based in San Mateo, California.
Most FSA participants are middle-income Americans, earning approximately $55,000 annually. Individuals and families with chronic illnesses typically receive the most benefit from FSAs; even when insured, they incur annual out-of-pocket expenses averaging $4,398. Approximately 44 percent of Americans have one or more chronic conditions.
Limited benefit plan
Opposite to high-deductible plans are plans which provide limited benefits—up to a low level—have also been introduced. These limited medical benefit plans pay for routine care and do not pay for catastrophic care; they do not provide equivalent financial security to a major medical plan. Annual benefit limits can be as low as $2,000. Lifetime maximums can be very low as well.
Discount medical card
One option that is becoming more popular is the discount medical card. These cards are not insurance policies, but provide access to discounts from participating health care providers. While some offer a degree of value, there are serious potential drawbacks for the consumer.
Short term
Short-term health insurance plans have a short policy period (typically months) and are intended for people who only need insurance for a short time period before longer-term insurance is obtained. Short-term plans typically cost less than traditional plans and have shorter application processes, but do not cover pre-existing conditions.
Health care sharing
A health care sharing ministry is an organization that facilitates sharing of health care costs between individual members who have common ethical or religious beliefs. Though a health care sharing ministry is not an insurance company, members are exempted from the individual responsibility requirements of the Patient Protection and Affordable Care Act.

=== Health care markets and pricing ===
The US health insurance market is highly concentrated, as leading insurers have carried out over 400 mergers from the mid-1990s to the mid-2000s (decade). In 2000, the two largest health insurers (Aetna and UnitedHealth Group) had total membership of 32 million. By 2006 the top two insurers, WellPoint (now Anthem) and UnitedHealth, had total membership of 67 million. The two companies together had more than 36% of the national market for commercial health insurance. The AMA has said that it "has long been concerned about the impact of consolidated markets on patient care." A 2007 AMA study found that in 299 of the 313 markets surveyed, one health plan accounted for at least 30% of the combined health maintenance organization (HMO)/preferred provider organization (PPO) market. In 90% of markets, the largest insurer controls at least 30% of the market, and the largest insurer controls more than 50% of the market in 54% of metropolitan areas. The US Department of Justice has recognized this percentage of market control as conferring substantial monopsony power in the relations between insurer and physicians.

Most provider markets (especially hospitals) are also highly concentrated—roughly 80%, according to criteria established by the FTC and Department of Justice—so insurers usually have little choice about which providers to include in their networks, and consequently little leverage to control the prices they pay. Large insurers frequently negotiate most-favored nation clauses with providers, agreeing to raise rates significantly while guaranteeing that providers will charge other insurers higher rates. Empirical evidence shows that greater insurance consolidation leads to higher insurance premiums.

According to some experts, such as Uwe Reinhardt, Sherry Glied, Megan Laugensen, Michael Porter, and Elizabeth Teisberg, this pricing system is highly inefficient and is a major cause of rising health care costs. Health care costs in the United States vary enormously between plans and geographical regions, even when input costs are fairly similar, and rise very quickly. Health care costs have risen faster than economic growth at least since the 1970s. Public health insurance programs typically have more bargaining power as a result of their greater size and typically pay less for medical services than private plans, leading to slower cost growth, but the overall trend in health care prices have led public programs' costs to grow at a rapid pace as well.

== Other types of health insurance (non-medical) ==
While the term health insurance is most commonly used by the public to describe coverage for medical expenses, the insurance industry uses the term more broadly to include other related forms of coverage, such as disability income and long-term care insurance.

=== Disability income insurance ===
Disability income (DI) insurance pays benefits to individuals who become unable to work because of injury or illness. DI insurance replaces income lost while the policyholder is unable to work during a period of disability (in contrast to medical expense insurance, which pays for the cost of medical care). For most working-age adults, the risk of disability is greater than the risk of premature death, and the resulting reduction in lifetime earnings can be significant. Private disability insurance is sold on both a group and an individual basis. Policies may be designed to cover long-term disabilities (LTD coverage) or short-term disabilities (STD coverage). Business owners can also purchase disability overhead insurance to cover the overhead expenses of their business while they are unable to work.

A basic level of disability income protection is provided through the Social Security Disability Insurance (SSDI) program for qualified workers who are totally and permanently disabled (the worker is incapable of engaging in any "substantial gainful work" and the disability is expected to last at least 12 months or result in death).

=== Long-term care insurance ===
Long-term care (LTC) insurance reimburses the policyholder for the cost of long-term or custodial care services designed to minimize or compensate for the loss of functioning due to age, disability or chronic illness. LTC has many surface similarities to long-term disability insurance. There are at least two fundamental differences, however. LTC policies cover the cost of certain types of chronic care, while long-term-disability policies replace income lost while the policyholder is unable to work. For LTC, the event triggering benefits is the need for chronic care, while the triggering event for disability insurance is the inability to work.

Private LTC insurance is growing in popularity in the US. Premiums have remained relatively stable in recent years. However, the coverage is quite expensive, especially when consumers wait until retirement age to purchase it. The average age of new purchasers was 61 in 2005, and has been dropping.

== Supplemental coverage ==
Private insurers offer a variety of supplemental coverages in both the group and individual markets. These are not designed to provide the primary source of medical or disability protection for an individual, but can assist with unexpected expenses and provide additional peace of mind for insureds. Supplemental coverages include Medicare supplement insurance, hospital indemnity insurance, dental insurance, vision insurance, accidental death and dismemberment insurance and specified disease insurance.

Supplemental coverages are intended to:

- Supplement a primary medical expense plan by paying for expenses that are excluded or subject to the primary plan's cost-sharing requirements (e.g., co-payments, deductibles, etc.);
- Cover related expenses such as dental or vision care;
- Assist with additional expenses that may be associated with a serious illness or injury.

=== Medicare Supplement Coverage (Medigap) ===
Medicare Supplement policies are designed to cover expenses not covered (or only partially covered) by the original Medicare (Parts A and B) fee-for-service benefits. They are only available to individuals enrolled in Medicare Parts A and B. Medigap plans may be purchased on a guaranteed issue basis (no health questions asked) during a six-month open enrollment period when an individual first becomes eligible for Medicare. The benefits offered by Medigap plans are standardized.

=== Hospital indemnity insurance ===
Hospital indemnity insurance provides a fixed daily, weekly or monthly benefit while the insured is confined in a hospital. The payment is not dependent on actual hospital charges, and is most commonly expressed as a flat dollar amount. Hospital indemnity benefits are paid in addition to any other benefits that may be available, and are typically used to pay out-of-pocket and non-covered expenses associated with the primary medical plan, and to help with additional expenses (e.g., child care) incurred while in the hospital.

==== Scheduled health insurance plans ====
Scheduled health insurance plans are an expanded form of hospital indemnity plans. In recent years, these plans have taken the name mini-med plans or association plans. These plans may provide benefits for hospitalization, surgical, and physician services. However, they are not meant to replace a traditional comprehensive health insurance plan. Scheduled health insurance plans are a basic policy providing access to day-to-day health care, such as going to the doctor or getting a prescription drug, but these benefits will be limited and are not meant to be effective for catastrophic events. Payments are based upon the plan's schedule of benefits and are usually paid directly to the service provider. These plans cost much less than comprehensive health insurance. Annual benefit maximums for a typical scheduled health insurance plan may range from $1,000 to $25,000.

=== Dental insurance ===
Dental insurance helps pay for the cost of necessary dental care. Few medical expense plans include coverage for dental expenses. About 97% of dental benefits in the United States are provided through separate policies from carriers—both stand-alone and medical affiliates—that specialize in this coverage. Typically, these dental plans offer comprehensive preventive benefits. However, major dental expenses, such as crowns and root canals, are only partially covered. Also, most carriers offer a lower rate if one selects a plan that utilizes their network providers. Discount dental programs are also available. These do not constitute insurance, but provide participants with access to discounted fees for dental work.

=== Vision care insurance ===
Vision care insurance provides coverage for routine eye care and is typically written to complement other medical benefits. Vision benefits are designed to encourage routine eye examinations and ensure that appropriate treatment is provided.

=== Specified disease ===
Specified disease provides benefits for one or more specifically identified conditions. Benefits can be used to fill gaps in a primary medical plan, such as co-payments and deductibles, or to assist with additional expenses such as transportation and child care costs.

=== Accidental death and dismemberment insurance ===
Accidental death and dismemberment (AD&D) insurance is offered by group insurers and provides benefits in the event of accidental death. It also provides benefits for certain specified types of bodily injuries (e.g., loss of a limb or loss of sight) when they are the direct result of an accident.

== Criticism ==
The United States' system of using health insurance as a means of financing health care costs has been criticized. The following are examples of such criticisms:

- Beliefs that negatives derived from inefficient negotiation with hospital systems and markets.
- Insurance companies have high administrative costs. Private health insurers are a significant portion of the U.S. economy directly employing (in 2004) almost 470,000 people at an average salary of $61,409.
- Health insurance companies are not actually providing traditional insurance, which involves the pooling of risk, because the vast majority of purchasers actually do face the harms that they are "insuring" against. Instead, as Edward Beiser and Jacob Appel have separately argued, health insurers are better thought of as low-risk money managers who pocket the interest on what are really long-term healthcare savings accounts.
- According to a 2010 study by Health Care for America NOW!, a pro-health reform group, the nation's largest five health insurance companies posted a 56 percent gain in 2009 profits over 2008. The insurers (Anthem, UnitedHealth, Cigna, Aetna and Humana) cover the majority of Americans with health insurance.
- Ed Weisbart, the former chief medical officer of Express Scripts, one of the largest prescription drug benefit managers in the United States as of 2025, informed The Guardian that organizations like UnitedHealthcare are declining to perform initial scans. He indicated that there is evidence pointing to the fact that these delays are resulting in fatalities. The motivation behind these companies' actions is to increase their profits.
- The killing of Brian Thompson, the CEO of UnitedHealthcare, a health insurance provider, occurred on December 4, 2024. This incident revealed that 62% of Americans believe the federal government should be accountable for guaranteeing health insurance coverage for its citizens.

== See also ==
- Broccoli mandate
- Health care reform
- Healthcare reform in the United States
- Health insurance costs in the United States
- Health insurance coverage in the United States
- History of public health in the United States
- List of healthcare reform advocacy groups in the United States
- Killing of Brian Thompson
- Massachusetts health care reform
- Medicare Rights Center
- Medicaid estate recovery
- Medicare for All Act
- Physicians for a National Health Program
- Publicly funded health care
- RAND Health Insurance Experiment
- Sicko
- Single-payer healthcare

General:

- Health economics
- National health insurance
- Public health
- Universal health care
- Welfare
