= Geographic pricing cost index =

Economic index

Geographic Practice Cost Index is used along with Relative Value Units by Medicare to determine allowable payment amounts for medical procedures. There are multiple GPCIs: Cost of Living, Malpractice, and Practice Cost/Expense. These categories allow Medicare to adjust reimbursement rates to take into account regional and practice-specific factors.

An example calculation for a Medicare allowed amount is:

2009 Non-Facility Pricing Amount = [(Work RVU * Work GPCI) + (Transitioned Non-Facility PE RVU * PE GPCI) + (MP RVU * MP GPCI)] * Conversion Factor (CF)

== Cost of health insurance in the United States ==
In the United States, access to health insurance is strongly affected by the cost of medical insurance. Rising health insurance costs have led to an increasing number of consumers being uninsured, and higher insurance costs together with rising healthcare expenditures have prompted insurers to offer more plans with higher deductibles and other restrictions that require consumers to pay a larger share of costs out of pocket.

In regions with higher costs of living and healthcare, insurance premiums are generally higher.

In March 2010, Iowa elder-rights advocates and AARP urged state lawmakers to pass a measure that would require state regulators to hold hearings when rate increases are proposed and to publish an annual report on insurance rates.

== See also ==
- Medicare Sustainable Growth Rate
