= Chargemaster =

Chargeable items billed to a hospital patient

In the United States, the chargemaster, also known as charge master, or charge description master (CDM), is a comprehensive listing of items billable to a hospital patient or a patient's health insurance provider. In practice, it usually contains highly inflated prices at several times that of actual costs to the hospital. The chargemaster typically serves as the starting point for negotiations with patients and health insurance providers of what amount of money will actually be paid to the hospital. It is described as "the central mechanism of the revenue cycle" of a hospital.

== Description ==
The chargemaster may be alternatively referred to as the "charge master", "hospital chargemaster", or the "charge description master" (CDM). It is a comprehensive listing of items billable to a hospital patient or a patient's health insurance provider. It is described as "the central mechanism of the revenue cycle" of a hospital. Chargemasters include thousands of hospital services, medical procedures, equipment fees, drugs, supplies, and diagnostic evaluations such as imaging and blood tests. Each item in the chargemaster is assigned a unique identifier code and a set price that are used to generate patient bills. Every hospital system maintains its own chargemaster. Traditionally, hospitals regarded their chargemaster, alongside the medical codes that catalogue the billing items, as a trade secret that is central to their business, and state laws and courts have historically accepted the view that these are proprietary information.

The procedure of developing, maintaining, and monitoring the chargemaster and its pricing scheme often necessitates multiple hospital employees working under the supervision of a "chargemaster coordinator", a "charge master manager", or others in the health care system's operations or administrative support areas frequently called a "charge master team". Ultimate responsibility for ensuring accuracy of the chargemaster rests with each hospital's chief financial officer, compliance officer, and hospital Board. Approximately forty percent of hospitals pay outside companies to help create and then adapt their chargemasters on a yearly basis. According to Essentials of Managed Health Care, as of 2012 the chargemaster file typically included between 20,000 and 50,000 price definitions. The Lewin Group analyzed utilization of the chargemaster and found that a low proportion of hospitals carried out regular reviews of their chargemaster implementation. Costs for patients maintained on the chargemaster differ greatly from hospital to hospital.

Authors J. Patrick Rooney and Dan Perrin note in their book America's Health Care Crisis Solved, "Charge-master rates, in reality, serve as nothing more than the starting point for negotiations" with the payer. The impact of the chargemaster is such that those with good insurance or better access to means to afford quality healthcare pay the least for that care, whereas conversely uninsured, and others who pay out-of-pocket for healthcare pay the full chargemaster listed price for the same services.

== Existing legislation and regulations ==
Federally all hospitals are now required to post their chargemaster on the hospital website.

Hospital price transparency helps Americans know the cost of a hospital item or service before receiving it. Since January 1, 2021, each hospital operating in the United States has been required to provide clear, accessible pricing information online about the items and services it provides in two ways: as a comprehensive machine-readable file with all items and services, and as a display of shoppable services in a consumer-friendly format.

In California, a regulation known as the "Payers' Bill of Rights" (which is unique to the state) requires all hospitals to provide their chargemaster to the state, which then posts them online for the public.

The chargemaster procedure is generally only regulated in Maryland; author Peter Reid Kongstvedt notes in Essentials of Managed Care, "Of particular importance, other than in Maryland, hospitals are generally free to charge whatever they want in their chargemaster."

== Critical analysis ==
Chargemasters gained national attention in early 2013, when in short succession, there were two important publications made. First, there was a Time magazine cover story published February 20, 2013, titled "Bitter Pill: Why Medical Bills Are Killing Us", in which reporter Steven Brill examined the overlooked role that chargemasters played in the American health care system's cost crisis, asserting that they routinely listed extremely high prices "devoid of any calculation related to cost", and were generally regarded as "fiction" in the healthcare industry, despite their significant role in setting prices for both insured and uninsured patients alike. Then, a couple months later, the Centers for Medicare and Medicaid Services published inpatient prices for hospitals across the country in a publicly available format.

"The 'full charges' reflected on hospital Charge Masters are unconscionable", wrote George A. Nation III in a 2005 piece for the Kentucky Law Journal. Health care economist scholar Uwe Reinhardt noted in a 2006 article for Health Affairs that the approach to chargemasters by hospitals would have to be modified to become more transparent, in order to encourage a form of consumer-driven health care to help improve the system. University of California, Berkeley professor of health economics James C. Robinson pointed out prior criticism of the chargemaster, "Much ink has been spilt bemoaning that incomprehensible foundation of hospital cost accounting and prices, the redoubtable chargemaster." Robinson called for greater transparency as well as increased price standardization as steps to help remedy the situation.

In a 2007 article for Health Affairs, Gerard F. Anderson observed, "Without knowing what services they will use in advance, it is impossible for patients to comparison shop." Anderson also noted the esoteric nature of the language on the chargemaster made it difficult for patients and anyone other than hospital administrators to understand. Anderson emphasized the difficulty of patients' ability to interpret the chargemaster in a subsequent 2012 article: "Furthermore, most of the items on the charge master file are written in code so that only the hospital administrators and a few experts in the field can interpret their meanings."

== See also ==
- Charity care
- Dartmouth Atlas of Health Care
- Explanation of benefits (insurance)
- Healthcare Blue Book
- Health care prices
- Health insurance in the United States
- Health insurance costs in the United States
- J. Patrick Rooney
- Medical debt
- Underinsured
