= Private exchange =

Online store for purchasing benefits

A private exchange, also known as a private benefits exchange or private health care exchange, is an online store or health insurance marketplace where employees or retirees purchase health insurance and other benefits, typically using funds contributed by their employer.

== Overview ==
A private exchange is an online marketplace that allows employees or retirees to shop for a personalized benefits package from a broad selection of benefit plans, which often includes medical, vision, dental, life, and disability insurance plans, as well as other offerings including non-insurance products like prepaid legal, FSA's, identity theft protection, and so on. Employers choose the plans and products they wish to offer on a private exchange and allocate funds that their employees or retirees can use to purchase benefits in the marketplace. Exchange users have the option to contribute additional funds beyond their employer contribution should they want to purchase more than the employer contribution covers.

Exchange users log into a web-based portal to select the benefits that best fit their needs. In the portal, users are guided by decision support tools, such as educational articles and videos, plan comparison tools, physician look-up tools, cost estimators, and recommendations to help them make informed choices.

== Features ==
The features of a private exchange include the following:

- Funds for coverage: For active employees, typically a defined contribution model in which employers allocate dollars for each employee to shop for their benefits as opposed to a defined benefit in which employers pay for a specific benefit(s). For retirees, employers often set up a Health Reimbursement Arrangement (HRA), a type of employer-funded health benefit plan that reimburses employees for out-of-pocket medical expenses and sometimes other expenses as well.
- Inventory of medical plans: A selection of medical plans with varying plan types, cost-sharing options, and price points. Some exchanges offer several plans from a single carrier, while others offer plans from several – anywhere from three or four carriers on private exchanges for employees, to over 100 carriers on private Medicare exchanges.
- Voluntary products: While extensive voluntary products are more typical for current employees, as opposed to retirees, products often include dental, vision, life, critical illness, and disability insurance, health savings accounts (HSAs), flexible spending accounts (FSAs), legal plans, and Wellness programs that offer employees additional financial protection for their unique risks and benefits beyond insurance.
- Decision Support: Support, including education, cost estimators, physician look-up tools, and plan recommendation tools, to help employees determine the plans that are right for them
- Comprehensive support services: Phone and email assistance for employees in choosing and using their benefits, as well as account management, customer service, and an administrative portal.

== History ==
Although the concept of private exchanges has existed for decades, the first successful private exchanges arose in the retiree health benefits sector in the form of Medicare exchanges. Medicare exchanges provide retirees with a selection of: Medicare Advantage plans (the more comprehensive Medicare plans offered by private insurers); Medicare Part D Prescription Drug coverage; and Medicare supplement policies, also known as Medigap.

The first Medicare exchange was operated by Extend Health, which launched in 2005, and allowed car manufacturer Chrysler to move its retirees from its cost-prohibitive group plan and into the individual Medicare market, where retirees could choose their coverage to fit their budget and health care needs. (Extend Health was acquired by Willis Towers Watson in 2012.).

It's unclear when exactly the first private exchange for employees was formed. Some of the pioneers include bswift (1996), Liazon (2007) Bloom Health (2009), and Connected Health (2009).

== Types ==
Three major types of companies are building private exchanges:

- Carriers: Most national carriers developed an exchange-like "Medicare connector" offering during the years between 2005 and 2010 to compete with the emerging success of private Medicare exchanges that had entered the market. These connectors provided choice in the form of a number of plans from a single carrier, as opposed to the larger number of plans from several carriers available on the private exchanges. In the group market, numerous regional carriers have partnered with technology platforms to build private exchanges, and several of the large national carriers have also invested in their own technology. In 2014, Cigna launched a private exchange for small employers. In 2011, United purchased Connextions, a technology services company in the healthcare industry. In 2011, WellPoint and two regional Blue Cross Blue Shield plans purchased a majority stake in Bloom Health, a startup private exchange platform. And in 2014, Aetna bought bswift, an exchange technology company.
- Benefit consultants: Four of the major benefit consultancies sponsor a private exchange – Aon (called Aon Active Health Exchange), Buck Consultants/Xerox (recently spun off and now called Conduent), Mercer (called Mercer Marketplace 365), and Willis Towers Watson (called OneExchange).
- Technology platforms: A range of technology vendors support private exchanges to varying degrees. While certain platforms simply provide the technology to run the data and interface of the exchange, others go as far as contracting with carriers and providing a complete exchange solution directly to employers. Vendors include: Maestro Health, Bloom Health, Liazon, bswift, Array Health, Connextions, hCentive, HGS Colibrium, Benefitfocus, and ADP.

== Public exchanges ==
Private exchanges and public exchanges, also known as public health insurance exchanges, both enable the purchase of benefits through an online marketplace. However, private exchanges are offered by employers for use by active and/or retired employees and include health insurance and other types of benefits. Public exchanges, on the other hand, were established under the Affordable Care Act to give individuals the opportunity to purchase health insurance, often with a government subsidy if eligible. Private exchanges are operated by private entities such as brokers, carriers and technology companies, while public exchanges are operated by individual states or the federal government or via a federal/state partnership. Finally, private exchanges typically offer varying degrees of decision support, or ways to guide employees through the benefits selection process, through education and system recommendations. Private exchanges may be accessed by employees throughout the year to review their benefits or make qualifying changes to their coverage, whereas public exchanges currently lack decision support and can only be accessed for Open Enrollment except in the case of a qualifying event.

== Benefits administration platforms ==
While both private exchanges and benefits administration platforms leverage technology to simplify benefits and reduce the administrative burden on HR, private exchanges take a consumer-driven approach to benefits. A benefits administration platform simply allows a transition from paper enrollment to online enrollment.

A defined contribution strategy is common on private exchanges, allowing employers to control costs by setting a defined budget and then letting their employees shop for benefits. In addition, private exchanges provide meaningful choice through multiple benefit types and plan offerings along with decision support to guide employees through the shopping experience.
