= Charity care =

Health care provided at no or low cost to low-income patients

In the United States, charity care is health care provided for free or at reduced prices to low-income patients. The percentage of doctors providing charity care dropped from 76% in 1996–97 to 68% in 2004–2005. Potential reasons for the decline include changes in physician practice patterns and increasing financial pressures. In 2006, Senate investigators found that many hospitals did not inform patients that charity care was available. Some for-profit hospitals provided as much charity care as some non-profit hospitals. Investigators also found that non-profit hospitals charge poor, uninsured patients more than they charge patients with health insurance. Hospitals must provide some charity care if they wish to maintain non-profit status.

One estimate put the cost of uncompensated care for 2004 at $41 billion, of which $34.6 billion was funded through a patchwork of government programs. Over half of all government reimbursement for uncompensated care comes from the federal government; most of that is provided through Medicare and Medicaid. These federal funds are a primary source of support for health care providers that serve the uninsured. Increasing demand for free and low-cost health care services by uninsured patients and Medicaid beneficiaries is, along with increased competition, placing a growing financial strain on safety-net health care providers. Some safety-net providers respond by limiting their charity care exposure and attracting more paying customers.

== State reimbursement for charity care ==
The state of New Jersey has a program to provide reimbursements to hospitals and other health care institutions which provide uncompensated or under-compensated health care to patients lacking private health insurance whose income falls below a certain amount but is too high to qualify them for Medicaid and are not old enough to be eligible for Medicare (New Jersey's situation is somewhat unusual among American states in that the state has no county or municipal hospitals).

The scheme provides free health care to uninsured state residents whose income is up to 200% of the federally designated poverty line, and provides discounts which gradually phase out at incomes between 200% and 300% of the poverty line; the patient's liquid assets (not including the patient's home and one automobile) must not exceed $7,500. Also, the maximum any individual qualifying for aid under the aforementioned criteria can be liable for in a single year is 30% of that patient's gross income for that year. A special fund was designed to compensate the health care provider—which may have furnished inpatient or outpatient services—for the applicable difference in cost. However, New Jersey hospitals are reimbursed for charity care at below their cost to provide these services, which helps account for the fact that in the past two years, nine hospitals have closed in the state and six others have filed for bankruptcy, according to the New Jersey Hospital Association.

Some private health care providers in other states—particularly those that are operated on a nonprofit basis (often by religious entities)—also provide free and/or low-cost health care to uninsured patients, using income thresholds similar to those observed statewide in New Jersey; but state laws vary widely as to how much, if any, reimbursement (usually in the form of tax credits) the institution receives for so doing (and in only one other state besides New Jersey—Washington—does an outright mandate exist to provide charity care). Perhaps the most famous example of such an institution was the Charity Hospital of New Orleans, founded in 1732 and now run by the Medical Center of Louisiana, which is now closed due to damage from Hurricane Katrina.

In 2007, the community hospitals in Washington State agreed to uniform standards for providing free and reduced-cost care to low-income individuals. The new standards were less generous than existing practice for four out of ten community hospitals, but are stronger than existing state law. Care is free for families with incomes below the federal poverty level. Patients may buy care at a cost between one and two times the federal poverty level; between two and three times the federal poverty level, uninsured patients are charged no more than what an average insured patient would pay.

== See also ==
- Charge description master
