= Health insurance costs in the United States =

Health insurance costs are a major factor in access to health coverage in the United States. The rising cost of health insurance leads more consumers to go without coverage and increase in insurance cost and accompanying rise in the cost of health care expenses has led health insurers to provide more policies with higher deductibles and other limitations that require the consumer to pay a greater share of the cost themselves.

== Background ==
According to Senator Dianne Feinstein, the United States is the "only industrialized nation that relies heavily on a for-profit medical insurance industry to provide basic health care." The Kaiser Family Foundation claims that health insurance costs are driven not only by the added cost of health insurers making their profits but also by rising health costs and administrative costs.

In 2004, employer-sponsored health insurance premiums grew 11.2% to $9,950 for family coverage, and $3,695 for a single person, according to a survey by the Kaiser Family Foundation and Health Research and Education Trust. The survey also found that 61% of workers were receiving employer sponsored health insurance.

Five years later, Kaiser's 2009 survey found that employer health insurance premiums were $13,375 for a family and $4,824 for a single person. About 60% of workers were receiving employer sponsored health insurance. Less than half (46%) of employees at small firms with 3 to 9 workers received coverage. As of 2008, the percentage of Americans receiving employer sponsored health insurance had declined for the eighth consecutive year, says the Kaiser Family Foundation.

From 1999 to 2009, Kaiser found that the insurance premiums had climbed 131%, and workers' contribution toward paying that premium jumped 128%. In 1999, workers' average contribution to the premium was $1,543, and in 2009 it was $3,515. For employers, their contribution was $4,247 in 1999 and $9,860 in 2009.

On October 22, 2025 the Kaiser Family Foundation released a report in which it stated that annual premiums for employer sponsored family health coverage reached $26,993 and on average workers contributed $6,850 towards that and $1,886 for single coverage.

The lower a family's income is, the less likely that they can purchase health insurance, according to 2008 US Census figures. About 14.5% of households with $50,000 to $75,000 in income did not have health insurance. While 24.5% of households with $25,000 or less income went without health insurance.

A March 2010 study by the Center for Studying Health System Change, a Washington D.C. think tank, found that out-of-pocket costs for health insurance premiums and services were rising faster than family incomes. Published in the journal Health Affairs, the study found "...After accounting for general inflation, family incomes remained stagnant between 2004 and 2006, while out-of-pocket spending on premiums and health care services increased 8.5% over the two-year period. Overall, total out-of-pocket spending increased, on average, about 5 percent annually between 2001 and 2006, and was similar for the 2001–4 and 2004–6 periods." The report found the largest increases in out-of-pocket expenses were for those with private health insurance, including middle- and higher-income families. The study was based on 2001 through to 2006 data.

== Impacted populations ==
=== Pre-existing conditions ===
People with pre-existing conditions typically cannot obtain any coverage, or at best can obtain limited coverage or more costly coverage for those conditions. This situation was expected to be corrected by the health reform bill being considered by the US Congress in early 2010. Currently, those with pre-existing conditions must pay the cost out-of-pocket, and some resort to medical tourism, obtaining treatment in other countries or US regions, to obtain more affordable health treatment. This is especially difficult for those impacted by cancer, heart condition and other serious illnesses where treatment costs can easily run into the tens of thousands of dollars or higher within a few days or weeks. According to the Kaiser Family Foundation, 21 percent of those who apply for health insurance on their own are turned down, charged a higher price or denied coverage for their pre-existing condition. Among the conditions that be considered "pre-existing" by insurance companies are domestic violence, cancer, asthma, depression and occupations such as police officer and construction worker.

=== Self-employed ===
The 9 million self-employed workers have a greater challenge than many people to find affordable health insurance. They represent 8 percent of the US labor force, and essentially pay a tax on their health insurance premiums, unlike any other workers. They pay a tax of 15.3 percent of their net earnings, double the rate of wage and salary earners.

=== Low-income families ===
For Americans earning less than $24,000 per year, few have health insurance, or, they rely on government insurance (Medicaid). In this income bracket, more than half of people ages 27 to 37 do not have health insurance. This number drops when people reach their 40s, but even into their late 50s, more than one-third of these Americans are uninsured. When new health reform laws take effect, low-income families will receive subsidies to help them pay for health insurance. These subsidies will paid through higher taxes paid by people with higher incomes.

== State cost-control efforts ==
- California: On March 23, 2010, the California State Assembly's Health Committee passed a bill that would require health insurers and health maintenance organizations to have same strict regulation that has covered automobile and other types of property insurance for the last two decades. The bill would require approval of some rate hikes by state agencies, and must next be considered by the state legislature.
- Iowa: In March 2010, Iowa senior advocates and the AARP asked state legislators to act on a measure that would require state regulators to hold hearings when rate increases are proposed and issue an annual report about insurance rates.
- Massachusetts: The State of Massachusetts held a three-day hearing in March 2010 to discuss ways to better control health insurance and other costs. Addressing these costs, Massachusetts Secretary of Health and Human Services Dr. JudyAnn Bigby said "As we examine all of the causes of increasing health care costs and implement reforms, we must strive to bring premiums down without sacrificing access to care or requiring consumers to pay more out of pocket."

== See also ==
- Health care
- Health care politics
- Health care reform
- Health economics
- Health insurance
- Health insurance in the United States
- Health insurance exchange
- Health insurance mandate
- Health maintenance organization
- Insurance in the United States
