= Defined contribution health benefits =

A Defined Contribution Health Benefit is a consumer-driven health care scheme in the United States in which employers choose a set dollar amount to contribute towards an employee's healthcare.

Under a Defined Contribution Health Plan the employee is responsible for researching and purchasing his or her own insurance policy. Defined contribution health plans are an alternative to traditional employer-sponsored group health insurance plans. A defined contribution health plan by itself is not a health insurance plan, but rather a health benefits strategy. Employer contributions can be made on a tax-free basis when offered under a qualifying plan such as a Section 105 Medial Reimbursement Plan.

== History ==
Similar to a defined contribution plan used by employers to contribute to their employees' retirement savings, defined contribution health plans allow employers to avoid uncertainty by fixing future obligations. Defined Contribution Health Plans have in recent years become a viable method for offering benefits as individual health insurance plans have become more widely available under the Patient Protection and Affordable Care Act (ACA). Industry experts expect that in the coming decade there will be a shift to defined contribution health benefits plans, similar to the recent shift in retirement plans from defined benefit to defined contribution.

== Advantages ==
- Expense Management: Employers can set and predict employee health benefit costs
- Administration Time: Employer setup and administration is generally handled by a third party, minimizing the use of employer resources
- Employee Choice: Employees are able to choose an individual plan that offers the level of coverage and network that they prefer

== See also ==
- CommonSpirit Health
