= Medigap =

Private health insurance that supplements Medicare in the United States

Medigap (also called Medicare supplement insurance or Medicare supplemental insurance) refers to various private health insurance plans sold to supplement Medicare in the United States. Medigap insurance provides coverage for many of the co-pays and some of the co-insurance related to Medicare-covered hospital, skilled nursing facility, home health care, ambulance, durable medical equipment, and doctor charges. Medigap's name is derived from the notion that it exists to cover the difference or "gap" between the expenses reimbursed to providers by Medicare Parts A and B for services and the total amount allowed to be charged for those services by the United States Centers for Medicare and Medicaid Services (CMS).

Over 14 million Americans had Medicare Supplement insurance in 2018 according to a report by the American Association for Medicare Supplement Insurance.

== Medicare recipients under age 65 ==
Recipients of Social Security Disability Insurance (SSDI) benefits or patients with end-stage renal disease (ESRD) are entitled to Medicare coverage regardless of age, but are not automatically entitled to purchase Medigap policies unless they are at least 65. Under federal law, insurers are not required to sell Medigap policies to people under 65, and even if they do, they may use medical screening. However, a slight majority of states require insurers to offer at least one kind of Medigap policy to at least some Medicare recipients in that age group. Of these states, 25 require that Medigap policies be offered to all Medicare recipients. In California, Massachusetts, and Vermont, Medigap policies are not available to ESRD patients.

== Products available ==
Medigap offerings have been standardized by the Centers for Medicare and Medicaid Services (CMS) into ten different plans, labeled A through N, sold and administered by private companies. Each Medigap plan offers a different combination of benefits. The coverage provided is roughly proportional to the premium paid. However, many older Medigap plans (these 'older' plans are no longer marketed) offering minimal benefits will cost more than current plans offering full benefits. The reason behind this is that older plans have an older average age per person enrolled in the plan, causing more claims within the group and raising the premium for all members within the group. Since Medigap is private insurance and not government sponsored, the rules governing the sale and offerings of a Medigap insurance policy can vary from state to state. Some states such as Massachusetts, Minnesota, and Wisconsin require Medigap insurance to provide additional coverage than what is defined in the standardized Medigap plans.

Some employers may provide Medigap coverage as a benefit to their retirees. While Medigap offerings have been standardized since 1992, some seniors who had Medigap plans prior to 1992 are still on non-standard plans. Those plans are no longer eligible for new policies.

Over the years, new laws have brought many changes to Medigap Policies. For example, marketing for plans E, H, I, and J has been stopped as of May 31, 2010. But, if someone was already covered by plan E, H, I, or J before June 1, 2010, they can keep that plan. The availability of Medigap plans M and N took effect on June 1, 2010, bringing the number of offered plans down to ten from twelve.

Congress passed the bill H.R. 2 on April 14, 2015, which eliminated plans that cover the part B deductible for new Medicare beneficiaries starting January 1, 2020. Those who enrolled into Medicare after this date are not able to purchase plans F or C; however, people who enrolled into Medicare prior to then are still able to purchase plans F or C. Congress believes eliminating first dollar coverage plans will save Medicare money.

In 2020, 58.8 percent of individuals turning 65 and first becoming eligible for Medicare picked Plan G as their Medicare Supplement plan choice. Plan N was the second most-popular choice accounting for 32.8 percent when turning age 65.

== Costs ==
Costs for Medicare Supplement insurance vary widely. The 2020 Medigap Price Index found that someone turning 65 could pay more than three times more for virtually identical coverage. Among the top-10 metro areas, the lowest cost for a male age 65 was $109-per-month available in Dallas, Texas. The highest cost was $509-per-month in Philadelphia, Pennsylvania.

== See also ==
- Health insurance in the United States
