= KFF (health policy organization) =

American non-profit organization

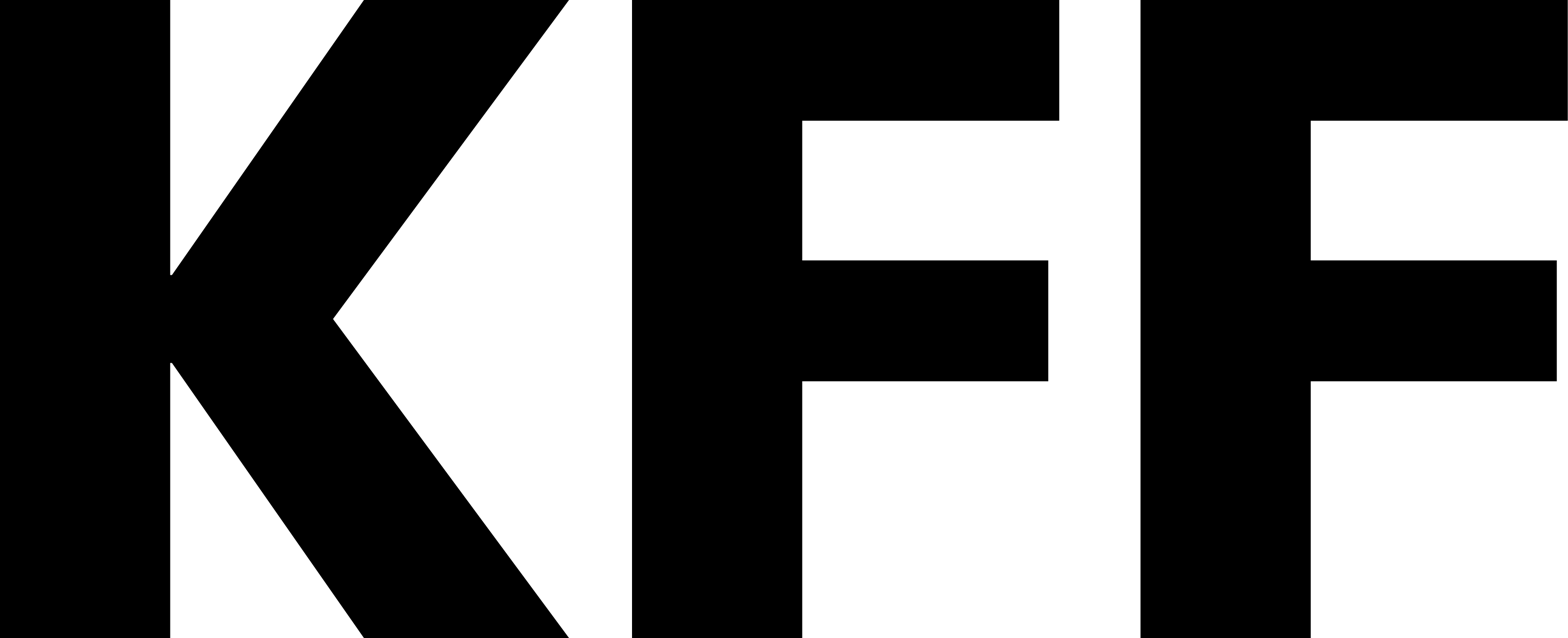
- Formation: December 4, 1947; 78 years ago
- Founder: Henry J. Kaiser
- Type: 501(c)(3)
- Legal status: Public charity
- Purpose: Health care, health policy
- Headquarters: San Francisco, California, U.S.
- Founding President & Chief Executive Officer: Drew Altman
- Net Assets: 618,629,197 USD (2024)
- Revenue: 32,391,992 USD (2024)
- Expenses: 74,774,656 USD (2024)
- Website: www.kff.org

KFF, previously called the The Kaiser Family Foundation or The Henry J. Kaiser Family Foundation, is an American non-profit organization, headquartered in San Francisco, California. KFF is not affiliated with Kaiser Permanente and, since 2019, has been classified by the IRS as a public charity (they were previously a private foundation). KFF states that it is an independent organization focused on health policy. It conducts its own research, polling, and journalism. Its website has been praised for having the "most up-to-date and accurate information on health policy" and as a "must-read for healthcare devotees".

== Current activities ==
=== Policy analysis and polling ===
KFF publishes analysis, polling and journalism about health-care issues, and states that much of its work concerns those who are especially vulnerable to health-care costs, such as those with low incomes, the uninsured, those with chronic illnesses, or Medicaid/Medicare recipients. In addition to domestic U.S. health policy issues, KFF also conducts work on the U.S. role in global health policy.

In 2010, KFF began providing resources for consumers seeking information about the then new health insurance law, the Patient Protection and Affordable Care Act. These resources included a series of animated videos explaining the health law and health insurance terms as well as a calculator for people to estimate what health insurance coverage would cost them.

In early 2020, its analysis and polling focused heavily on the COVID-19 pandemic.

KFF is also well known for public opinion research, documenting the views and experiences of the public on health and related issues – often in partnership with major news organizations, such as The Washington Post and The New York Times.

=== Health news and information ===
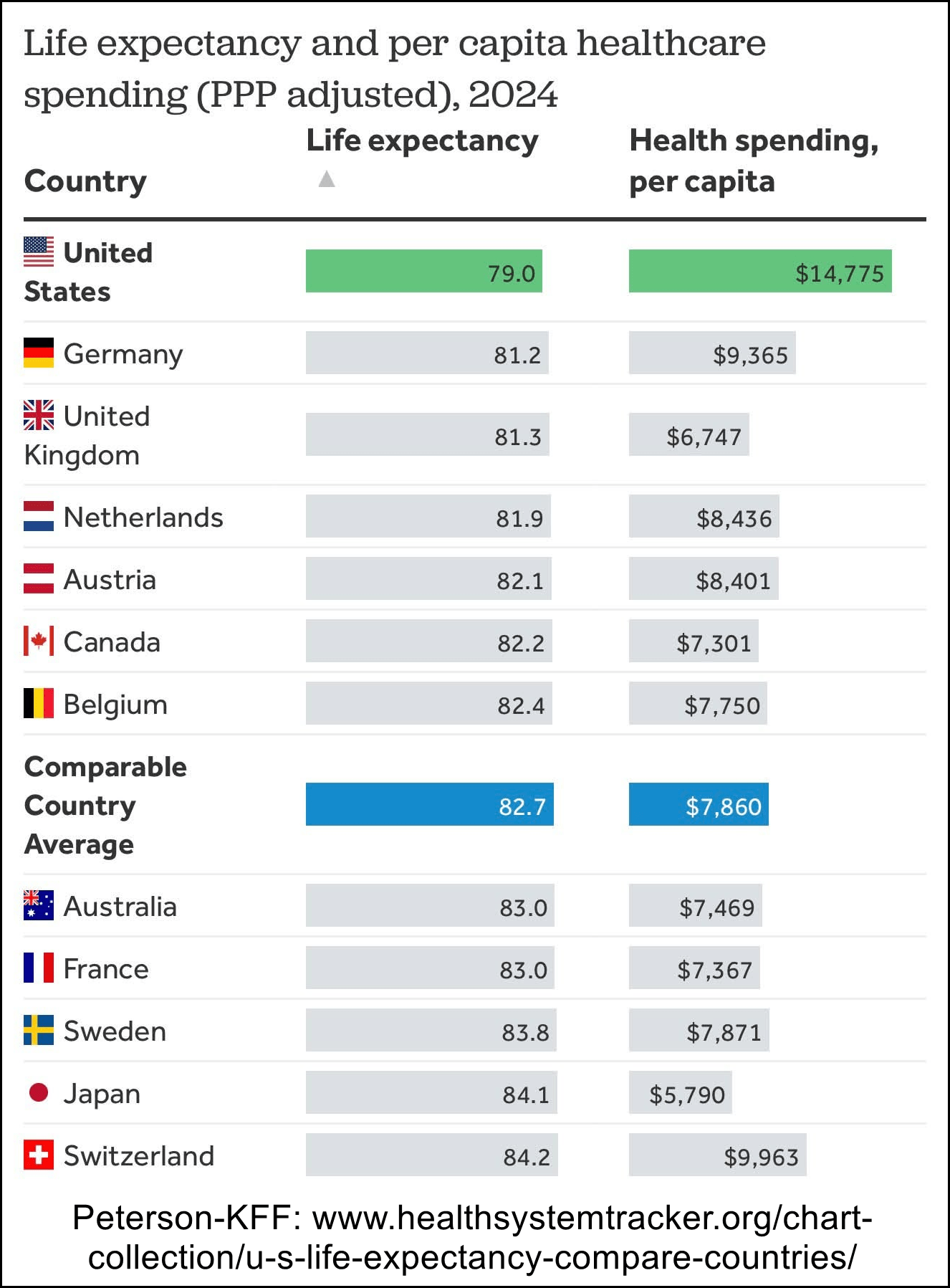
US life expectancy and per capita healthcare spending compared to other wealthy countries. From Peterson-KFF Health System Tracker.

==== KFF Health News ====
As one of the core programs of KFF, KFF Health News focuses on coverage of health care policy and politics. KFF Health News provides coverage of health policy issues and developments at the federal and state levels in the health care marketplace and health care delivery system. It was formerly known as Kaiser Health News (KHN), but was renamed to reflect that it is part of KFF.

In 2020 and 2024, KFF Health News reporters were finalists for a Pulitzer Prize for Investigative Reporting for exposing how the Social Security Administration routinely reduced or suspended monthly checks to take back funds to pay off large debts that were often created by its own miscalculation of people’s benefits, and for exposing predatory bill collection by the University of Virginia Health System that squeezed low-income patients – many into bankruptcy – forcing the non-profit, state-run hospital to change its tactics.

==== Health Information and Trust Initiative ====
In 2023, KFF launched the Health Information and Trust Initiative for tracking health misinformation in the U.S., analyzing its impact on the American people, and mobilizing media to address the problem.

==== Past initiatives ====
KFF formerly sponsored training and site visits for health care reporters.

KFF previously worked with major media and corporate partners, government agencies and health departments, national leadership and community organizations, and other partners to create large-scale public information campaigns on pressing health and social issues, mostly on HIV/AIDS, most notably, the Greater Than HIV, Greater than Covid, and Get Yourself Tested campaigns.

== History ==
KFF was established in 1948 as the Kaiser Family Foundation by Henry J. Kaiser. The organization was set up in Oakland, California, the same city in which Kaiser Permanente's headquarters were located. Later, KFF moved to Sand Hill Road in Menlo Park, about 35 miles away from Oakland. In 2018, it relocated to San Francisco, CA.

When Kaiser died in 1967, his second wife, Alyce Chester, inherited half of his estate, and the other half went to the KFF. Alyce sold all of her holdings, moved far away, and remarried. Mr. Kaiser's children received very little direct inheritance; but did receive authority to run the Kaiser Industries businesses, and the Kaiser Family Foundation.

In 1977, ten years after Kaiser's death, the conglomerate of disparate Kaiser Industries organizations split apart. The Kaiser Family Foundation was initially a major owner of these shares: at the time of dissolution, the foundation owned 32 percent, according to Fortune Magazine.

By 1985, the foundation no longer had an ownership stake in the Kaiser companies and was no longer associated with Kaiser Permanente or Kaiser Industries. KFF is now an independent national organization with a Board of Trustees that have backgrounds in public service, academia, nonprofits, health care, and media.

Starting in September 1990, KFF CEO Drew Altman directed "a complete overhaul of the Foundation's mission and operating style." Altman changed a "sleepy grant-making organization" (some $30 million a year interest on the $400 million endowment), into a leading voice and repository for facts and information on health-care issues, remaking the organization by establishing new programs, recruiting staff, becoming an operating foundation and then later, a public charity.

== Notable members of the board of trustees ==
- Kathleen Sebelius, former U.S. Secretary of Health and Human Services
- Olympia Snowe, former U.S. Senator
- Soledad O'Brien, American journalist
- Kevin Merida, American journalist
