= List of international healthcare accreditation organizations =

This is a list of international healthcare accreditation organizations. These organizations are responsible for the accreditation of hospitals and other healtchcare services. The Joint Commission is one of the most widely used accreditation organizations. The International Society for the Quality in Healthcare (ISQua) is the umbrella organization responsible for accrediting the Joint Commission accreditation scheme in the US and Accreditation Canada International, as well as accreditation organizations in the United Kingdom and Australia. Many countries have either voluntary or mandatory accreditation requirements.

== Organizations ==
The following is a list of hospital accreditation organizations grouped by country:

=== Africa ===
Ministries of health in several sub-Saharan African countries, including Zambia, Uganda, and South African, were reported to have begun planning health system reform including hospital accreditation before 2002. However, most hospitals in Africa are administered by local health ministries or missionary organizations without accreditation programs.

- USAID Applying Science to Strengthen and Improve Systems (ASSIST)
- University Research Company, LLC

=== Algeria ===
- Ministry of Health, Population and Hospital Reform

=== Australia ===
- Australian Council on Healthcare Standards International (ACHSI)
- Australian General Practice Accreditation Limited (AGPAL)
- Australian Commission on Safety and Quality in Health Care (ACSQHC) uses standards developed by the National Safety and Quality Health Service Standards (NSQHS Standards)
- Australian Council for Healthcare Standards International (ACHSI), based in Australia

=== Bosnia ===
- Srpska Agency for Accreditation and Quality, part of the Ministry of Health of Bosnia

=== Brazil ===
- Associação Congregação de Santa Catarina (ACSC), established in 1900

=== Bulgaria ===
- Accreditation Canada (AC), through local representation.

=== Canada ===
- Accreditation Canada (AC), formerly known as Canadian Council on Health Services Accreditation, or CCHSA - based in Canada

=== China ===
- National Health Commission
- National Administration of Traditional Chinese Medicine

=== Denmark ===
- Department of Quality and Accreditation in the Health Service (IKAS)

=== Europe ===
- Organisation of European Cancer Institutes (OECI) Accreditation and Designation Programme (AC)

=== Egypt ===
- General Authority for Healthcare Accreditation and Regulation (GAHAR)

=== Finland ===
- Social and Health Quality Standard (SHQS), ISO 9001, SFS-EN 15224 and ISO 14001 audits and certification by Aurevia.

=== France ===
- Haute Autorité de Santé (HAS), Accreditation mandatory since 1996.

=== Germany ===
- Cooperation for Transparency and Quality in Hospitals (KTQ), accreditation is voluntary

=== India ===
- National Accreditation Board for Hospitals & Healthcare Providers (NABH)
- National Quality Assurance Standards (NQAS)https://qps.nhsrcindia.org/national-quality-assurance-standards

=== Indonesia ===
- Komisi Akreditasi Rumah Sakit (KARS)

=== Japan ===
- Japan Council for Quality Health Care

=== Jordan ===
- Health Care Accreditation Council (HCAC), non-profit established in 2007

=== Kazakhstan ===
- Center for Accreditation for Quality in Healthcar
- Institute of Quality and Accreditation in Healthcare (IQAH)

=== Latin America ===
Brazil, Argentina, and Chile were engaged in a hospital accreditation program in the 1990s in collaboration with PAHO.

- Pan American Health Organization (PAHO)

=== Lithuania ===
- VALSTYBINĖ AKREDITAVIMO SVEIKATOS PRIEŽIŪROS VEIKLAI TARNYBA (English: State Health Care Accreditation Agency) (VASPVT)

=== Malaysia ===
- Malaysian Society for Quality in Health (MSQH)

=== Mexico ===
As of 2009, Mexico signed an agreement with the Joint Commission of Accreditation of Health Care Organizations, now the Joint Commission to adopt U.S. hospital standards for accreditation.

=== Netherlands ===
- Nederlands Instituut voor Accreditatie in de Zorg (NIAZ)

=== New Zealand ===
- The DAA Group provides accreditation to health services in NZ The DAA Group is accredited by the international umbrella organization, the International Society for Quality in Healthcare (ISQua).

=== North Macedonia ===
- Agency for Quality and Accreditation of Health Institutions of the Republic of Northern Macedonia, established in 2013

=== Norway ===
- DNV GL, based in Norway and the United States

=== Peru ===
- Acreditas Global (formerly AAAHC International) has been present in Peru and Costa Rica since 2012.

=== Portugal ===
- Andalusian Agency for Healthcare Quality (ACSA)

=== Romania ===
- National Authority of Quality Management in Health (ANMCS), based in Bucharest, Romania

=== Saudi Arabia ===
- Saudi Central Board for Accreditation of Healthcare Institutions (CBAHI), Riyadh.

=== Serbia ===
- Agency for Accreditation of Health Institutions of Serbia (AZUS), established in 2008

=== South Africa ===
- Office of Health Standards Compliance (OHSC)
- The Council of Health Service Accreditation of Southern Africa

=== South Korea ===
- Korea Institute for Healthcare Accreditation (KOIHA)

=== Taiwan ===
- Taiwan Joint Commission on Hospital Accreditation (財團法人醫院評鑑暨醫療品質策進會) - based in Taipei

=== Thailand ===
- Healthcare Accreditation Institute (Public Organisation), based in Bangkok, Thailand

=== Tonga ===
- Instance National d'Evaluation et de l'Accréditation en Sante (INEAS)

=== Turkey ===
- Standards of Accreditation in Health (SAS), Ministry of Health (Turkey)

=== United Kingdom ===
- QHA Trent Accreditation
- United Kingdom Accreditation Forum (UKAF), responsible for accrediting accreditation schemes in the United Kingdom
- CHKS Ltd is a specialist provider of healthcare accreditation programmes based in the UK and accredited to ISQua and ISO 17021:2011 standards

=== United States ===
Hospital accreditation is required in order to be eligible for Medicare patient coverage.

- Accreditation Commission for Health Care (ACHC) International
- Accreditation Association for Ambulatory Health Care (AAAHC) - based in the United States
- American Accreditation Commission International (AACI) - based in the United States
- Community Health Accreditation Program.
- Global Healthcare Accreditation (GHA)
- Healthcare Facilities Accreditation Program (HFAP)
- Healthcare Quality Association on Accreditation (HQAA)
- Joint Commission also known as Joint Commission International (JCI)
- National Dialysis Accreditation Commission (NDAC)
- The Compliance Team

== See also ==
- Hospital accreditation
- International healthcare accreditation
- Medical ethics
- Lists of hospitals
