= Trent Accreditation Scheme =

The Trent Accreditation Scheme (TAS), now replaced de facto by a number of independent accreditation schemes, such as the QHA Trent Accreditation, was a British accreditation scheme formed with a mission to maintain and continually evaluate standards of quality, especially in health care delivery, through the surveying and accreditation of health care organisations, especially hospitals and clinics, both in the UK and elsewhere in the world.

The Trent UK Accreditation Scheme, or TAS UK, ceased to operate in May 2010, when a majority of Board members decided to end the scheme.

Subsequently, a number of independent accreditation schemes were set up, including the British-based scheme QHA Trent Accreditation.

== History of the scheme ==
The logo of the former Trent Accreditation Scheme

Trent's basic mission resembled that of the USA's Joint Commission International, or JCI, and other major international healthcare accreditation groups, although there were some significant differences in the way the different groups worked.

Apart from hospitals in the United Kingdom, Trent also surveyed a large number of private sector hospitals in Hong Kong. and at the time of its demise had been developing links with hospitals in Cyprus.

The approach Trent took to Clinic and Hospital Accreditation was based on the axiom that no single healthcare system, whether European, American, Asian or otherwise in origin, has the right to claim a monopoly viewpoint over what represents acceptable quality and best clinical practice throughout the world, and no one country has the absolute right to tell another how their hospitals should be run. What is vital is that the quality of care which patients receive should be of the highest possible standard, and also that the hospitals and clinics providing that care should be independently capable when it comes to working out how best to maintain those standards and how best to respond to any new challenges which will inevitably come along. If the overall standards of a hospital or clinic can be shown to be of acceptable quality, then it is desirable, and even ideal, that local differences related to culture and to legislation should be specifically discussed and incorporated into the assessment standards in an appropriate fashion. That said, Trent was very interested in the medical ethical standards of the hospitals it worked with.

To achieve all of this, Trent worked in close partnership with participating hospitals and clinics to generate an appropriate and mutually acceptable set of standards to survey against. Because the world of healthcare is constantly changing, the standards were constantly reviewed and up-dated through a system of working jointly with representatives of partner hospitals.

Trent developed various ways to ensure local participation, and even ownership, over the accreditation process in a locality. Trent utilised UK-sourced surveyors who were either working in the British National Health Service, or NHS, or had retired in recent times, and hence have valuable experience and insight "at the coal face", and in Hong Kong Trent also appoints locally domiciled surveyors (see later). Trent surveyors are drawn from a wide variety of professional backgrounds, but especially from the worlds of medicine, dentistry, nursing, the professions complementary to medicine (e.g. physiotherapy, pharmacy etc.) and healthcare management/administration, so as to ensure an appropriately broad portfolio of knowledge and skills are always present within the surveying teams and the wider organisation. Surveyors were all volunteer professionals rather than salaried employees.

Trent surveys were not just a matter of working through a “tick-list” of standards, a process which Trent believed might elevate standards to a certain level but nevertheless do little to inculcate a culture of “thinking for oneself” – instead, Trent surveys involved direct face-to-face conversation with all levels of staff, including clinical medical staff and senior management (for this reason, qualified medical doctors are included in all surveying teams organised by Trent) and Trent surveyors expected full freedom to go anywhere in the hospital or clinic under survey and to talk to anyone they choose to. Discussion and analysis of the data thus generated, not only by the Trent team but also by the hospital or clinic under survey, represented a major component of Trent's approach to hospital and clinic accreditation, and reflected an underlying philosophy that the whole process was about improving services to patients and the ability of an organisation to work effectively towards that aim.

Trent surveyors evaluated a vast range of modalities of a hospital's (or clinic's) activities and governance, including management, estates, equipment, clinical audit, research, education and training, as well as clinical/medical activity. In Hong Kong hospitals, survey teams always consisted of 2 or 3 surveyors from the UK working together with (usually) 2 based in Hong Kong and who were actively working in the local hospitals. One surveyor will be nominated as the lead. The Hong Kong-based surveyors were nominated by the participating hospitals, and after receiving training they always surveyed hospitals other than their own. This approach led to unrivaled opportunity and potential for the sharing of ideas about best practice between hospitals working in the same locality, and the development of camaraderie. Also, patients were spoken to, and their views and experiences also sought.

At the end of a survey, the key findings were initially presented by the Lead Surveyor to the hospital or clinic undergoing the survey, this event taking place almost always on the last day. The findings were subsequently digested, analysed and put into a more detailed printed report, with positive virtues being highlighted as well as problems. However, because of the end-of-survey oral presentation, hospitals and clinics could start putting remedial action into place as soon as possible.

After a round of surveys, a joint meeting was held at which the printed reports of all the hospital and clinic surveys conducted in that particular round are discussed jointly and in depth by the Trent Board (which had both local and UK representation) together with senior representatives of the hospital or clinic being surveyed, and a decision was then taken as to whether or not accreditation would be granted unconditionally, or if it would be subject to conditions.

The Trent approach to accreditation ensured that the local hospitals and clinics enjoyed some ownership over the whole process, which would not be the case if all of the standards, all of the surveyors and all of the decisions regarding who was successful or not in achieving accreditation were imposed unilaterally from outside. It helped to build up the confidence of participating hospitals in their ability to develop ways to maintain and improve quality in a way that schemes which operate da more didactic approach to standards and their assessment would not. It also meant that there were Trent surveyors constantly present in the majority of the scheme's participating hospitals.

Trent was a member of the United Kingdom Accreditation Forum (UKAF) and an institutional member of ISQUA .

== International Healthcare Accreditation ==
With the advent of medical tourism, international healthcare accreditation has increasingly grown in importance. A number of accreditation organisations sourced from a number of countries fulfil this internationally orientated role, including:

- Accreditation Canada International (formerly "The Canadian Council on Health Services Accreditation", or CCHSA)
- Joint Commission International (JCI), in the United States
- The Australian Council on Healthcare Standards, or ACHS
- QHA Trent Accreditation (UK)

No single accreditation scheme enjoys exclusive rights to be seen as an overall world-wide-relevant scheme, and some hospitals are looking towards multiple accreditation to achieve performance credibility in different parts of the world.

The Trent Scheme was the first accreditation scheme to survey and accredit a hospital in Asia, in Hong Kong in 2000 . Since then others such as JCI have entered the market, with JCI first accrediting Bumrungrad International Hospital in Thailand in 2002.

== Closure of Trent Accreditation Scheme ==
The UK-based Trent Accreditation Scheme (TAS UK) ceased surveying and accreditation activities in 2010. Subsequently, the British-based scheme QHA Trent Accreditation began operating.

== See also ==
- Hospital
- Accreditation
- Hospital Accreditation
- International healthcare accreditation
- Clinical governance
- Clinical audit
- Patient safety
- List of International Healthcare Accreditation Organizations
- Medical Ethics
- Nursing ethics
- Patient safety organization
- Evidence-based medicine
- List of hospitals in Hong Kong
- United Kingdom Accreditation Forum
