= International Patient Safety Goals =

Patient Safety Goals

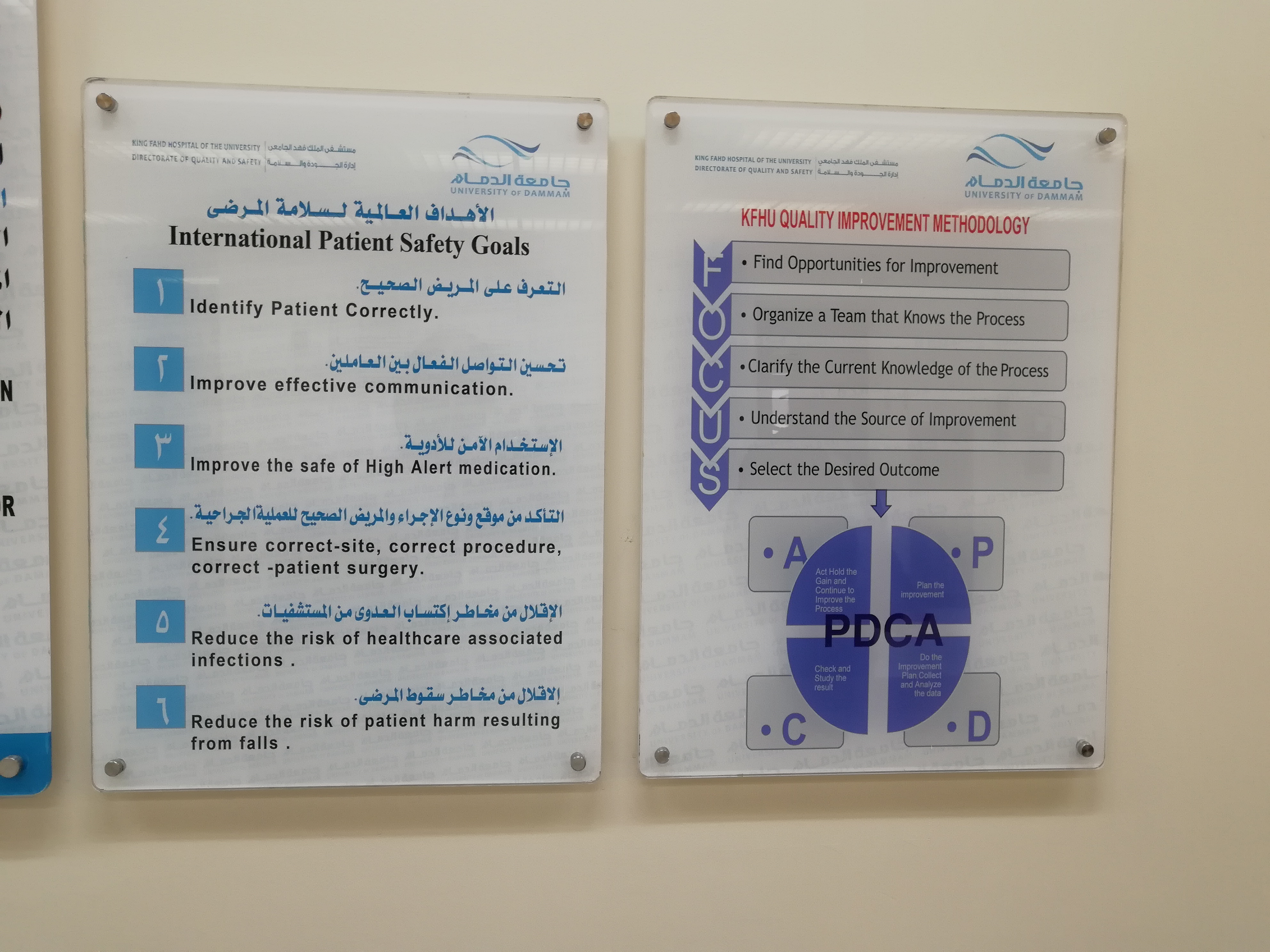
IPSG infographic with Arabic translation in a Saudi hospital.

The International Patient Safety Goals (IPSG) were developed in 2006 by the Joint Commission International (JCI). The goals were adapted from the JCAHO's National Patient Safety Goals.

Compliance with IPSG has been monitored in JCI-accredited hospitals since January 2006. The JCI recommends targeted solution tools to help hospital to meet IPSG standards.

== Versions ==
The Joint Commission has updated the IPSGs over time:

=== 2006 version ===
- Identify patients correctly
- Improve effective communication
- Improve the safety of high-alert medications
- Eliminate wrong-site, wrong-patient, wrong-procedure surgery
- Reduce the risk of health-acquired infections
- Reduce the risk of patient harm from falls.

=== 2011 version ===
- IPSG.1 Identify Patients Correctly
- IPSG.2 Improve Effective Communication
- IPSG.3 Improve the Safety of High-Alert Medications
- IPSG.4 Ensure Correct-Site, Correct-Procedure, Correct-Patient Surgery
- IPSG.5 Reduce the Risk of Health Care–Associated Infections
- IPSG.6 Reduce the Risk of Patient Harm Resulting from Falls.

=== 2017–2023 versions ===
- Goal 1: Identify patients correctly.
- Goal 2: Improve effective communication.
- Goal 3: Improve the safety of high-alert medications.
- Goal 4: Ensure safe surgery.
- Goal 5: Reduce the risk of health care-associated infections.
- Goal 6: Reduce the risk of patient harm resulting from falls.
