= Medicines reconciliation =

Medicines reconciliation or medication reconciliation is the process of ensuring that a hospital patient's medication list is as up-to-date as possible. It is usually undertaken by a pharmacist and may include consulting several sources such as the patient, their relatives or caregivers, or their primary care physician.

In the United Kingdom, guidelines on medicines reconciliation are provided by the National Institute for Health and Care Excellence (NICE) in collaboration with the National Patient Safety Agency. In accordance with these, it should be carried out within 24 hours of admission to hospital. From April 2020 it is to be an essential service in the community pharmacy contract in England.

In the United States, the Joint Commission prioritizes medication reconciliation at hospital admission and during ambulatory care as one of the National Patient Safety Goals.

== Importance ==
Research has shown that, on average, there is around a 20% discrepancy between medications prescribed on admission to hospital and the true medication list for a given patient. Chronic medications are stopped in about 11% of the patients after elective surgeries and 33% of the patients after admission to intensive care unit. The most common omissions are inhalers and analgesia. There are also a small minority of errors in prescribing drugs such as insulin or warfarin, which could have catastrophic consequences including death of the patient. Pharmacist involvement help reasons for drug discontinuation being documented and adverse drug reactions being reconciled in the prescription charts. The value of medicines reconciliation is in noticing and correcting these errors before they have a chance to adversely affect the patient concerned. Research shows that the main activity of medicines reconciliation by pharmacists is to identify or assess drug-related problems and discuss them with other professionals. However, the process and the tools used in medicines reconciliation vary greatly. There is a wide variation in how medicines reconciliation is conducted and which methods are utilized in different country and hospitals.
