= Colin Bradley =

Colin Bradley may refer to:

- Colin Bradley (footballer), Australian rules footballer
- Colin Bradley (physician), professor of general practice
