= Donald Irvine (physician) =

British general practitioner

Sir Donald Irvine CBE
- Portrait by Nick Sinclair, 1996
- Born: 2 June 1935; Newcastle upon Tyne, England
- Died: 19 November 2018 (aged 83)
- Education: King Edward VI Grammar School; Durham University
- Occupation: General practitioner
- Known for: President of the GMC (1995–2002); Revalidation
- Medical career
- Profession: Physician
- Sub-specialties: General practice
- Notable works: The Doctors' Tale: Professionalism and Public Trust (2003)
- Awards: OBE (1979); CBE (1987); Kt (1994); ABMS Healthcare safety award (2017)

Sir Donald Hamilton Irvine CBE (2 June 1935 – 19 November 2018) was a British general practitioner (GP) who was president of the General Medical Council (GMC) between 1995 and 2002, during a time when there were a number of high-profile medical failure cases in the UK, including the Alder Hey organs scandal, the Bristol heart scandal and The Shipman Inquiry. He transformed the culture of the GMC by setting out what patients could expect of doctors and is credited with leading significant changes in the regulation of professional medicine and introducing the policy of professional revalidation in the UK.

Irvine was born in Newcastle upon Tyne, where his father was a sole practitioner GP. After qualifying in medicine and spending some time working with his father, he joined colleagues from two practices to establish a multidisciplinary teaching practice and thereafter followed a career with various committees including as regional adviser in general practice, the Joint Committee on Postgraduate General Practice Training, chair of council of the Royal College of General Practitioners (RCGP) and later the GMC committee on professional standards and ethics. In 1979, he received an OBE, in 1987 a CBE and in 1994 he was Knighted.

In 1999 Irvine's GMC presidency was unsuccessfully challenged by obstetrician Wendy Savage, the first time anyone had stood in opposition to an incumbent president. Irvine won by 30 votes, the GMC agreed to request revalidation and Irvine decided to step down ten months early.

He became internationally known for his work with the Picker Institute and in 2017 was awarded the American Board of Medical Specialties (ABMS) healthcare quality and safety award. He also wrote the books, The Doctors' Tale: Professionalism and Public Trust (2003) and the memoir Medical Professionalism and the Public Interest: Reflections on a Life in Medicine (2017).

== Early life and education ==
Donald Irvine was born on 2 June 1935 in Newcastle upon Tyne, to Andrew Bell Hamilton Irvine and Dorothy Mary Irvine née Buckley. He was brought up in Ashington, Northumberland, a coal mining community, where he travelled to and from school with soot covered miners. His father was a sole practitioner general practitioner (GP) and his home was also the surgery, so his home life revolved around his father's patients. He had one sister who also became a doctor, and they would both go on home visits with their father and help stock the medicines. He later recounted in his memoirs that... "in those days there was a common assumption in medical families that son would follow father".

At the age of ten, during a holiday in Edinburgh, he developed rheumatic fever, and subsequently spent one year of his childhood in hospital, where he was cared for by paediatrician Charles McNeil. He attended The King Edward VI School, Morpeth, and later graduated in medicine from Durham University in 1958. Having contracted rheumatic fever exempted him from National Service.

== Early career ==
After leaving Durham, he completed his house jobs and vocational training, following which he joined his father's practice. Subsequently, he joined colleagues from two other practices to establish the Lintonville Medical Group, the first multidisciplinary teaching practice in the U.K.

His father had been involved in the formation of the RCGP in 1952 and Irvine would soon follow in its philosophy, recognising the need to improve standards in general practice. At that time, a doctor could enter general practice with no requirement for further training and after completing just one year of hospital posts. He was also affected by the poor public perception of general practice in the 1950s, reflected in Winston Churchill's physician, Lord Moran's words in 1958... "that it was the place doctors landed when they fell off the hospital ladder".

Irvine began to take up committee posts, first as regional adviser in general practice and then in the 1970s, as a member of the Merrison Committee of Inquiry into the Regulation of the Medical Profession.

== RCGP ==
In his mid-thirties, and having also academically achieved a DObst in 1960, an MD from Newcastle in 1964 and a FRCGP in 1972, he was the third person to be appointed honorary secretary of the council of the College, serving for seven years before stepping down in 1978. It gave him the foundation from which he could plan to raise the profile of general practice.

During his term he contributed to the College's evidence to the Royal Commission and to the central organisation of the three-year GP vocational training, organised on a regional basis, which provided training practices and a curriculum. He continued as one of two secretarys for the RCGP led Joint Committee on Postgraduate General Practice Training, with Irvine as its lead. Recognising the poor standards in general practice, he led a study that included most of the northern region GPs and hospital paediatricians. He demonstrated that setting standards for children was feasible.

Between 1982 and 1985, he served as the chairman of the RCGP council, where he introduced the "quality initiative" which encouraged GPs to assess their day-to-day care in their own practices. In 1979 he became the first RCGP nominee to the GMC.

== GMC and medical regulation ==
Irvine chaired the GMC committee on professional standards and ethics and has been credited for his drive "to make medical regulation in the UK more patient centred". His actions also resulted in a publication titled Good Medical Practice and Duties of a Doctor and a shift from "telling doctors what they should not do, to one which told them what they should do". It transformed the culture of the GMC by setting out what patients could expect from doctors.

In 1995, shortly after being knighted, and with the concern over the GMC's disciplinary procedures and having the job of implementing performance procedures, he was elected president of the GMC, the first ever GP to hold the office. It was an appointment that he kept until stepping down in 2002.

In the 1990s, a number of high-profile cases of medical failures had come to public attention during his tenure and had unsettling relations between doctors and their patients. His first role as president was to chair the conduct committee that handled the Bristol heart scandal, where a whistleblower disclosed poor heart surgery outcomes in children. In 1998, two months into the Bristol inquiry, as its chairman, he commented... "we are not dealing with statistics here, we are talking about children". On 18 June 1998 at a disciplinary hearing, Irvine told two paediatric heart surgeons and the chief executive of the United Bristol National Health Service (NHS) Trust, that they were guilty of serious professional misconduct. Subsequently, restoring public trust became an issue. Feeling that Bristol had exposed a medical "club culture", he lobbied for the reform of professional medical regulation.

It was a difficult time for the medical profession and after the Bristol case and its subsequent public inquiry led by Sir Ian Kennedy, he faced further medical scandals, including the Alder Hey organs scandal and the case of Harold Shipman. He set out to define what good practice should be, focussing on protecting patients, and clarified that it was not justifiable to blame these scandals on individuals, but there needed to be acknowledgement of "inherent cultural flaws in the medical profession"..."excessive paternalism"...and a "lack of respect for patients" resulting in "secrecy and complacency about poor practice".

He pushed for "revalidation", a five-yearly assessment of doctors' fitness to practise, which was later introduced in 2012. This chief achievement as president of the GMC of introducing the policy of professional revalidation was a term he coined to show how doctors would keep up to date with medical knowledge and skills, and he is credited with turning the GMC's philosophy from one of protecting doctors to that of protecting patients.

In 1999 Irvine's presidency was unsuccessfully challenged by obstetrician Wendy Savage, the first time anyone had stood in opposition of an incumbent president. Savage gained 26 votes, whereas Irvine gained 56. The GMC finally agreed to ask the government for legislation to introduce revalidation, and subsequently Irvine stepped down 10 months early in 2002. The legacy of his presidency became the refocusing of the GMC's purpose on protecting patients and the public. Irvine, however, later described the year 2000 as "annus horribilis" for the GMC. Many of the previous presidents had been elevated to the House of Lords and as he recorded in his memoirs of 2003, his presidency years were not happy ones.

Denis Pereira Gray later stated that it "was a remarkable achievement to get the GMC to vote for revalidation".

== Later ==
In 2003, Irvine described "partnerships with patients, and accountability rather than professional autonomy ... teamwork rather than individualism, collective as well as personal responsibility, transparency rather than secrecy, empathetic communication and above all respect for others".

In his communication to the GMC Committee (2010–2011 committee), he..."recommended that the committee view the processes of revalidation and fitness to practice as one system that aims to ensure public protection".

He became internationally known following his work with the Picker Institute. He was their patron and chair of the board of trustees from 2001 to 2013.

== Awards and honours ==
In 2017 he was awarded the American Board of Medical Specialties (ABMS) healthcare quality and safety award.

In 1979, he received an OBE, in 1987 a CBE and in 1994 he was Knighted in the 1994 New Year Honours Lists. Seven universities awarded him honorary doctorates. In 1998, he was an inaugural Fellow of the Academy of Medical Sciences.

== Personal and family ==
As well as his interest in aviation, he maintained an interest in ornithology and was able to recognise a bird from listening to its song. He was also interested in gardening.

In 1960, he married Margaret McGuckin, with whom he had two sons and one daughter. They divorced in 1983. He then married Sally Fountain in 1986 and divorced in 2004. In 2007, he married nurse Cynthia Rickitt, who cared for him during his final two years of illness with heart and kidney failure.

He died at his home on 19 November 2018.

== Publications ==
In 2003, one year after stepping down from the GMC, he published The Doctors' Tale: Professionalism and Public Trust. In this account, he highlighted the importance of role models, his concern over the influence of hospital consultants and the standing of the British Medical Association.

He published his memoirs in Medical Professionalism and the Public Interest: Reflections on a Life in Medicine, which was reviewed and recommended by Denis Pereira Gray to all physicians who look to leadership roles, to patients, medical historians and to health policymakers.

=== Selected publications ===
==== Articles ====
- "William Pickles Lecture 1975. 1984: the quiet revolution?" (PDF). The Journal of the Royal College of General Practitioners. 25 (155): 399–407. 1975.
- Irvine, DH (1990). "Standards in general practice: the quality initiative revisited". Br J Gen Pract. 40: 75–7. PMC 1371147. PMID 2107857.
- "General practice in the 1990s: a personal view on future developments". British Journal of General Practice. 43 (368): 121–125. 1993.
- Irvine, Donald (1999). "The performance of doctors: the new professionalism". The Lancet. 353: 1174–1177. doi:10.1016/S0140-6736(99)91160-1.
- Irvine, Donald (2006). "Good doctors: safer patients–-the Chief Medical Officer's prescription for regulating doctors". Journal of the Royal Society of Medicine. 99: 430–432. doi:10.1177/014107680609900902. PMC 1557883.
- Irvine, Donald (2006). "A short history of the General Medical Council". Medical Education. 40: 202–211. doi:10.1111/j.1365-2929.2006.02397.x.

==== Books ====
- The Doctors' Tale: Professionalism and Public Trust, Radcliffe Medical Press (2003), ISBN 185775977X
- Medical Professionalism and the Public Interest: Reflections on a Life in Medicine, RCGP Heritage Committee (2017), ISBN 9781389188404.

==== Book chapters ====
- "Approaches to Quality Improvementin the British National Health Service", co-authored with Liam Donaldson, in The Epidemiology of Quality by Vahé A. Kazandjian and Elizabeth Sternberg, An Aspen Publication (1995), ISBN 0834205335
- "Problem Doctors in the UK: Role of the General Medical Council", in Problem Doctors: A Conspiracy of Silence edited by Peter Lens and G. A. van der Wal, IOS Press (1997), ISBN 9051992874
- "Professionalism and Professional Regulation", in Medical Education and Training: From Theory to Delivery edited by Yvonne Carter and Neil Jackson, Oxford University Press (2009), ISBN 9780199234219
