= UKAF =

UKAF may refer to:

- Ukrainian Air Force, the aerial warfare service branch of the armed forces of Ukraine
- United Kingdom Accreditation Forum, a British network of healthcare accreditation organizations

== See also ==
- Royal Air Force, United Kingdom's air force
