= Emergency Medical Treatment and Active Labor Act =

Act of Congress in the United States

- Acronyms (colloquial): EMTALA

Legislative history
- Signed into law by President Ronald Reagan on April 7, 1986

United States Supreme Court cases
- Moyle v. United States, No. 23-726, 603 U.S. ___ (2024)

The Emergency Medical Treatment and Active Labor Act (EMTALA) is an act of the 99th United States Congress, enacted in 1986 as part of the Consolidated Omnibus Budget Reconciliation Act (COBRA). It requires hospital emergency departments that accept payments from Medicare to provide an appropriate medical screening examination (MSE) for anyone seeking treatment for a medical condition regardless of citizenship, legal status, or ability to pay. Participating hospitals may not transfer or discharge patients needing emergency treatment except with the informed consent or stabilization of the patient or when the patient's condition requires transfer to a hospital better equipped to administer the treatment.

EMTALA applies to "participating hospitals," which the statute defines as those that accept payment from the Department of Health and Human Services' Centers for Medicare and Medicaid Services (CMS) under the Medicare program. Because there are very few hospitals that do not accept Medicare, the law applies to nearly all hospitals. The combined payments of Medicare and Medicaid, $602 billion in 2004, or roughly 44% of all medical expenditures in the United States, make not participating in EMTALA impractical for nearly all hospitals. EMTALA's provisions apply to all patients, not just to Medicare patients.

The cost of emergency care required by EMTALA is not covered directly by the federal government, so it has been characterized as an unfunded mandate. In 2009, uncompensated care represented 55% of emergency room care and 6% of total hospital costs.

== Prior legislation ==
The Hill-Burton Act of 1946, which provided federal assistance for the construction of community hospitals, established nondiscrimination requirements for institutions that received such federal assistance—including the requirement that a "reasonable volume" of free emergency care be provided for community members who could not pay—for a period for 20 years after the hospital's construction. Amendments to the act in 1975 removed the 20-year expiration date and instead required hospitals receiving Hill-Burton funding to provide free care in perpetuity. However, the provisions of the act were vague and rarely enforced.

== Mandated and non-mandated care ==
Congress passed EMTALA to eliminate the practice of "patient dumping"—that is, refusal to treat people because of inability to pay or insufficient insurance or transferring or discharging emergency patients on the basis of high anticipated diagnosis and treatment costs. The law applies when an individual seeks treatment for a medical condition "or a request is made on the individual's behalf for examination or treatment for that medical condition."

The U.S. government defines an emergency department as "a specially equipped and staffed area of the hospital used a significant portion of the time for initial evaluation and treatment of outpatients for emergency medical conditions." That means, for example, that outpatient clinics not equipped to handle medical emergencies are not obligated under EMTALA and can simply refer patients to a nearby emergency department for care.

An emergency medical condition (EMC) is defined as "a condition manifesting itself by acute symptoms of sufficient severity (including severe pain) such that the absence of immediate medical attention could reasonably be expected to result in placing the individual's health [or the health of an unborn child] in serious jeopardy, serious impairment to bodily functions, or serious dysfunction of bodily organs." For example, a pregnant woman with an emergency condition or currently in labor must be treated until delivery is complete, until the woman and the fetus are stabilized, or until qualified personnel identify the labor as a "false labor" or Braxton Hicks contractions, unless a transfer under the statute is appropriate.

Patients treated under EMTALA may not be able to pay or have insurance or other programs pay for the associated costs but are legally responsible for any costs incurred as a result of their care under civil law.

=== Non-covered medical conditions ===
Contrary to the common misconception that if a person is ill, they will be treated regardless of their ability to pay, not all medical conditions qualify for uncompensated mandated services required by EMTALA.

The sole purpose of the EMTALA-mandated MSE is to require emergency departments to make a determination about whether an emergency medical condition does or does not exist, using their normal assessment and diagnostic protocols. Because the MSE is a mandated EMTALA service, health insurers are required to cover benefits for their subscribers. They are also required to cover EMTALA-mandated services necessary to stabilize individuals determined to have an EMC.

EMTALA intentionally omitted requirements that hospitals provide uncompensated stabilizing treatment for individuals with medical conditions determined not to be EMCs. Therefore, such individuals are not eligible for further uncompensated examination and treatment beyond the MSE.

A significant portion of emergency department visits are considered not to be EMCs as defined by EMTALA. The medical profession refers to such cases as "non-emergent." Regardless, the term is not recognized by law as a condition defined by the EMTALA statute. A term more relevant for compliance with EMTALA is "non-emergency medical condition." If the "non-emergent" term is used in the context of EMTALA, it must be defined as a medical condition that fails to pass the criteria for determination of being a true EMC as defined by the EMTALA statute.

Admitted patients who experience a medical emergency while at a hospital are normally not covered by EMTALA but are instead protected by varying state laws and quality assurance under the deemed status of the facility.

== Hospital obligations ==
Hospitals have three obligations under EMTALA:

1. An individual requesting emergency care or one for whom a representative has made a request if the patient is unable to do so must receive a medical screening examination (MSE) to determine whether an emergency medical condition (EMC) exists. The participating hospital cannot delay examination and treatment to inquire about methods of payment, insurance coverage, or a patient's citizenship or legal status. The hospital may start the process of payment inquiry and billing only once it has ensured that doing so will not interfere with or otherwise compromise patient care.
2. When an emergency department determines that an individual has an EMC, the hospital must provide further treatment and examination until the EMC is resolved or stabilized and the patient can provide self-care after discharge or, if unable to do so, can receive needed continual care. Inpatient care provided must be at an equal level for all patients regardless of ability to pay. Hospitals cannot discharge a patient prior to stabilization if the patient's insurance is canceled or if the patient otherwise discontinues payment during the course of stay.
3. If the hospital does not have the capability to treat the condition, the hospital must make an "appropriate" transfer of the patient to another hospital with such capability. That includes long-term-care or rehabilitation facilities for patients unable to provide self-care. Hospitals with specialized capabilities must accept such transfers and may not discharge a patient until the condition is resolved and the patient is able to provide self-care or is transferred to another facility. A hospital has no obligation under EMTALA to provide uncompensated services beyond the screening exam unless it determines that the patient has an EMC.

== Amendments ==
Since the act's original passage, Congress has passed several amendments to the act. Additionally, state and local laws in some places have imposed further requirements on hospitals. The amendments include the following:

- A patient is defined as "stable," therefore ending a hospital's EMTALA obligations, in these circumstances:
  - The patient is conscious, alert, and oriented.
  - The cause of all symptoms reported by the patient or representative and all potentially life-threatening, limb-threatening, or organ-threatening symptoms discovered by hospital staff have been ascertained to the best of the hospital's ability.
  - Any conditions that are immediately life-threatening, limb-threatening, or organ-threatening have been treated to the best of the hospital's ability to ensure the patient does not need further, inpatient care.
- All patients have EMTALA rights equally regardless of age, race, religion, nationality, ethnicity, residence, citizenship, or legal status. If a patient's status is found to be illegal, hospitals may not discharge the patient prior to completion of care, but law enforcement and hospital security may take necessary actions to prevent a patient from escaping or harming others. Treatment may be delayed as needed only to prevent patients from harming themselves or others.
- Overloaded hospitals may not discharge a patient unable to pay so they can make room for a patient who is able to pay or is otherwise viewed by society as a more-valued citizen. If the emergency department is overloaded, patients must be treated in an order based on their determined medical needs, not their ability to pay.
- Hospitals may not deny or provide substandard services for a patient who already has outstanding debt to the hospital and may not withhold the patient's belongings, records, or other required services until the patient pays.
- Hospitals and related services cannot receive a judgment against the patient in court filings made more than 36 months after the date the patient was discharged or the last partial payment the patient made to the hospital, contractor, or agent. After that period, the patient may not be threatened with legal action if payment is not made and may not be denied future outpatient services from the same company or agency that a patient is able to pay.
- If a patient has been awarded monetary damages against a hospital or any related or affiliated services by a court of law or has settled out of court on damages, the hospital and related or affiliated services may neither withhold money for lack of payment nor count the money toward the bill in lieu of making payment to the patient. Voluntary consent for such an arrangement is permitted only if initiated by the patient. A hospital may not threaten or coerce a patient into such a settlement or mislead the patient into believing such an arrangement is required or recommended.
- Patients cannot face criminal prosecution for failure to pay even if the patients become aware of inability to pay the hospital. Hospitals and third-party agents may not threaten patients with prosecution as a means of scaring patients into making payment. Patients can be prosecuted under existing federal, state, or local laws for providing false names, addresses, or other information to avoid payment, to avoid receiving bills, or to hide fugitive status.
- A hospital cannot delay treatment while determining whether a patient can pay or is insured, but that does not mean the hospital is completely forbidden from asking for or running a credit check. If a patient fails to pay the bill, the hospital can sue the patient, and the unsatisfied judgment will likely appear on the patient's credit report. A third-party collector for a hospital bill would be covered under the Fair Debt Collection Practices Act.
- Hospitals are prohibited from discriminating against or providing substandard care for patients who appear impoverished or homeless, are not well-dressed or well-groomed, or exhibit signs of mental illness or intoxication. If the hospital fears that a patient may be a threat to others, the hospital may delay care only as necessary to protect others.
- Hospitals are required to sufficiently feed patients unable to pay at a level equal to those able to pay and must meet all physician-ordered dietary restrictions.
- Hospitals are not required to provide premium services for a patient that are not related to medical care (such as television) when failure to provide that service does not compromise patient care.
- Hospitals and affiliated clinics may avoid providing continued outpatient care, drugs, or other supplies after discharge. If such services are recommended but a patient is unable to pay, the hospital is required to refer the patient to a clinic or tax-funded or private program that enables the patient to pay for such services and to which the patient has reasonable access. Hospitals must reasonably assist a patient as necessary to obtain such services by providing information as the patient requests.

== Effects ==
=== Improved health services for uninsured patients ===
The most significant effect is that regardless of insurance status, participating hospitals are prohibited from denying an MSE of individuals seeking treatment for medical conditions. Currently, EMTALA requires only that hospitals stabilize the EMC. According to some analyses of the U.S. health care social safety net, EMTALA is an incomplete and strained program.

=== Cost pressures on hospitals ===
When medical bills go unpaid, health care providers must either shift the costs onto those who can pay or go uncompensated. In the first decade of EMTALA, such cost shifting amounted to a hidden tax levied by providers. For example, it has been estimated that cost shifting has amounted to $455 per individual, or $1,186 per family, in California annually.

However, because of the recent influence of managed care and other cost control initiatives by insurance companies, hospitals are less able to shift costs, and they end up writing off more and more in uncompensated care. The amount of uncompensated care delivered by nonfederal community hospitals grew from $6.1 billion in 1983 to $40.7 billion in 2004, according to a 2004 report from the Kaiser Commission on Medicaid and the Uninsured, but it is unclear what percentage of the amount was emergency care and therefore attributable to EMTALA.

Financial pressures on hospitals in the 20 years since EMTALA's passage have caused hospitals to consolidate or close facilities, thereby contributing to emergency department overcrowding. According to the Institute of Medicine, from 1993 to 2003, emergency department visits in the United States grew by 26 percent, while in the same period, the number of emergency departments declined by 425. Ambulances frequently get diverted from overcrowded emergency departments to other hospitals that may be farther away. In 2003, ambulances got diverted more than half a million times—not necessarily due to patients' inability to pay.

=== Emergency abortions ===
After Roe v. Wade (1973) was overturned in June 2022, transforming the legal landscape for abortion in the United States, the HHS issued guidance on EMTALA protections for clinicians that apply regardless of state laws. According to the guidance, which does not change policy, EMTALA, as a federal law, supersedes state laws that ban abortion. So, doctors who perform emergency abortions to stabilize a patient are protected by EMTALA. Hospitals that fail to do so could face fines or be booted from Medicare. The guidance also says EMTALA does not prevent a doctor from being sued, though EMTALA may be used in defense of the doctor in state court actions.

The Biden administration filed a motion in federal court to block Idaho's enforcement of that state's abortion ban in cases in which EMTALA applied. The judge ruled against the state and ordered Idaho's law suspended in emergency cases. Idaho appealed the ruling, arguing that the federal government “cannot use EMTALA to override in the emergency room state laws about abortion any more than it can use it to override state law on organ transplants or marijuana use.” The Supreme Court agreed to hear Idaho's challenge to that interpretation of the law in Moyle v. United States (2024), which was argued that April.

Texas sued the federal government, winning in federal court. A 5th Circuit judge preliminarily enjoined the Biden administration's EMTALA guidance in Texas.

In June 2024, the Supreme Court issued a 6–3 ruling in Moyle which reinstated the lower court ruling requiring EMTALA's emergency abortion provision to be enforced in Idaho. However, the issue remains unresolved, with the ruling only seen as delaying the Idaho state law banning emergency abortions rather than striking it down altogether. However, the Supreme Court ruling did allow for the case to return to a lower court which was previously favorable to upholding EMTALA's emergency abortion provision.

In 2025, as part of the second Trump administration's abortion policy, the Centers for Medicare & Medicaid Services rescinded guidance requiring that hospitals provide emergency abortions under EMTALA.

== See also ==
- Health care in the United States
