= Significant event audit =

A significant event audit (SEA), also known as significant event analysis, is a method of formally assessing significant events, particularly in primary care in the UK, with a view to improving patient care and services. To be effective, the SEA frequently seeks contributions from all members of the healthcare team and involves a subsequent discussion to answer why the occurrence happened and what lessons can be learned. Events triggering a SEA can be diverse, include both adverse and critical events, as well as good practice. It is most frequently required for appraisal, revalidation and continuing professional development.

== Definition ==
The concept of SEA was established with the aid of Mike Pringle's occasional paper on the topic in 1995, where, he defined SEA as;

a process in which individual episodes are analysed, in a systematic and detailed way to ascertain what can be learnt about the overall quality of care, and to indicate changes that might lead to improvements.

It does not necessarily involve an undesirable outcome and can reflect good or bad practice. The Medical Defence Union (MDU) defines SEA as "a way of formally analysing incidents with implications for patient care in order to improve services". For the purposes of appraisal and revalidation a SEA is "any unintended or unexpected event, which could or did lead to harm". This is reflected in the General Medical Council's (GMC) definition which is not the same as that frequently used in primary care. The GMC describe a SEA as;

an untoward or critical incident...which...is any unintended or unexpected event, which could or did lead to harm of one or more patients. This includes incidents which did not cause harm but could have done, or where the event should have been prevented.

=== Synonyms ===
SEA may also be referred to as a serious untoward incident, patient safety incident, critical event audit, critical incident analysis, structured case analysis or facilitated case discussion.

== Use ==
SEA is mainly a concept from the UK, where team members come together to constructively review an event that has occurred, broadly equating to doing a case study. It is preferentially used in primary care situations and has some comparisons with root cause analysis. It is most frequently required for appraisal, revalidation and continuing professional development, and unlike clinical audit, SEA is qualitative and considered as a form of quality improvement activity, as events of SEA in primary care frequently do not meet the harm threshold.

It can also be used as part of a GP trainee's learning log. The value of using SEA was highlighted in the publication of the GP contract of 2004, and became part of the GP contract in the UK, with practices requiring to have completed 12 SEAs every three years.

SEA as a risk management technique is endorsed by the National Patient Safety Agency.

== Events ==
Events triggering a SEA can be diverse, include both adverse and critical events, as well as good practice, and are a structured way of reviewing an occurrence that caused harm, a near miss or an identified risk, or a reason for celebration. With the aim of being a positive development, it can cover clinical as well as administrative areas.

Examples could include:

=== Prevention ===
- childhood infection cases
- diagnosis of a new cancer
- unplanned pregnancy
- underage pregnancy
- new heart attack
- new stroke
- osteoporotic fracture
- avoidable admission to hospital
- seizure
- sudden unexpected death or hospital admission
- registering a diabetic person with sight impairment.

=== Service ===
- complaints
- compliments
- confidentiality issue
- confusion between patient names
- a staffing problem

=== Administration ===
- missing medical information
- waiting times
- referral not sent
- missed home visit
- unactioned request

=== Risk Management ===
- adverse drug reactions
- monitoring medications e.g. warfarin
- violent attack on staff
- anger outburst

== Aims ==
- To identify individual events whether beneficial or detrimental and to improve the quality of patient care from the lessons learnt.
- To encourage openness, rather than blame or self-criticism.
- To encourage team-building.
- To identify good practice, in addition to poor practice.
- To be useful for continuing professional development.
- To share SEA between teams within the NHS.

A timeline of the SEA is assembled with the facts gathered via medical records and personal accounts and interviews. This can then be further analysed.

== The meeting ==
The SEA is frequently set as an agenda item within a wider group meeting, but a separate meeting may also be arranged ad hoc if necessary. Attendees usually comprise a few or a number from the following;

- GPs
- practice manager
- nurses – practice and/or community
- receptionists
- secretaries
- allied health professions
- patients, carers

In the meeting, those involved in the event present what happened in the case, followed by questioning and a group discussion about how the situation was dealt with. Actions and a follow-up meeting may be necessary with agreement and the process is recorded as a summary. The SEA is then documented on a form which is frequently bespoke to the practice.

	Significant Event Audit Template
Title	
Date of event	
Date of SEA meeting	
SEA lead(s)	
Team members present	
What happened?	Detailed description of what actually happened.
Why did it happen?	Contributing factors as to why the event happened.
What has been learned?	Demonstrate reflection and learning.
What has been changed?	Agreed action and show how it is implemented.

== Outcomes ==
The discussion may lead to a number of outcomes including;

- Celebration
- Immediate change
- Audit
- No action
- A review of the literature or guidelines and report back
- A root cause analysis and report back

There is no fixed end point, hence outcomes can be re-evaluated at predetermined intervals.

== Reporting ==
External agencies that may require access to SEA documents include patients and carers, GP appraisers, clinical governance committees, clinical commissioning groups (CCGs) and the (GMC.

GPs are now encouraged to report and share SEAs via their local CCG clinical governance. Other reporting systems include the Medicines and Healthcare products Regulatory Agency's (MHRA) Yellow Card Scheme for adverse medical events.

== Difficulties ==
Restrictions due to the time needed to perform SEA may cause difficulty in going through the process. Other restrictions may include resistance to honesty, the process being emotionally demanding and uncomfortable, and lack of motivation. Leadership and group dynamics may vary and there may be conflicts of interest between staff.

== History ==
The method of SEA, focusing on the team rather than the individual, is founded on the critical incident technique, developed during the Second World War by aviation psychologist John C. Flanagan, to identify successful and adverse aspects of "combat leadership". Its application now extends to business, organisational psychology, education and healthcare.

Within the NHS, seriously untoward events were analysed via a number of methods including grand rounds, clinico-pathology meetings and confidential enquiries.

In 1995, two general practitioners, Mike Pringle and Colin Bradley, published a "groundbreaking" paper on SEA. They helped instigate and develop SEA into primary care in the UK. Following the publication of A First Class Service, clinical governance was established in April 1999, and subsequently two more documents further promoted SEA as a way of delivering clinical governance.
