= Medical tourism agent =

Organisation matching patients to clinics

A medical tourism agent (also health tourism provider or medical tourism provider) is an organisation or a company which seeks to bring together a prospective patient with a service provider, usually a hospital or a clinic. These organisations are generally facilitators and developers of medical tourism, which brings into play a number of issues that do not apply when a patient stays within their own country of origin.

Some of these organisations and companies specialise in certain areas of healthcare, such as cosmetic surgery, dentistry or transplant surgery, while others are more generalised in their approach, providing multiple services over a wide range of medical specialities. These organisations may also focus on providing services in a single country or they may provide access to treatment across multiple nations.

Medical quality standards vary around the world, and international accreditation is relatively new. For these reasons, potential clients may face unknowns and risks related to quality, safety and ethics. Medical tourists look to health tourism providers to provide information about quality, safety and legal issues, but the quality of such information and services varies on the size, scale and the standards of the facilitators themselves.

== Practices ==
Medical tourism or health tourism providers assist travellers in planning their medical travel. They offer complete information on medical facilities, service providers, medical professionals, travel agencies, resorts, medical/travel insurance overseas as well as of local areas. Some medical tourism providers also coordinate non-medical aspects of the journey, including flight arrangements, accommodation, transportation and translation services. Millions of medical travellers travel overseas for their medical, dental, and cosmetic procedures.

Health tourism providers make information available about the hospitals, clinic and the doctors that they are partnered with, but the nature, extent and quality of the information provided by different organisations and companies working in this field varies enormously. Hospital quality indicators can include whether they have been subjected to independent international healthcare accreditation, practice evidence-based medicine, and good governance, and whether independent health care staff, particularly the doctors providing the services, have been subjected to independent credentialing, as well as evidence that the doctors maintain and improve their personal professional standards.

In addition, there are a number of non-medical angles which receive varying degrees of attention by providers. These include:

- Availability of techniques (e.g. new operations, new approaches to infertility, new imaging techniques)
- Ethics (for example, see Organ harvesting in China)
- Hotels
- Language issues
- Medico-legal issues (e.g. are the doctors providing the treatment adequately indemnified or carrying personal malpractice insurance? Is the hospital itself adequately insured? Can a patient sue if things go wrong? Will the hospital repatriate the body of a patient who dies on the operating table ?)
- Non-medical risks involved
- Pre-travel health issues, such as antimalarial therapy (e.g. for Thailand) and relevant immunisations (e.g. typhoid and hepatitis A are recommended for travelling to Turkey or the Philippines)
- Prices and how to pay

In 2006 the group CEO of Bumrungrad Hospital in Thailand, stated "If there's a mistake, we fix it..... But the idea of suing for multimillions of dollars for damages is not going to be something you can do outside the U.S." However, Americans and Europeans going overseas as medical tourists may not be able to take effective legal action if they are dissatisfied with their experience. The Medical Protection Society, a British group, is responsible for indemnifying doctors in many countries, including Singapore, Hong Kong, Malaysia and Brunei, which increases the level of protection enjoyed both by patients locally as well as those coming in as medical tourists. This service is not free.

There are many good hospitals and there is absolutely no reason to make it unsafe. The problem is that many prospective patients treat medical tourism the same way as online shopping. In a surgery, cheaper is not always better. Mr. Bob Talasila, the president of American medical tourism company World Medical and Surgical LLC echo the same feelings.

== Standards ==
While hospitals providing medical tourism services may be subject to international accreditation by a reputable independent international group, there is currently no official organization responsible for accrediting health tourism providers or ensuring operating standards are safe and ethical. The Medical Tourism Association promotes their guidelines as a potential standard, and encourages membership to establish themselves as reputable.

== See also ==
- Evidence-based medicine
- Hospital accreditation
- International healthcare accreditation
- Medical tourism
- Quality assurance
