= Hospital accreditation =

Assessment of healthcare institutions

Hospital accreditation has been defined as “A self-assessment and external peer assessment process used by health care organizations to accurately assess their level of performance in relation to established standards and to implement ways to continuously improve”. Critically, accreditation is about standard-setting and the analytical, counseling and self-improvement dimensions to the process. There are parallel issues in evidence-based medicine, quality assurance and medical ethics (see below), and the reduction of medical error is a key role of the accreditation process. Hospital accreditation is therefore one component in the maintenance of patient safety. However, there is limited and contested evidence supporting the effectiveness of accreditation programs.

== Background ==
Hospitals and healthcare services are components of society particularly prone to being the recipients of societal resources. Hospitals are typically places of safety for patients, the staff, and the general public. Quality of hospitals and healthcare services is of great interest to many other bodies, including governments, NGOs targeting healthcare and social welfare, professional organizations representing doctors, patient organizations, and shareholders of companies providing healthcare services. Accreditation schemes are not the same thing as government-controlled initiatives set up to assess healthcare providers with only governmental objectives in mind - typically, the functioning and finance of hospital accreditation schemes should be independent of governmental control.

How quality is maintained and improved in hospitals and healthcare services is the subject of much debate. Hospital surveying and accreditation is one recognised means by which this can be achieved.

It is not just an issue of hospital quality. There are financial factors as well. For example, in the USA, up until recently the Joint Commission exercised a de facto veto over whether or not US hospitals and other health providers were able to participate, and therefore earn from, the Medicare and Medicaid programs. This situation has changed in recent years.

== National schemes ==
Accreditation schemes recognised as providers of national healthcare accreditation services include:

- Accreditation Association for Ambulatory Health Care (AAAHC) - based in the United States
- American Accreditation Commission International (AACI) - based in the United States
- CHKS Ltd is a specialist provider of healthcare accreditation programmes to UK and international healthcare providers, based in the UK and accredited to ISQua and ISO 17021:2015 standards.
- Lembaga Akreditasi Rumah Sakit (LARS) - based in Indonesia | LARS has been mandated by the Ministry of Health of the Republic of Indonesia as an Independent Institution for Hospital Accreditation
- Lembaga Akreditasi Mutu Fasilitas-Layanan-Kesehatan Indonesia (LAMFI) - based in Indonesia | LAMFI has been mandated by the Ministry of Health of the Republic of Indonesia as an Independent Institution for Community Health Centers (PUSKESMAS), clinics, medical laboratories, and blood transfusion units, and independent medical practices
- The Council for Health Service Accreditation of Southern Africa
- Malaysian Society for Quality in Health ( MSQH) - based in Malaysia
- QHA Trent Accreditation - based in the UK-Europe
- The National Safety and Quality Health Service Standards (NSQHS Standards) developed by the Australian Commission on Safety and Quality in Health Care (ACSQHC)
- Australian Council for Healthcare Standards International (ACHSI) - based in Australia
- Accreditation Canada, formerly known as Canadian Council on Health Services Accreditation, or CCHSA - based in Canada
- Healthcare Facilities Accreditation Program (HFAP) -based in the United States
- The Joint Commission (TJC) - based in the United States
- Community Health Accreditation Program (CHAP) - based in the United States
- Accreditation Commission for Health Care Inc. (ACHC) - based in the United States
- The Compliance Team: "Exemplary Provider Programs" - based in the United States
- Healthcare Quality Association on Accreditation (HQAA) - based in the United States
- DNV - based in Norway and the United States
- Thailand Hospital HA - based in Bangkok, Thailand
- Taiwan Joint Commission on Hospital Accreditation (財團法人醫院評鑑暨醫療品質策進會) - based in Taipei, Taiwan
- La Haute Autorité de Santé, French National Authority for Health, based in Paris, France
- A.N.M.C.S., National Authority of Quality Management in Health, based in Bucharest, Romania
- National Accreditation Board for Hospitals & Healthcare Providers (NABH) based in India
- Center for Improvement in Healthcare Quality (CIHQ) -based in the United States

The different accreditation schemes vary in quality, size, intent and the skill of their marketing. They also vary considerably in terms of the cost incurred by hospitals and healthcare institutions. They have varying degrees of commitment to assessing medical ethical standards and clinical standards.

== International schemes ==
Some accreditation schemes also undertake international healthcare accreditation work outside of their base country. One of the large number of accreditation schemes in the United States, the Joint Commission (TJC) currently being the best known, has created Joint Commission International, or JCI. In recent years, DNV have been challenging TJC in the USA. Accreditation Canada accredited its first organization internationally in 1967 in Bermuda. In 2010, Accreditation Canada International (ACI) was created to provide accreditation to hospitals, clinics, primary care centers and health systems. Acreditas Global (formerly AAAHC International) has been present in Peru since 2012 and Costa Rica.

The former Trent Accreditation Scheme (TAS) from the UK was the first to accredit a hospital in Asia, in Hong Kong in 2000, and QHA Trent Accreditation from the UK have continue to work in the same field. Since TAS started the process, others, such as JCI and ACI, have entered the market.

DNV Healthcare is a Norwegian-US health care accrediting organisation providing a quality management system constructed in accordance with ISO 9001 and approved by the U.S. Centers for Medicare and Medicaid Services (CMS).

ACSA International is a Spanish healthcare accreditation scheme implemented in Spain, Portugal and Brazil. ACSA INternational is Accredited by ISQua (International Socienty for Quality in Healthcare): Standards / Organisation / Surveyor Training Programme. An agreement between this entity and the Brazilian Institute for Excellence in Health (IBES) allows the Andalusian certification model for hospitals and clinical management units to be exported to Brazil.

CHKS Ltd is a specialist international provider of healthcare accreditation programmes based in the UK and accredited to ISQua and ISO 17021:2011 standards www.chks.co.uk

AACI is an international accreditation provider based in Hendersonville, NC, USA and accredited to ISQua, as well as ISO 17021:2015 standards

The OECI is an international organization of cancer centers with an accreditation and designation programme and accredited to ISQua.

The Council for Health Service Accreditation of Southern Africa (COHSASA) is the only internationally accredited quality improvement and accreditation body for healthcare facilities in Africa.

The IASIOS - International Accreditation System in Interventional Oncology Services. It is the world's only Interventional Oncology (IO) accreditation system. Operated by the Interventional Radiology Accreditation Service (IRAS) to establish the highest quality standards in IO. It is supported by 40 interventional radiology societies worldwide. The IASIOS was launched in 2021 and has 14 accredited centres and 42 enrolled and incoming facilities from Europe, Australia, South America, Asia, The Middle East, New Zealand and North America. The Standards of Quality Assurance in Interventional Oncology are essential in achieving the main goal of IASIOS.

== See also ==
- Health insurance
- National Accreditation Board for Hospitals & Healthcare Providers
- List of healthcare accreditation organizations in the United States
- United Kingdom Accreditation Forum
