= Deemed status =

Deemed status is a designation granted by the Centers for Medicare & Medicaid Services (CMS) to a health care provider in the United States that has been accredited by an approved national accreditation organization, allowing the accreditation to substitute for a compliance survey by a state agency.

== Conditions of participation and conditions for coverage ==
For any organization to receive funding from CMS, it must meet either the conditions for coverage (CfCs) or the conditions of participation (CoPs). These are sets of minimal standards which must be met before CMS will issue reimbursement for Medicare and Medicaid services. Areas covered by these standards include the End Stage Renal Disease Program, ambulatory surgical centers, and organ procurement organizations. The standards for nursing homes were distributed as a result of the Nursing Home Reform Act.

Outpatient clinics cannot receive deemed status. A consequence of this is that the CMS payment systems can be more complicated at small clinics than at large hospitals for the same procedures.

Conditions for coverage and conditions of participation apply to the following kinds of organizations:

- Ambulatory surgical centers (ASCs)
- Community mental health centers (CMHCs)
- Comprehensive outpatient rehabilitation facilities (CORFs)
- Critical access hospitals (CAHs)
- End-stage renal disease facilities
- Federally qualified health centers
- Home health agencies
- Hospices
- Hospitals
- Hospital swing beds
- Intermediate care facilities for individuals with intellectual disabilities (ICF/IID)
- Organ procurement organizations (OPOs)
- Portable X-ray suppliers
- Programs for all-inclusive care for the elderly organizations (PACE)
- Clinics, rehabilitation agencies, and public health agencies as providers of outpatient physical therapy and speech-language pathology services
- Psychiatric hospitals
- Religious nonmedical health care institutions
- Rural health clinics
- Long-term care facilities
- Transplant centers

== Accreditation and deeming ==
Two kinds of organizations can review a health care provider for compliance with the conditions of participation or conditions for coverage: a state-level agency acting on behalf of CMS, or a national accreditation organization such as the Joint Commission.

When an organization is reviewed, the survey checks quality assurance rather than continuous quality improvement. The process checks for minimal expectations, not whether the facility is improving.

== History ==
In 1994, about 5,000 hospitals were eligible to receive CMS funding as a result of being reviewed by the Joint Commission.

The Medicare Improvements for Patients and Providers Act of 2008 removed the deemed status of the Joint Commission and directed it to reapply to CMS to seek continued authority to review hospitals for conditions for coverage and conditions of participation.
