= List of healthcare accreditation organizations in the United States =

The following organizations survey and accredit hospitals and healthcare organizations in the US.

== Medicare and Medicaid deeming ==
A number have deeming power for Medicare and Medicaid.

- American Association for Accreditation of Ambulatory Surgery Facilities (AAAASF)
- Accreditation Association for Ambulatory Health Care (AAAHC)
- Accreditation Commission for Health Care (ACHC)
- American Board for Certification in Orthotics, Prosthetics & Pedorthics (ABC)
- Board of Certification/Accreditation, International (BOC)
- Center for Improvement in Healthcare Quality (CIHQ)
- Commission on Accreditation of Rehabilitation Facilities (CARF)
- Community Health Accreditation Program(CHAP)
- DNV GL Healthcare
- Foundation for the Accreditation of Cellular Therapy (FACT)
- Global Healthcare Accreditation (GHA)
- Healthcare Facilities Accreditation Program (HFAP)
- Healthcare Quality Association on Accreditation (HQAA)
- Institute for Medical Quality (IMQ)
- Joint Commission (TJC)
- National Committee for Quality Assurance (NCQA)
- National Dialysis Accreditation Commission (NDAC)
- The Compliance Team, "Exemplary Provider Programs"
- The Intersocietal Accreditation Commission(IAC)
- Utilization Review Accreditation Commission (URAC)

== Education accreditation ==
=== Birth Centers ===
- The Commission for the Accreditation of Birth Centers

=== Emergency Medicine ===
- National Registry of Emergency Medical Technicians (NREMT)

=== Medicine ===
- Accreditation Council for Continuing Medical Education
- Federation of State Medical Boards
- National Board of Medical Examiners

=== Nursing ===
- National Council of State Boards of Nursing

College of Nursing accreditation

- American Association of Colleges of Nursing
- Commission on Collegiate Nursing Education
- National League for Nursing

Advanced practice nursing college accreditation

- American College of Nurse-Midwives
- Council of Accreditation of Nurse Anesthesia Educational Programs

=== Respiratory care ===
College of respiratory care accreditation

- Committee on Accreditation for Respiratory Care

Non-governmental credentialing bodies

- National Board for Respiratory Care

=== Surgery ===
- Association of Surgical Technologists
- Surgical Review Corporation

=== Therapeutics ===
- American Occupational Therapy Association (AOTA)
- American Physical Therapy Association (APTA)
- National Board of Certified Occupational Therapy (NBCOT)
