= Community Health Accreditation Program =

The Community Health Accreditation Partner (CHAP) is a national, independent, U.S. not-for-profit accrediting body for community-based health care organizations. CHAP is the oldest national, community-based accrediting body with more than 9,000 agencies currently accredited nationwide.

== History ==
In 1965, CHAP was the first to recognize the need and value for accreditation in community-based care. The organization was created as a joint venture between the American Public Health Association and the National League for Nursing (NLN). CHAP became a separately incorporated, non-profit subsidiary of the NLN in 1988, under the CHAP name.

In 1992, CHAP was granted deeming authority for home care by the Centers for Medicare and Medicaid Services. In 1999 it received deeming authority for hospices. CHAP has the regulatory authority to survey agencies providing home health, hospice, and home medical equipment services, to determine if they meet the Medicare Conditions of Participation and CMS Quality Standards.

Through "deeming authority" granted by the Centers for Medicare and Medicaid Services (CMS), in 1992, CHAP has the regulatory authority to survey agencies providing home health, hospice, and home medical equipment services to determine if they meet the Medicare Conditions of Participation and CMS Quality Standards.

For context about CHAP's role, one could turn to how its accreditation function is considered quasi-voluntary. Here, although the accreditation appears to be voluntary, there is often a linked governmental regulation that encourages organizations and their programs to comply in the process. This is part of the move towards promoting common standards among health departments both on the state and national levels. Today, the CHAP accreditation is recognized as the standard when determining the level of excellence in home care. Meeting CHAP's requirements is the same as satisfying the CMS standards.

== See also ==
- Community Health
- Community health centers in the United States
- Hospital Accreditation
- Hospice Accreditation
- International healthcare accreditation
- List of Healthcare Accreditation Organizations in the USA
