= Harvey Picker =

Harvey Picker (December 8, 1915 – March 22, 2008) was an American businessman, educator, inventor, and philanthropist. He was the founder, along with his wife, Jean, of the Boston-based Picker Institute, whose goal was to promote patient-centered healthcare. In 2000, they founded the Picker Institute Europe.

His wife, Mrs. Jean Sovatkin Picker (Smith College, 1942), who died in 1990, served as a U.S. delegate to the United Nations and was a journalist for Life Magazine.

They "funded the development of survey methods widely used in America and Europe to gauge patient satisfaction."

== Picker X-Ray company ==
Picker's father, James, founded Picker X-ray, which was acquired by General Electric Co. Ltd. of England in 1981. It produced air-dropped X-ray labs for the Army in World War II and the Korean War. The younger Harvey led the company into such pioneering fields as cobalt treatment for cancer and ultrasound and nuclear imaging diagnostics; he remained with the company from 1946 to 1968. At age 50, Picker sold the family business.

== Academia ==
After earning his doctorate, Picker worked briefly in the diplomatic service. He taught political science at Colgate University. Between 1972 and 1983 he served as dean of Columbia University's School of International and Public Affairs.

== Picker Institute (Boston-based) ==
Dr. and Mrs. Picker believed that the American health care system was technologically and scientifically outstanding but overall was not sensitive to patients' concerns and their comfort. Thus, in 1986, they founded the Picker Institute—a not-for-profit organization dedicated to developing a patient-centered approach to healthcare—and in 2000 founded the Picker Institute Europe.

The Boston-based Picker Institute ceased operations in January 2013.

== Picker Institute Europe ==
The England-based institute founded by the Pickers is named Picker Institute Europe; they've been critical of the Friends and Family Test. As did the Boston-based institute, the focus is on patient care.

== Personal ==
Picker's New York Times obituary said that he is survived by two daughters and three grandchildren. He graduated from Colgate University (BA), Harvard Business School (MBA), and Columbia University (PhD).
