= Clinical audit =

Medical care quality improvement process

Clinical audit is a process that has been defined as a quality improvement process that seeks to improve patient care and outcomes through systematic review of care against explicit criteria and the implementation of change

The key component of clinical audit is that performance is reviewed (or audited), to ensure that what should be being done is being done, and if not, it provides a framework to enable improvements to be made. It had been formally incorporated in the healthcare systems of a number of countries, for instance in 1993 into the United Kingdom's National Health Service (NHS), and within the NHS there is a clinical audit guidance group in the Clinical audit comes under the clinical governance umbrella and forms part of the system for improving the standard of clinical practice.

== History ==
The first recorded medical audit was done by Sinan Ibnu Thabit, Chief Physician of Baghdad dan Abu Batiha al-Muhtasib (market inspector) at the request of Abbasid Caliph Al-Muqtadir after medical malpractice resulted in death of a patient. Following the investigation, the first medical licensing examination has been introduced, and only physicians who pass the exam can practice medicine. According to Ibnu Al-Ukhuwwa in his book, Ma'alim al-Qurba: fi Ahkam al-Hisba, "If the patient is cured, the physician is paid. If the patient dies, his parents go to the chief doctor, they present the prescriptions written by the physician. If the chief doctor judges that the physician has performed his job perfectly without negligence, he tells the parents that death was natural; if he judges otherwise, he tells them: take the blood money of your relative from the physician; he killed him by his bad performance and negligence. In this honourable way they were sure that medicine is practiced by experienced, well-trained persons."

One of first clinical audits was undertaken by Florence Nightingale during the Crimean War of 1853–55. On arrival at the medical barracks hospital in Scutari in 1854, Nightingale was appalled by the unsanitary conditions and high mortality rates among injured or ill soldiers. She and her team of 38 nurses applied strict sanitary routines and standards of hygiene to the hospital and equipment; in addition, Nightingale had a talent for mathematics and statistics, and she and her staff kept meticulous records of the mortality rates among the hospital patients. Following these changes the mortality rates fell from 40% to 2%, and the results were instrumental in overcoming the resistance of the British doctors and officers to Nightingale's procedures. Her methodical approach, as well as the emphasis on uniformity and comparability of the results of health care, is recognised as one of the earliest programs of outcomes management.

Another notable figure who advocated clinical audit was Ernest Codman (1869–1940). Codman became known as the first true medical auditor following his work in 1912 on monitoring surgical outcomes. Codman's "end result idea" was to follow every patient's case history after surgery to identify errors made by individual surgeons on specific patients. Although his work is often neglected in the history of health care assessment, Codman's work anticipated contemporary approaches to quality monitoring and assurance, establishing accountability, and allocating and managing resources efficiently.

Whilst Codman's 'clinical' approach is in contrast with Nightingale's more 'epidemiological' audits, these two methods serve to highlight the different methodologies that can be used in the process of improvement to patient outcome.

== Integration into contemporary healthcare ==
Despite the successes of Nightingale in the Crimea and Codman in Massachusetts, clinical audit was slow to catch on. This situation was to remain for the next 130 or so years, with only a minority of healthcare staff embracing the process as a means of evaluating the quality of care delivered to patients.

As concepts of clinical audit have developed, so too have the definitions which sought to encapsulate and explain the idea. These changes generally reflect the movement away from the medico-centric views of the mid-Twentieth Century to the more multidisciplinary approach used in modern healthcare. It also reflects the change in focus from a professionally centred view of health provision to the view of the patient-centred approach. These changes can be seen from comparison of the following definitions.

- Standards-based audit – A cycle which involves defining standards, collecting data to measure current practice against those standards, and implementing any changes deemed necessary.
- Adverse occurrence screening and critical incident monitoring – This is often used to peer review cases which have caused concern or from which there was an unexpected outcome. The multidisciplinary team discusses individual anonymous cases to reflect upon the way the team functioned and to learn for the future. In the primary care setting, this is described as a 'significant event audit'.
- Surgical audit – Data collection of all surgical cases, followed by ongoing review and assessment of performance and outcomes. Related to peer review, but is distinguished by aiming for inclusion of all cases carried out, rather than sampling alone.
- Peer review – An assessment of the quality of care provided by a clinical team with a view to improving clinical care. Individual cases are discussed by peers to determine, with the benefit of hindsight, whether the best care was given. This is similar to the method described above, but might include 'interesting' or 'unusual' cases rather than problematic ones. Unfortunately, recommendations made from these reviews are often not pursued as there is no systematic method to follow.
- Patient surveys and focus groups – These are methods used to obtain users' views about the quality of care they have received.

== Clinical audits in the NHS ==
In 1989, the white paper, Working for patients, saw the first move in the UK to standardise clinical audit as part of professional healthcare. The paper defined medical audit (as it was called then) as

"the systematic critical analysis of the quality of medical care including the procedures used for diagnosis and treatment, the use of resources and the resulting outcome and quality of life for the patient."

Medical audit later evolved into clinical audit and a revised definition was announced by the NHS Executive:

"Clinical audit is the systematic analysis of the quality of healthcare, including the procedures used for diagnosis, treatment and care, the use of resources and the resulting outcome and quality of life for the patient."

The National Institute for Health and Clinical Excellence (NICE) published the paper Principles for Best Practice in Clinical Audit, which defines clinical audit as

"a quality improvement process that seeks to improve patient care and outcomes through systematic review of care against explicit criteria and the implementation of change. Aspects of the structure, processes, and outcomes of care are selected and systematically evaluated against explicit criteria. Where indicated, changes are implemented at an individual, team, or service level and further monitoring is used to confirm improvement in healthcare delivery."

Clinical audit was incorporated within Clinical Governance in the 1997 White Paper, "The New NHS : Modern, Dependable", which brought together disparate service improvement processes and formally established them into a coherent Clinical Governance framework.

== Clinical audit process ==
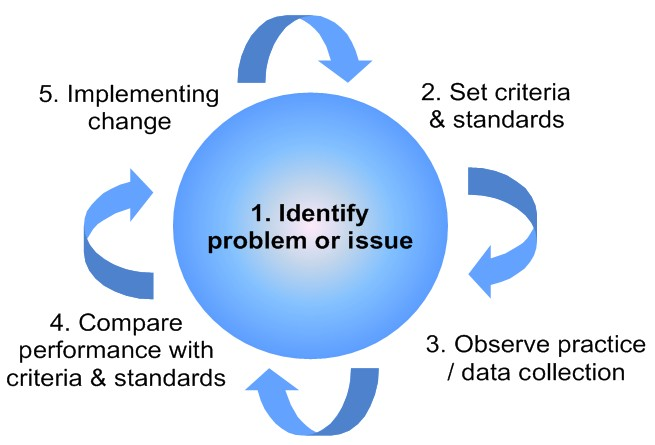
The clinical audit process seeks to identify areas for service improvement, develop & carry out action plans to rectify or improve service provision and then to re-audit to ensure that these changes have an effect.

Clinical audit can be described as a cycle or a spiral, see figure. Within the cycle there are stages that follow the systematic process of: establishing best practice; measuring against criteria; taking action to improve care; and monitoring to sustain improvement. As the process continues, each cycle aspires to a higher level of quality.

These processes are related to change management methodology and use the techniques of PDSA cycles, LEAN, Six Sigma, root cause analysis and process mapping.

Stage 1: Identify the problem or issue

This stage involves the selection of a topic or issue to be audited, and is likely to involve measuring adherence to healthcare processes that have been shown to produce best outcomes for patients. Selection of an audit topic is influenced by factors including:

- where national standards and guidelines exist; where there is conclusive evidence about effective clinical practice (i.e. evidence-based medicine).
- areas where problems have been encountered in practice.
- what patients and public have recommended that be looked at.
- where there is a clear potential for improving service delivery.
- areas of high volume, high risk or high cost, in which improvements can be made.

Additionally, audit topics may be recommended by national bodies, such as NICE or the Healthcare Commission, in which NHS trusts may agree to participate. The Trent Accreditation Scheme recommends a culture of audit to participating hospitals inside and outside of the UK, and can provide advice on audit topics.

Stage 2: Define criteria and standards

Decisions regarding the overall purpose of the audit, either as what should happen as a result of the audit, or what question you want the audit to answer, should be written as a series of statements or tasks that the audit will focus on. Collectively, these form the audit criteria. These criteria are explicit statements that define what is being measured and represent elements of care that can be measured objectively. The standards define the aspect of care to be measured, and should always be based on the best available evidence.

- A criterion is a measurable outcome of care, aspect of practice or capacity. For example, 'parents / carers are involved in negotiating or planning their child's care'.
- A standard is the threshold of the expected compliance for each criterion (these are usually expressed as a percentage). For the above example an appropriate standard would be: 'There is evidence of parent / carer in care planning in 90% of cases'.

Stage 3: Data collection

To ensure that the data collected are precise, and that only essential information is collected, certain details of what is to be audited must be established from the outset. These include:

- The user group to be included, with any exceptions noted.
- The healthcare professionals involved in the users' care.
- The period over which the criteria apply.

Sample sizes for data collection are often a compromise between the statistical validity of the results and pragmatical issues around data collection. Data to be collected may be available in a computerised information system, or in other cases it may be appropriate to collect data manually or electronically using data capture solutions such as Formic, depending on the outcome being measured. In either case, considerations need to be given to what data will be collected, where the data will be found, and who will do the data collection.

Ethical issues must also be considered; the data collected must relate only to the objectives of the audit, and staff and patient confidentiality must be respected – identifiable information must not be used. Any potentially sensitive topics should be discussed with the local medical ethics committee.

Stage 4: Compare performance with criteria and standards

This is the analysis stage, whereby the results of the data collection are compared with criteria and standards. The end stage of analysis is concluding how well the standards were met and, if applicable, identifying reasons why the standards weren't met in all cases. These reasons might be agreed to be acceptable, i.e. could be added to the exception criteria for the standard in future, or will suggest a focus for improvement measures.

In theory, any case where the standard (criteria or exceptions) was not met in 100% of cases suggests a potential for improvement in care. In practice, where standard results were close to 100%, it might be agreed that any further improvement will be difficult to obtain and that other standards, with results further away from 100%, are the priority targets for action. This decision will depend on the topic area – in some 'life or death' type cases, it will be important to achieve 100%, in other areas a much lower result might still be considered acceptable.

Stage 5: Implementing change

Once the results of the audit have been published and discussed, an agreement must be reached about the recommendations for change. Using an action plan to record these recommendations is good practice; this should include who has agreed to do what and by when. Each point needs to be well defined, with an individual named as responsible for it, and an agreed timescale for its completion.

Action plan development may involve refinement of the audit tool particularly if measures used are found to be inappropriate or incorrectly assessed. In other instances new process or outcome measures may be needed or involve linkages to other departments or individuals. Too often audit results in criticism of other organisations, departments or individuals without their knowledge or involvement. Joint audit is far more profitable in this situation and should be encouraged by the Clinical Audit lead and manager.

Re-audit: Sustaining Improvements

After an agreed period, the audit should be repeated. The same strategies for identifying the sample, methods and data analysis should be used to ensure comparability with the original audit. The re-audit should demonstrate that the changes have been implemented and that improvements have been made. Further changes may then be required, leading to additional re-audits.

This stage is critical to the successful outcome of an audit process – as it verifies whether the changes implemented have had an effect and to see if further improvements are required to achieve the standards of healthcare delivery identified in stage 2.

Results of good audit should be disseminated both locally via the strategic health authorities and nationally where possible. Professional journals, such as the BMJ and the Nursing Standard publish the findings of good quality audits, especially if the work or the methodology is generalisable.

== Clinical audit promotion ==
While clinical audit makes great sense, there can be problems in persuading hospitals and clinicians to undertake and apply clinical audit in their work. Nonetheless, in the UK clinical audit is one of the corpus of clinical governance measures that are required to be enacted throughout the NHS.

Outside the UK, hospital accreditation schemes, such as the Trent Accreditation Scheme, have promoted the development and execution of clinical audit as a part of clinical governance in places such as Hong Kong and Malta.

== See also ==
- Healthcare Quality Improvement Partnership
- Clinical Governance
- Trent Accreditation Scheme
- SNOMED CT
