= Healthcare Quality Association on Accreditation =

US not-for-profit health care accrediting body

The Healthcare Quality Association on Accreditation (HQAA) is a US not-for-profit health care accrediting body and is an alternative to the Community Health Accreditation Partner (CHAP), Accreditation Commission for Health Care and Joint Commission. The organization provides an accreditation option specifically designed with the durable medical equipment (DME).

Headquartered in Waterloo, Iowa, HQAA was developed following passage of the Medicare Modernization Act of 2003. It has been awarded Medicare deeming status for DME accreditation.

== See also ==
- Hospital accreditation
- International healthcare accreditation
- List of healthcare accreditation organisations in the USA
- Patient safety
- Patient safety organization
