= Stephen Bolsin =

British anaesthetist (born 1952)

Stephen Bolsin

Stephen Nicholas Cluley Bolsin (born 1952) is a British anaesthetist whose actions as a whistleblower exposed incompetent paediatric cardiac surgery at the Bristol Royal Infirmary leading to the implementation of clinical governance reforms in the United Kingdom.

== Career background ==
Stephen Bolsin graduated with BSc Hons (Anatomy) London in 1974 and MB, BS London in 1977. He became a fellow of the Royal College of Anaesthetists London in 1982. Bolsin became a consultant anaesthetist at the Bristol Royal Infirmary, The Bristol Eye Hospital England in 1989. He was the first national audit co-ordinator of the Association of Cardiothoracic Anaesthetists of Great Britain & Ireland London England 1991–1996.

== The Bristol paediatric cardiac surgery scandal ==
In 1989, as a new consultant anaesthetist at the Bristol Royal Infirmary, Bolsin identified that too many babies were dying during heart surgery. He spent the next six years confirming the high mortality rates and attempting to improve the service. This led to a fall in mortality rates for children's heart surgery in Bristol from 30% to less than 5%; it also, however, led to direct confrontation with paediatric cardiac surgeons whom the hospital refused to investigate. Bolsin eventually took his concerns to the media and became a whistleblower. Bolsin's actions led directly to a major government inquiry, the Kennedy Report which made wide-ranging recommendations about reform of clinical governance in UK hospitals.

From 1989 to 1995, Bolsin published numerous articles and chapters in textbooks relating to the provision of high quality cardiac services while he was a consultant anaesthetist at the Bristol Royal Infirmary. He also acted as a Department of Health Committee member advising on the assessment of quality and performance in cardiac surgery in the UK from 1992 to 1995. Over the same period, Bolsin was a Department of Health Advisor on performance measurement and risk adjustment in cardiac surgery. The Department of Health Committee, supported by the then chief medical officer, Sir Kenneth Calman, was provided with £3 million to introduce audit of cardiac surgical activity in the NHS and was chaired by Professor Taylor.

== Significance of Bolsin's whistleblowing ==
Bolsin's actions significantly reduced high death rates for children's heart surgery in The Bristol Royal Infirmary. This was the first time that such a serious problem had been identified and then rectified in the NHS. It remains to this day the most important single-handed clinical outcomes improvement brought about in the NHS. Particularly as a result of widespread adoption of recommendations from the Kennedy Report, Bolsin's actions have affected clinical governance in each specialty in every hospital in the NHS. The concept of ‘Clinical Governance’ that has emerged and taken root in the UK NHS, Australia, New Zealand and globally, arose directly out of Bolsin's actions in Bristol. The GMC have confirmed that Bolsin was the only doctor in the UK prepared to write to them about the events in the children's cardiac surgery service at the Bristol Royal Infirmary. Over the years that this case was discussed in the House of Commons, Members of Parliament confirmed that Bolsin knowingly sacrificed his job, professional popularity and ultimately his young family's life in Britain in defence of his conscience, what he knew was morally right. Bolsin's achievements in establishing Clinical Governance across the UK and globally have never been formally acknowledged in the UK.

In 2013 Bolsin contributed his case to the Whistleblower Interview Project.

== Patient safety work in Australia ==
Being unable to obtain work in the UK after the scandal, Bolsin took up a senior appointment at the Geelong Hospital in Australia. In 1996, he became director of the Department of Perioperative Medicine, Anaesthesia & Pain Management The Geelong Hospital, Ryrie Street, Geelong, Victoria. In 1997, he became an honorary associate professor in the Department of Pharmacology Faculty of Medicine, University of Melbourne, Victoria 1997. In 2003 he became honorary adjunct professor, Department of Epidemiology & Preventive Medicine Monash University, Victoria. In 2005 he was appointed senior principal research fellow and honorary associate professor in the Department of Clinical & Biomedical Sciences Faculty of Medicine, University of Melbourne Victoria.

In Australia, he has collaborated with other academics in assisting other healthcare whistleblowers. He has also promoted the idea of personalised digital recording of adverse incidents (including near-misses) as a means of improving healthcare quality by medical professionals, particularly those involved in anaesthesia and surgery. Bolsin has contributed to medical and ethical standards in the UK, Australia, New Zealand, Ireland, US and China by lecturing, publishing in the medical press, teaching medical students and developing innovative technology.

More recently Bolsin has agreed that the failure of Clinical Governance to reduce adverse events in complex healthcare should lead to the adoption of Clinician Engagement. His group proposed that clinician engagement in an organisation can be quantified as the percentage of patients treated whose care complied with approved specialist society guidelines. Bolsin has also documented the use of 'Nudge Theory' in hospital to improve the quality of pain relief delivered to patients after Caesarean section delivery.

== Awards and recognition ==
- Civil Justice Award, Australian Plaintiff Lawyers Association 1998
- Lambie-Dew Medal and Oration, The University of Sydney 1999
- Honorary Doctorate of Letters, The University of Buckingham 2004
- Victorian Public Healthcare Awards Commendation 2005
- R. C. Godfrey Oration, Princess Margaret Hospital 2007
- Frederic Hewitt Medal, Royal College of Anaesthetists 2013
- Ferguson-Glass Oration, Royal Australasian College of Physicians 2015
- Jackson-Rees Medal and Lecture, Association of Paediatric Anaesthetists of Great Britain and Ireland 2017
- Honorary Fellowship of the College of Anaesthetists of Ireland 2020
- Medal of the Order of Australia 2025
