= Colin Bradley (footballer) =

Australian rules footballer (1921–2013)

Personal information
- Full name: Colin Bradley
- Born: 2 March 1921
- Died: 6 September 2013 (aged 92)
- Original team: Preston

Playing career^{1}
Years	Club	Games (Goals)
1942–44	Melbourne	16 (0)
- ^{1} Playing statistics correct to the end of 1944.

Colin Bradley (2 March 1921 – 6 September 2013) was an Australian rules footballer who played with Melbourne in the Victorian Football League (VFL).
