= Denis Pereira Gray =

British general practitioner

Sir Denis John Pereira Gray OBE FRCP FRCGP FMedSci (born 2 October 1935) is a retired British general practitioner. He worked for 38 years in the St Leonard's Medical Practice, Exeter, and continued as a research consultant until 2018, following his father and grandfather.

== Early life ==
Pereira Gray was born in Exeter. He was educated at Exeter School and then at St John's College, Cambridge and Bart's Medical School, graduating with a medical degree.

== Career ==
He was chairman of the Council and later president of the Royal College of General Practitioners and chairman of the Trustees of the Nuffield Trust. He was the first general practitioner to be elected chairman of the Academy of Medical Royal Colleges.

In 2022, he was still contributing to The Lancet - defending the importance of empathy.

== Awards and honours ==
He was knighted in the 1999 New Year Honours for services to Quality and Standards in General Practice. He was awarded a Doctor of Science degree by the University of Exeter in 2009. In 2013, he was made an honorary Fellow of the Academy of Medical Educators.

He was listed by Pulse in 2010 among the 50 most influential GPs in the previous 50 years.

== Selected publications ==
=== Books ===
- Running a Practice (jtly with Jones RVH, Bolden KJ and Hall MS, 1978)
- Training for General Practice, Mcdonald and Evans, Plymouth 1982
- Forty Years On: The Story of the First 40 Years of the Royal College of General Practitioners (ed, 1992)
- Psychiatry and General Practice Today with Ian M. Pullen, and Greg Wilkinson and Alastair Wright, London RCPsych 1994
- Developing Primary Care: The Academic Contribution 1996

=== Articles ===
Pereira Gray has had over 200 articles published in scientific medical journals.

- Pereira Gray D, Sidaway-Lee K, White E, Thorne A, Evans PH. Continuity of care with doctors—a matter of life and death? A systematic review of continuity of care and mortality. BMJ Open 2018; 8:e021161 Available on the BMJ Open site
- Pereira Gray D, Henley W, Chenore T, Sidaway-Lee K, Evans PH. What is the relationship between age and deprivation in influencing emergency hospital admissions? A model using data from a defined, comprehensive, all-age cohort in East Devon, UK. BMJ Open 2017; 7:e014045
- Chenore T, Pereira Gray DJ, Forrer J, Wright C, Evans PH. "Emergency hospital admissions for the elderly: insights from the Devon Predictive Model". Journal of Public Health, 2013; 35(4):616-23 doi: 10.1093/pubmed/fdt009.
- Pereira Gray DJ, Evans PH, Wright C, Langley P. "The cost of diagnosing type 2 diabetes mellitus by clinical opportunistic screening in general practice". Diabetic Medicine, 2012; 29: 863-868).
- Pereira Gray D. "Biographies in theory and in practice" (Editorial). Journal of Medical Biography, 2010; 18: 63.
