= United Kingdom Accreditation Forum =

British network of healthcare accreditation organisations

The United Kingdom Accreditering Forum (UKAF), founded in June 1998 by a group of leading healthcare accreditation organisations, is a London-based network of healthcare accreditation organisations formed with the intention of sharing experience regarding good practice in accreditation, as well as sharing new ideas around improving the methodology for such programmes. It has an additional role in working to ensure that the general public develop a clearer idea about accreditation, its function, its implications and its execution.

The aim of UKAF is to provide an effective network of organisations which operate or have a practical interest in developing standards-based assessment and accreditation programmes in healthcare.

The group meets quarterly, and is self-funding through annual organisational membership subscriptions.

== Remit ==
- cataloguing programmes and defining their products, both to users and to the general public
- encouraging the sharing of core developments between programmes
- mutual peer review of accreditation programmes
- exploration of the peer review techniques
- the recruitment, training, monitoring and evaluation of surveyors
- the mechanisms for awards of accredited status to organizations
- developing healthcare quality standards
- the implementation of standards within healthcare organizations
- self-regulation: to seek voluntary convergence of standards and of the operation of the assessment process
- to provide a mechanism for accreditation bodies to communicate with each other and, collectively, with others such as government departments, professional colleges and national associations, and commissioning, funding and insurance agencies

== Member accreditation schemes ==
Members of UKAF include:

- Accreditation for Acute Inpatient Mental Health Services (AIMS)
- Accreditation of Library and Information Services in the Health Sector
- Autism Accreditation
- Better Services for People who Self-harm
- Child Health Informatics Centre (CHIC)
- CHKS Healthcare Accreditation and Quality Unit
- Clinical Pathology Accreditation (UK) Ltd. (CPA)
- Community of Communities
- Electroconvulsive Therapy Accreditation Service (ECTAS)
- Health Promoting Hospitals and Trusts
- The Prescribing Observatory for Mental Health–UK (POMH-UK)
- QHA Trent Accreditation
- Quality Network for Forensic Mental Health Services
- Quality Improvement Network for Multi-agency Child and Adolescent Mental Health Services
- Quality Network for In-Patient Child and Adolescent Mental Health Services (QNIC)
- RDB Star Rating Ltd (Residential and Domiciliary Care Benchmarking)

== See also ==
- International healthcare accreditation
- List of international healthcare accreditation organizations
- Hospital accreditation
- Accreditation
- Medical ethics
- Clinical governance
