= Critical appraisal =

Critical appraisal (or quality assessment) in evidence based medicine, is the use of explicit, transparent methods to assess the data in published research, applying the rules of evidence to factors such as internal validity, adherence to reporting standards, conclusions, generalizability and risk-of-bias. Critical appraisal methods form a central part of the systematic review process. They are used in evidence synthesis to assist clinical decision-making, and are increasingly used in evidence-based social care and education provision.

Critical appraisal checklists help to appraise the quality of the study design and (for quantitative studies) the risk of bias. Critical appraisal tools for cross-sectional studies are the AXIS, JBI, Nested Knowledge tools; for randomised controlled trials are Nested Knowledge, Cochrane Risk of Bias Tool, JBI tool and CASP tools. Additionally, supplementary critical appraisal tools such as Naicker's Critically Appraising for Antiracism Tool and the Aboriginal and Torres Strait Islander Quality Appraisal Tool may be used in conjunction with tools for specific study designs to assess additional biases or ethics practices. Critical appraisal may also be an integral part of formalized approaches to turn evidence into recommendations for practice such as GRADE.

== See also ==
- Evidence-based medicine
- Systematic review
- Meta-analysis
