= End Stage Renal Disease Program =

1972 US Congressional Medicare legislation

In 1972 the United States Congress passed legislation authorizing the End Stage Renal Disease Program (ESRD) under Medicare. Section 299I of Public Law 92-603, passed on October 30, 1972, extended Medicare coverage to Americans if they had stage five chronic kidney disease (CKD) and were otherwise qualified under Medicare's work history requirements. The program's launch was July 1, 1973. Previously only those over 65 could qualify for Medicare benefits. This entitlement is nearly universal, covering over 90% of all U.S. citizens with severe CKD.

== Dialysis reimbursement ==
Medicare's unit of payment is one composite rate per dialysis treatment. The ESRD composite rate payment system differs from most other prospective payment systems because there is a single product category to define the service Medicare is buying. Although different equipment, supplies, and labor are needed for hemodialysis and peritoneal dialysis, the current system does not differentiate payment based on dialysis method, location (home or incenter) or equipment used.

The composite rate is intended to cover all operating and capital costs that efficient providers would incur in furnishing dialysis in outpatient facilities or in beneficiaries' homes. The base composite rate as of 2006 is $130 for freestanding dialysis facilities. Medicare caps its payments to facilities at an amount equal to three dialysis sessions per week. Although home dialysis may be given more frequently it is not fully reimbursed by Medicare.

An add-on payment supplements the composite rate. It represents some of the profits previously associated with payments for separately billable drugs. The Social Security Act (Section 1881(b)), as amended by Section 623 of the Medicare Prescription Drug, Improvement, and Modernization Act of 2003, directed revisions to the composite rate payment system as well as payment for separately billable drugs furnished by dialysis facilities. There is an annual update to the add-on payment which is determined administratively by CMS. Congressional Record 5827 updates the drug add-on payment. For 2008 the drug add-on payment to the composite payment rate increased from 14.9 percent to 15.5 percent.

In addition to the add-on payment adjustment, which applies nationally, the composite rate is adjusted up or down by a geographic wage adjustment. (All beneficiaries at a given unit would have the same geographic wage adjustment.) The final adjustment is for case mix; certain beneficiary characteristics trigger composite rate adjustments. These are based on age (<18, 18–44, 45–59, 60–69, 70–79, ≥80 years), body surface area and body mass index.

== Medicare secondary payer provision ==
The Medicare Secondary Payer provision of the ESRD program (also known as the ESRD Coordination Period) was enacted as part of the Omnibus Budget Reconciliation Act of 1981. MSP provides for a coordination of benefits period between Medicare and private health insurance plans for individuals entitled to Medicare solely on the basis of ESRD. If an individual is entitled to Medicare because of ESRD and is covered by an Employer Group Health Plan (EGHP), the EGHP is the first payer (primary) for the first thirty months. The 1981 legislation created an eighteen-month MSP period; the Balanced Budget Act of 1997 extended the eighteen-month period to thirty months. The EGHP is primary regardless of the number of employees and/or the Medicare beneficiary's employment status.
