= Colin Bradley (physician) =

Irish physician and professor

Colin Bradley is a professor of general practice at University College Cork, best known for his 1995 paper on significant event audit, co-authored with Mike Pringle.

== Selected publications ==
- “Significant Event Auditing”, co-authored with Bradley C, Carmichael C, Wallis H, Moore A., Occasional Paper 70. London: Royal College of General Practitioners, 1995
