= The Compliance Team =

- Industry: Healthcare
- Founded: 1994
- Founder: Sandra Canally
- Website: thecomplianceteam.org

The Compliance Team (TCT) Inc., is a US for-profit organization that provides Exemplary Provider accreditation and certification services to healthcare providers across the United States. It was set up in 1994 and is based in Philadelphia, Pennsylvania.

The company is a recognized Center for Medicare and Medicaid Services.

As of 2024, TCT has accredited more than 1,000 providers across all 50 states, Puerto Rico, and the U.S. Virgin Islands.

== History ==
The company was founded by Sandra Canally, a former nurse oncologist, in 1994.

In 2006, The Compliance Team was formally granted national deeming authority by the Centers for Medicare and Medicaid Services as an accrediting body for all type of durable medical equipment (DME) including respiratory, mobility, woundcare, orthopedic, prosthetics, orthotics, diabetic, ostomy, and incontinence supplies. DME point of service providers include pharmacy, home care, podiatrists and orthopedic surgeons.

The company released a pharmacy-based program for Clinical Disease Management (CDM) in May 2022.

In April 2023, TCT launched a national healthcare accreditation program for Local Health Departments (LHDs). The new program was approved by the Centers for Medicare & Medicaid Services (CMS).

== See also ==
- Hospital accreditation
- International healthcare accreditation
- List of healthcare accreditation organisations in the USA
- Patient safety
- Patient safety organization
