= Revalidation =

Periodical reassessment of competence of health practitioners in UK

In the United Kingdom and Australia, revalidation refers to a mechanism used to "affirm or establish the continuing competence" of health practitioners, whilst strengthening and facilitating ethical and professional "commitment to reducing errors, adhering to best practice and improving quality of care". Medical practitioners, nurses and midwives practicing in the UK are subject to revalidation to prove their skills are up-to-date and they remain fit to practise medicine. It is intended to reassure patients, employers and other professionals, and to contribute to improving patient care and safety. The Medical Board of Australia is currently engaged in a review and trial of revalidation of medical registration in Australia.

== Revalidation in the United Kingdom ==
In the UK, nurses and midwives will need to revalidate every three years. A doctor will undergo revalidation every five years. A recommendation to revalidate a doctor will go to the UK medical regulator, the General Medical Council (GMC), from a local 'Responsible Officer'. The Responsible Officer will usually be a senior doctor in the healthcare organisation which employs the doctor, such as the medical director. The Responsible Officer's recommendation will usually be based on the doctor's history of annual appraisals. Doctors and nurses will need to keep a portfolio of evidence showing how they are meeting relevant standards, which will form the basis for discussion at their annual appraisals. It is not an examination process.

In the UK, Revalidation for Doctors started on 3 December 2012. Revalidation for nurses was approved and finalised on 8 October 2015, the first nurses and midwives to revalidate began to do so in April 2016.

=== Process of revalidation ===
The process of revalidation will be planned by the UK Revalidation Programme Board.

=== Appraisal Portfolio ===
The portfolio for the appraisal should include the following six types of supporting information that a doctor is expected to discuss with their appraiser at least once within the five year cycle:

1. Continuing Professional Development
2. Quality Improvement Activity
3. Significant events
4. Feedback from Colleagues
5. Feedback From Patients
6. Review of Complaints and Compliments

More information regarding these may be found from the GMC's publication "Ready for Revalidation" (March 2012).

=== Responsible Officers ===
Section 119 of the Health and Social Care Act 2008 created the role of the Responsible Officer. The role is exercised by a designated individual, most likely the medical director of an individual's organisation, who is tasked with making recommendations to the GMC with regards to the revalidation of their staff.

== Proposed Revalidation in Australia ==
A range of potential revalidation models has been considered, with the Medical Board of Australia recently proposing its preferred approach for further consultation and trial. Most notably, the Medical Board of Australia proposes that revalidation integrate a formal method for proactive identification of potential practitioner competency risk.

The Medical Board of Australia proposes to achieve this by bifurcating revalidation into two separate, but related, stages:

1. The first stage will consist of universally compulsory continuing professional development activities;
2. These would be 'nested' within a second stage, that consists of more vigorous activities that would only apply to select medical practitioners. These more active measures involve external or independent input or oversight and will take on a more summative character testing that the practitioner is not only 'up to date' but assessing if they are 'fit to practise'. Those subject to the more active appraisal and review activities will be selected based on a risk profile in which age, specialty and patient complaints are considered as potential markers of risk, or in response to an identified issue of competence.
