= Picker Institute Europe =

The Picker Institute Europe (Picker) was founded by Harvey Picker and his wife Jean in 2000. It is a not-for-profit organization dedicated to developing a patient-centred approach to healthcare. The American Picker Institute ceased operations in January 2013.

Picker has been carrying out surveys of patient experience in the National Health Service since 1998. It has been fully self-financing since 2002.

The NHS survey co-ordination centre, run by Picker, co-ordinates the NHS patient survey programmes on behalf of the Care Quality Commission.

Hospedia worked with Picker on a study in 2012, to test the efficacy of their Real-Time Patient Feedback system to collect information from patients while they were still in hospital.

Picker worked with BLISS to produce the first national survey of parents’ experiences of neonatal care which was carried out in 2010-11.

The Royal College of Paediatrics and Child Health developed their Patient Reported Experience Measure which measures the experience of paediatric patients 0–16 years in all urgent and emergency care settings with Picker in 2012.

The Institute has been critical of the Friends and Family Test.
