= Accreditation Association for Ambulatory Health Care =

American health care accreditation organization

- Industry: Accreditation
- Founded: 1979
- Headquarters: Skokie, Ill.
- Website: http://www.aaahc.org

The Accreditation Association for Ambulatory Health Care (AAAHC), founded in 1979, is an American organization which accredits ambulatory health care organizations, including ambulatory surgery centers, office-based surgery centers, endoscopy centers, and college student health centers, as well as health plans, such as health maintenance organizations and preferred provider organizations. AAAHC has been granted "deemed status" to certify ambulatory surgery centers for Medicare by the Centers for Medicare and Medicaid Services. In 2009, the AAAHC added the Medical home to the types of organizations that it accredits. It offers on-site surveys for organizations seeking Medical Home accreditation or certification.

AAAHC is one of three organizations that accredits office-based surgery practices, the others being the Joint Commission on Accreditation of Healthcare Organizations and the American Association for Accreditation of Ambulatory Surgery Facilities.

== History ==
The Accreditation Association was formed in 1979 by six member organizations including the American College Health Association, the ASC Association, and the Medical Group Management Association.

The Accreditation Association has 18 Association Members:

- Ambulatory Surgery Foundation
- American Academy of Cosmetic Surgery
- American Academy of Dental Group Practice
- American Academy of Dermatology
- American Academy of Facial Plastic and Reconstructive Surgery
- American Association of Oral and Maxillofacial Surgeons
- American College of Gastroenterology
- American College Health Association
- American College of Mohs Surgery
- American College of Obstetricians and Gynecologists
- American Dental Association
- American Gastroenterological Association
- American Society of Anesthesiologists
- American Society for Dermatologic Surgery
- American Society for Gastrointestinal Endoscopy
- Association of periOperative Registered Nurses
- Medical Group Management Association
- Society of Ambulatory Anesthesia

== See also ==
- List of healthcare accreditation organizations in the USA
