= National Patient Safety Goals =

Patient Safety Goals

The National Patient Safety Goals is a quality and patient safety improvement program established by the Joint Commission in 2003. The NPSGs were established to help accredited organizations address specific areas of concern in regards to patient safety.

== Hospital Patient Safety Goals ==
1. Identify Patients Correctly
2. Improve Effective Communication Between Staff
3. Improve the Safety of Medication Use
4. Reduce Patient Harm Associated with Medical Equipment Alarm Systems
5. Reduce and Prevent Infection
6. Identify Safety Risks for Patients Regarding Suicide
7. Improve Health Care Equity
8. Prevent Mistakes in Surgery

== Telehealth Patient Safety Goals ==
1. Identify Patients Correctly
2. Improve Staff Communication
3. Use Medicines Safely
4. Identify Patient Safety Risks for Suicide
5. Improve Health Care Equity
