= Clinical governance =

Approach to maintaining and improving quality of patient care

Clinical governance is a systematic approach to maintaining and improving the quality of patient care within the National Health Service (NHS) and private sector health care. Clinical governance became important in health care after the Bristol heart scandal in 1995, during which an anaesthetist, Dr Stephen Bolsin, exposed the high mortality rate for paediatric cardiac surgery at the Bristol Royal Infirmary. It was originally elaborated within the United Kingdom National Health Service (NHS), and its most widely cited formal definition describes it as:

A framework through which NHS organisations are accountable for continually improving the quality of their services and safeguarding high standards of care by creating an environment in which excellence in clinical care will flourish.

This definition is intended to embody three key attributes: recognisably high standards of care, transparent responsibility and accountability for those standards, and a constant dynamic of improvement.

The concept has some parallels with the more widely known corporate governance, in that it addresses those structures, systems and processes that assure the quality, accountability and proper management of an organisation's operation and delivery of service. However clinical governance applies only to health and social care organisations, and only those aspects of such organisations that relate to the delivery of care to patients and their carers; it is not concerned with the other business processes of the organisation except insofar as they affect the delivery of care. The concept of "integrated governance" has emerged to refer jointly to the corporate governance and clinical governance duties of healthcare organisations.

Prior to 1999, the principal statutory responsibilities of UK NHS Trust Boards were to ensure proper financial management of the organisation and an acceptable level of patient safety. Trust Boards had no statutory duty to ensure a particular level of quality. Maintaining and improving the quality of care was understood to be the responsibility of the relevant clinical professions. In 1999, Trust Boards assumed a legal responsibility for quality of care that is equal in measure to their other statutory duties. Clinical governance is the mechanism by which that responsibility is discharged.

"Clinical governance" does not mandate any particular structure, system or process for maintaining and improving the quality of care, except that designated responsibility for clinical governance must exist at Trust Board level, and that each Trust must prepare an Annual Review of Clinical Governance to report on quality of care and its maintenance. Beyond that, the Trust and its various clinical departments are obliged to interpret the principle of clinical governance into locally appropriate structures, processes, roles and responsibilities.

== Elements ==
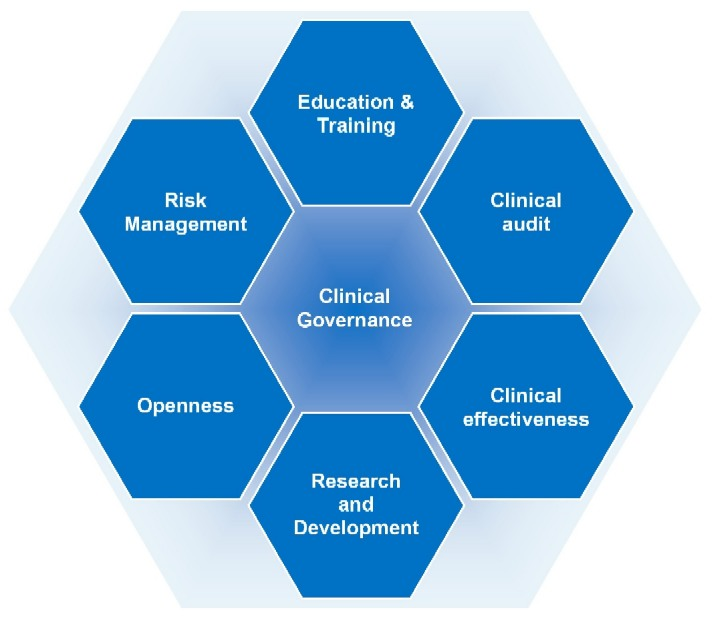
Clinical governance is an aggregation of service improvement processes that are regulated by a single ideology.

Clinical governance is composed of at least the following elements:

- Education and Training
- Clinical audit
- Clinical effectiveness
- Research and development
- Openness
- Risk management
- Information Management

=== Education and training ===
It is no longer considered acceptable for any clinician to abstain from continuing education after qualification – too much of what is learned during training becomes quickly outdated. In NHS Trusts, the continuing professional development (CPD) of clinicians has been the responsibility of the Trust and it has also been the professional duty of clinicians to remain up-to-date.

=== Clinical audit ===
Clinical audit is the review of clinical performance, the refining of clinical practice as a result and the measurement of performance against agreed standards – a cyclical process of improving the quality of clinical care. In one form or another, audit has been part of good clinical practice for generations. Whilst audit has been a requirement of NHS Trust employees, in primary care clinical audit has only been encouraged, where audit time has had to compete with other priorities.

=== Clinical effectiveness ===
Clinical effectiveness is a measure of the extent to which a particular intervention works. The measure on its own is useful, but decisions are enhanced by considering additional factors, such as whether the intervention is appropriate and whether it represents value for money. In the modern health service, clinical practice needs to be refined in the light of emerging evidence of effectiveness but also has to consider aspects of efficiency and safety from the perspective of the individual patient and carers in the wider community.

=== Research and development ===
A good professional practice is to always seek to change in the light of evidence-led research. The time lag for introducing such change can be substantial, thus reducing the time lag and associated morbidity requires emphasis not only on carrying out research but also on efficiently implementing said research. Techniques such as critical appraisal of the literature, project management and the development of guidelines, protocols and implementation strategies are all tools for promoting the implementation of research practice.

=== Openness ===
Poor performance and poor practice can too often thrive behind closed doors. Processes which are open to public scrutiny, while respecting individual patient and practitioner confidentiality, and which can be justified openly, are an essential part of quality assurance. Open proceedings and discussion about clinical governance issues should be a feature of the framework.

Any organisation providing high quality care has to show that it is meeting the needs of the population it serves. Health needs assessment and understanding the problems and aspirations of the community requires the cooperation between NHS organisations, public health department. Legislations contribute to this.

The system of clinical governance brings together all the elements which seek to promote quality of care.

=== Risk management ===
Risk management involves consideration of the following components:

Risks to patients: compliance with statutory regulations can help to minimise risks to patients. In addition, patient risks can be minimised by ensuring that systems are regularly reviewed and questioned – for example, by critical event audit and learning from complaints. Medical ethical standards are also a key factor in maintaining patient and public safety and well-being.

Risks to practitioners: ensuring that healthcare professionals are immunised against infectious diseases, working in a safe environment (e.g. safety in acute mental health units, promoting an anti-harassment culture) and are kept up-to-date on important parts of quality assurance. Furthermore, keeping healthcare professionals up to date with guidelines such as fire safety, basic life support (BLS) and local trust updates is also important, these can be annually or more frequent depending on risk stratification.

Risks to the organisation: poor quality is a threat to any organisation. In addition to reducing risks to patients and practitioners, organisations need to reduce their own risks by ensuring high quality employment practice (including locum procedures and reviews of individual and team performance), a safe environment (including estates and privacy), and well designed policies on public involvement.

Balancing these risk components may be an ideal that is difficult to achieve in practice. Recent research by Fischer and colleagues at the University of Oxford finds that tensions between 'first order' risks (based on clinical care) and 'second order' risks (based on organisational reputation) can produce unintended contradictions, conflict, and may even precipitate organisational crisis.

=== Information management ===
Information management in health: Patient records (demographic, Socioeconomic, Clinical information) proper collection, management and use of information within healthcare systems will determine the system's effectiveness in detecting health problems, defining priorities, identifying innovative solutions and allocating resources to improve health outcomes.

== Application in the field ==
If clinical governance is to truly function effectively as a systematic approach to maintaining and improving the quality of patient care within a health system, it requires advocates. It also requires systems and people to be in place to promote and develop it.

The system has found supporters outside of the UK. The not-for-profit UK hospital accreditation group the Trent Accreditation Scheme base their system upon NHS clinical governance, and apply it to hospitals in Hong Kong and Malta. Also in the Spanish National Health Service several experiences has been implemented, such the ones in Andalucía and Asturias.
