= Accreditation Commission for Health Care =

The Accreditation Commission for Health Care (ACHC) is a United States-based non-profit health care accrediting organization. It represents an alternative to the Joint Commission and CHAP, The Community Health Accreditation Program.

ACHC was established in 1985 by home care health providers to create an accreditation option which was more focused on the needs of small providers. The process began in Raleigh, North Carolina, with the group incorporated in August 1986. The first accredited organization was awarded certification in January 1987. The company began offering services on a national level in 1996. Today, ACHC offers nineteen accreditation programs, nine of which are CMS approved (Acute Care Hospital, Ambulatory Surgery Center, Clinical Laboratory, Critical Access Hospital, DMEPOS, Home Health, Home Infusion Therapy, Hospice, Renal Dialysis).

- Acute Care Hospital
- Ambulatory Care
- Ambulatory Surgery Center
- Assisted Living
- Behavioral Health
- Clinical Laboratory
- Critical Access Hospital
- Dentistry
- DMEPOS
- Home Care (Private Duty)
- Home Health
- Home Infusion Therapy
- Hospice
- Office-Based Surgery
- Palliative Care
- PCAB (Compounding)
- Pharmacy
- Renal Dialysis
- Sleep

The accreditation process for laboratories follows a two-year cycle, all other programs follow a three-year cycle.

In early 2013, ACHC moved to headquarters in Cary, North Carolina. It welcomed its new CEO, José Domingos, and it launched its Behavioral Health Program.

== CMS/Regulatory ==
In November 2006, the Centers for Medicare & Medicaid Services (CMS) approved ACHC to accredit suppliers of durable medical equipment, prosthetics, orthotics and supplies (DMEPOS) as meeting new quality standards under Medicare Part B.

In January 2009, the Centers for Medicare & Medicaid Services (CMS) announced the approval of the ACHC for continued Deeming Authority for Home Health Agencies through 2015. Initial approval of Deeming Authority of ACHC for Home Health Agencies was granted in February 2006.

On November 27, 2009, ACHC was recognized by the Centers for Medicare & Medicaid Services (CMS) as a national accreditation organization for Hospices that request participation in the Medicare program.

== See also ==
- International healthcare accreditation
- List of healthcare accreditation organisations in the United States
- Patient safety
- Patient safety organization
