= Healthcare Facilities Accreditation Program =

U.S. not-for-profit organization

The Healthcare Facilities Accreditation Program (HFAP) is a not-for-profit organization meant to help healthcare organizations maintain their standards in patient care and comply with regulations and the healthcare environment. Headquartered in Chicago, HFAP is an accreditation organization with authority from Centers for Medicare and Medicaid Services.

HFAP provides accreditation programs for hospitals, clinical laboratories, ambulatory surgical centers, office based surgery, and critical access hospitals. HFAP also accredits mental health and physical rehabilitation facilities and provides certification for primary stroke centers. HFAP was founded in 1943 by the American Osteopathic Association, a medical organization representing osteopathic physicians.

== History ==
HFAP was established in 1943 by the American Osteopathic Association (AOA), and began surveying hospitals in 1945. Initially, HFAP provided osteopathic hospitals with accreditation ensuring osteopathic residents received appropriate training. In the mid-1960s the United States Congress decided that accredited hospitals would meet conditions set for participation, and thus automatically participated in newly established Medicare and Medicaid programs. HFAP quickly applied for and was granted said status in 1965. By 2012, HFAP accredited about 214 hospitals in the US. In 2015, ownership of HFAP moved from the AOA to the Accreditation Association for Hospitals/Health Systems (AAHHS).
