= Joint Commission =

U.S. health care accreditation association

The Joint Commission
- Type: Non-profit organization
- Industry: Health care
- Founded: 1951
- Headquarters: Oakbrook Terrace, Illinois, United States
- Area served: Worldwide
- Revenue: 208,910,907 United States dollar (2022)
- Total assets: 334,608,248 United States dollar (2022)
- Website: www.jointcommission.org

The Joint Commission is a United States-based nonprofit tax-exempt 501(c) organization that accredits more than 22,000 US health care organizations and programs. The international branch accredits medical services from around the world.

A majority of US state governments recognize Joint Commission accreditation as a condition of licensure for the receipt of Medicaid and Medicare reimbursements.

The Joint Commission is based in the Chicago suburb of Oakbrook Terrace, Illinois.

== History ==
The Joint Commission was formerly the Joint Commission on Accreditation of Healthcare Organizations (JCAHO) and previous to that the Joint Commission on Accreditation of Hospitals (JCAH).

The Joint Commission was renamed The Joint Commission on Accreditation of Hospitals in 1951, but it was not until 1965, when the federal government decided that a hospital meeting Joint Commission accreditation met the Medicare Conditions of Participation, that accreditation had any official impact. However, Section 125 of the Medicare Improvements for Patients and Providers Act of 2008 (MIPPA) removed the Joint Commission's statutorily-guaranteed accreditation authority for hospitals, effective July 15, 2010. At that time, the Joint Commission's hospital accreditation program would be subject to Centers for Medicare and Medicaid Services (CMS) requirements for organizations seeking accrediting authority. To avoid a lapse in accrediting authority, the Joint Commission would have to submit an application for hospital accrediting authority consistent with these requirements and within a time frame that would enable CMS to review and evaluate their submission. CMS would make the decision to grant deeming authority and determine the term.

The Joint Commission's predecessor organization grew from the efforts of Ernest Codman to promote hospital reform based on outcomes management in patient care. Codman's efforts led to the founding of the American College of Surgeons Hospital Standardization Program. In 1951 the Joint Commission on Accreditation of Hospitals was created by merging the Hospital Standardization Program with similar programs run by the American College of Physicians, the American Hospital Association, the American Medical Association, and the Canadian Medical Association. In 1987 the company was renamed the Joint Commission on Accreditation of Healthcare Organizations (JCAHO, pronounced "Jay-co"). In 2007 the Joint Commission on Accreditation of Healthcare Organizations underwent a major rebranding and simplified its name to The Joint Commission. The rebranding included the name, logo, and tag line change to "Helping Health Care Organizations Help Patients."

The change was part of an effort to make the name more memorable and to assist the commission in its continued responsiveness to the needs of organizations seeking fee-based accreditation. The Joint Commission advocates the use of patient safety measures, the spread of information, the measurement of performance, and the introduction of public policy recommendations.

Joint Commission International (JCI) was established in 1998 as a division of Joint Commission Resources, Inc. (JCR), a not-for-profit, private affiliate of the Joint Commission. Through international accreditation, consultation, publications, and education programs, JCI extends The Joint Commission's mission worldwide by helping to improve the quality of patient care; assisting international health care organizations, public health agencies, health ministries, and others in evaluating, improving, and demonstrating the quality of patient care; and enhancing patient safety in more than 60 countries. International hospitals may seek accreditation to demonstrate quality, and JCI accreditation may be considered a seal of approval by medical travelers from the U.S.

== Operation ==
All member health care organizations are subject to a three-year accreditation cycle, and laboratories are surveyed every two years. The organization does not make its hospital survey findings public. However, it does provide the organization's accreditation decision, the date that accreditation was awarded, and any standards that were cited for improvement. Organizations deemed to be in compliance with all or most of the applicable standards are awarded the decision of Accreditation.

The unannounced full survey is a key component of The Joint Commission accreditation process. "Unannounced" means the organization does not receive advanced notice of its survey date. The Joint Commission began conducting unannounced surveys on January 1, 2006. Surveys occur 18 to 39 months after the organization's previous unannounced survey.

There has been criticism in the past within the U.S. about how The Joint Commission operates. The commission's practice had been to notify hospitals in advance of the timing of inspections. A 2005 article in The Washington Post noted that about 99% of inspected hospitals are accredited, and serious problems in the delivery of care are sometimes overlooked or missed. Similar concerns have been expressed by the Boston Globe who stated "The Joint Commission, whose governing board has long been dominated by representatives of the industries it inspects, has been the target of criticism about the validity of its evaluations." The Joint Commission over time has responded to these criticisms. However, when it comes to the international dimension, surveys undertaken by JCI still take place at a time known in advance by the hospitals being surveyed, often after considerable preparation by those hospitals.

Preparing for a Joint Commission survey can be a challenging process for any healthcare provider. At a minimum, a hospital must be completely familiar with the current standards; examine current processes, policies, and procedures relative to the standards; and prepare to improve any areas that are not currently in compliance. The hospital must be in compliance with the standards for at least four months prior to the initial survey. The hospital should also be in compliance with applicable standards during the entire period of accreditation, which means that surveyors will look for a full three years of implementation for several standards-related issues.

Behavioral health organizations looking to be accredited under the standards outlined in the Comprehensive Accreditation Manual for Behavioral Health Care (CAMBHC) do not have the same requirements around compliance with applicable standards for any period of time leading up to an initial survey for accreditation. The Joint Commission also provides behavioral health organizations that are being surveyed for the first time with a 30-day notice of their survey date, however, future surveys are unannounced.

The Joint Commission and JCI employ salaried individuals as surveyors who generally work or have worked within health care services but are able to devote half or less of their time for the accrediting organization. The surveyors travel to health care organizations to evaluate their operational practices and facilities against established Joint Commission standards and elements of performance.

Substantial time and resources are devoted by health care organizations ranging from medical equipment suppliers and staffing firms to tertiary care academic medical centers to prepare for and undergo Joint Commission surveys. There is growing concern, however, over the lack of verifiable progress towards meeting the organization's stated goals. Although The Joint Commission increasingly cites and demands "evidence-based medicine" in its regulatory requirements, there is a relative paucity of evidence demonstrating any significant quality improvement due to its efforts, while there is a growing body of literature showing no improvement or actual deterioration in quality despite the increasingly stringent and expensive requirements.

A facility requesting accreditation pays a substantial fee to the Joint Commission (the "accrediting" agency) and, upon receiving a "passing" grade, is able to purchase associated mementos of accomplishment to display to the public.

=== Costs and finances ===
The nonprofit's revenue was $147M in 2013, and in that fiscal year, it paid its CEO more than $1M. Hospitals pay The Joint Commission up to $37,000 in fees annually to maintain their accreditation status. Inspections cost approximately $18,000 every three years.

== Alternatives in the United States ==
The Joint Commission is not a complete monopoly, and while many states in the U.S. make use of their services, they are not used by all. Some states have set up their own alternative assessment procedures; The Joint Commission is not recognized for state licensure in the states of Oklahoma (except for hospital-based outpatient mental health services), Pennsylvania, and Wisconsin. In California, The Joint Commission is part of a joint survey process with state authorities.

There are also other healthcare accreditation organizations in the U.S. unrelated to The Joint Commission. These include Accreditation Commission for Health Care, Inc. (ACHC), the American Osteopathic Association (AOA), the Commission on Accreditation of Rehabilitation Facilities (CARF), the Community Health Accreditation Program (CHAP), the "Exemplary Provider Program" of The Compliance Team, the Healthcare Facilities Accreditation Program (HFAP), the National Commission on Correctional Health Care, Utilization Review Accreditation Commission (URAC), The National Dialysis Accreditation Commission and the Healthcare Quality Association on Accreditation (HQAA) who are recognised in the state of Ohio.

The Healthcare Facilities Accreditation Program (HFAP) has been in operation since 1945.

On September 26, 2008, the Centers for Medicare and Medicaid Services (CMS) granted deeming authority for hospitals to DNV Healthcare Inc. (DNVHC), an operating company of Det Norske Veritas (DNV), a Norwegian international company that has been operating in the U.S. since 1898.

The Center for Improvement in Healthcare Quality (CIHQ), based in Round Rock, Texas, was granted deeming authority for hospitals by the CMS In July 2013.

== Goals and initiatives ==
The stated mission of The Joint Commission is: "To continuously improve health care for the public, in collaboration with other stakeholders, by evaluating health care organizations and inspiring them to excel in providing safe and effective care of the highest quality and value."

The company updates its accreditation standards, expands patient safety goals on a yearly basis, and posts them on its web site for all interested persons to review making the information and process transparent to all stakeholders ranging from institutions and practitioners to patients and their advocates. Residential treatment centers and medical care facilities often share their accreditation status with their patients.

The purpose of The Joint Commission's National Patient Safety Goals (NPSGs) is to promote specific improvements in patient safety. The NPSGs highlight problematic areas in health care and describe evidence and expert-based solutions to these problems. Recognizing that sound system design is intrinsic to the delivery of safe, high quality health care. The Goals focus on system-wide solutions, wherever possible. The NPSGs have become a critical method by which The Joint Commission promotes and enforces major changes in patient safety or thousands of participating health care organizations in the United States and around the world. The 2009 NPSGs included regulations targeting the spread of infection due to multidrug-resistant organisms, catheter-related bloodstream infections (CRBSI), and surgical site infections (SSI). The new regulations for CRBSI and SSI prevention apply not only to hospitals, but also to ambulatory care and ambulatory surgery centers. Engaging patients in patient safety efforts is also a major new component of the NPSGs. The Universal Protocol to reduce surgical errors and existing regulations on medication reconciliation have been modified for 2009, based on feedback received by The Joint Commission.

== International healthcare accreditation ==
Joint Commission International, or JCI is one group that provides international health care accreditation services to hospitals around the world and brings income into the U.S.-based parent organization. This not-for-profit tax-exempt private corporation (a 501(c) organization) currently accredits hospitals in Asia, Europe, the Middle East, Africa, and South America and is seeking to expand its business further.

The JCI has a small staff which includes principal consultants and a number of other consultants from around the world.

=== Cost of accreditation ===
JCI quotes an average fee of $46,000 per year to maintain accreditation, plus travel and other costs.

For hospital to be successful in the accreditation process, there may be additional costs related to consultancy work prior to accreditation.

International accreditors incur different levels of costs with some costing less than JCI.

== Criticisms ==
A Harvard University-led research study published in the BMJ found that U.S. hospital accreditation by independent organizations was not associated with lower mortality or with reduced readmission rates for common medical conditions. The authors concluded that there was no advantage for patients to choose a hospital accredited by The Joint Commission over a hospital accredited by another independent accrediting organization. The Wall Street Journal suggested that the underlying reasons for this is the failure of The Joint Commission to revoke or modify the accreditation status of hospitals with major infractions considered to be so significant they caused, or were likely to cause, a risk of serious injury or death to patients.

=== Role in opioid epidemic ===
In 2001, the Joint Commission mandated that health care providers assess every patient's pain during each clinical encounter on a scale of 0 to 10. This created an expectation that health care providers lower the pain of patients, leading health care providers to increasingly use opioids. Critics of the Joint Commission attribute a role for the organization in the opioid epidemic.

=== COLA accreditation ===
In December 2022, TJC announced they would no longer recognize Commission on Office Laboratory Accreditation (COLA) for lab accreditation as of January 1, 2023 and facilities would have until December 31, 2024 to transition to a CAP or TJC accreditation. With the COVID-driven inspection backlog and a lack of inspectors, the move was criticized as being purely a financially driven attempt to capture additional market share. No reason for the change was given by TJC or COLA. TJC had originally begun recognizing COLA accreditation in 1997.

== See also ==
- Patient safety
- Patient safety organization
- URAC
- Hospital accreditation
- List of International Healthcare Accreditation Organizations
- Evidence-based medicine
- Medical ethics
