= National coverage determination =

A national coverage determination (NCD) is a United States nationwide determination of whether Medicare will pay for an item or service. It is a form of utilization management and forms a medical guideline on treatment.

Medicare coverage is limited to items and services that are considered "reasonable and necessary" for the diagnosis or treatment of an illness or injury (and within the scope of a Medicare benefit category).

In the absence of a NCD, an item or service is covered at the discretion of the Medicare administrative contractors (MACs) based on a local coverage determination (LCD). As of 2015, local coverage determinations only become public on an appeal, and do not set a precedent.

== What triggers an NCD? ==
NCDs can be requested by external parties who identify an item or service as a potential benefit (or to prevent potential harm) to Medicare beneficiaries. External parties who may request an NCD are Medicare beneficiaries, manufacturers, providers, suppliers, medical professional associations, or health plans.

NCDs can also be internally generated by the Centers for Medicare and Medicaid Services (CMS) under multiple circumstances.

For existing items or services

- Stakeholders have raised significant questions about health benefits of currently covered items or services
- New evidence, or re-interpretation of previously available evidence indicates that current policies may need to be changed
- Local coverage policies are inconsistent or conflicting, to the detriment of beneficiaries

For new items or services

- The technology represents a substantial clinical advance and is likely to result in significant health benefit if it is available more rapidly to patients for whom it is indicated
- More rapid access is likely to have a significant programmatic impact on Medicare policies
- Significant uncertainty exists around health benefits, patient selection, or appropriate facility and staffing requirements

== The NCD decision process ==
The NCD development process generally takes 6–9 months, depending on the need for external technology assessments or coverage advisory committee reviews. For NCD requests that do not require these assessments/reviews, the entire NCD decision will be made no more than 6 months after the date the request is received.
Phases during the first 6 months:

- Preliminary Discussions
- Benefit Category
- National Coverage Request
- Staff Review
- External Technology Assessment and/or Medicare Coverage Advisory Committee
- Staff Review
- Draft Decision and Memorandum Posted

Phases during last 3 months

- Public Comments (30 days)
- Final Decision Memorandum and Implementation Instructions (must be completed in 60 days)

== Relationship of NCDs and LCDs ==
NCDs are binding on Medicare administrative contractors (MACs), qualified independent contractors (QICs), administrative law judges and attorney adjudicators, and the Medicare Appeals Council. LCD policy can be no more restrictive than the NCD, although it can be less restrictive. If an NCD or other coverage provision states that an item is "covered for diagnoses/conditions A, B and C", MACs should not use that as a basis to develop an LCD to cover only "diagnoses/conditions A, B and C". When an NCD does not exclude coverage for other diagnoses/conditions, MACs should allow individual consideration, unless the LCD supports automatic denial of some or all of those other diagnoses/conditions. When national policy bases coverage on need assessment by the beneficiary's provider, LCDs should not include prerequisites.

== Evaluating LCDs for NCD consideration ==
CMS is required (under the MMA) to evaluate LCDs to decide which decisions should be adopted nationally. When new LCDs are developed, a 731 Advisory Group reviews LCD topic submissions to determine which topics are forwarded to the CMS Coverage and Analysis Group (CAG).

To promote consistency across LCDs, CMS requires MACs to:

- Consult with other MACs prior to developing a new policy
- Adopt or adapt existing LCDs when possible
