= Certified Community Behavioral Health Clinic =

A Certified Community Behavioral Health Clinic (CCBHC) is a type of health clinic in the United States that treats mental health and substance abuse disorders regardless of the patient's health insurance status and ability to pay for care. A CCBHC is funded through Medicaid or SAMHSA grants.

A private, for-profit clinic or organization is not eligible to become a CCBHC, but can enter into a formal agreement with a CCBHC to become a “designated collaborating organization” (DCO).

In 2017, eight states participated in a demonstration program following the passage of the Excellence in Mental Health Care Act, which was part of the Protecting Access to Medicare Act of 2014. As a result, CCBHCs were formed, with over 500 CCBHCs are operating across the US in every state except Delaware, North Dakota, South Dakota, and South Carolina.

== See also ==
- Substance Abuse and Mental Health Services Administration
- Centers for Disease Control and Prevention timeline
- Health in the United States
- Health Care and Education Reconciliation Act of 2010
- Harm reduction in the United States
- Protecting Access to Medicare Act of 2014
