= Mazel =

Mazel is a surname. Notable people with the surname include:

- Eugène Mazel (1828–1890), French amateur botanist
- Hélène Robert-Mazel (active 1832-1857), French composer, pianist, singer and teacher
- Ilya Mazel (a.k.a. Ruvim Mazel, 1890–1967), Soviet painter
- Isaak Mazel (1911–1945), Soviet chess master
- Judy Mazel (1943–2007), American weight loss advocate and author of The Beverly Hills Diet
- Maurice Mazel, prominent Chicago surgeon who founded Edgewater Hospital
- Olivier Mazel (1858–1940), French Army general during World War I
- Zvi Mazel (born 1939), Israeli diplomat

== See also ==
- Mazel Group Engineering, a Barcelona based design studio specialising in concept cars and engineering solutions
- Mazel tov
- Maazel
- Mazenzele, Flemish village in the Belgian province Flemish-Brabant
