= Lifetime reserve days =

Lifetime reserve days are additional days that the United States health care system Medicare Part A will pay for when a beneficiary is in a hospital for more than 90 days during a benefit period. Beneficiaries are limited to a total of 60 reserve days over the course of their life.
