= SGR Repeal and Medicare Provider Payment Modernization Act of 2014 =

- Long title: To amend title XVIII of the Social Security Act to repeal the Medicare sustainable growth rate and improve Medicare payments for physicians and other professionals, and for other purposes.
- Announced in: the 113th United States Congress
- Sponsored by: Rep. Michael C. Burgess (R-TX)

Legislative history
- Introduced in the House as H.R. 4015 by Rep. Michael C. Burgess (R-TX) on February 6, 2014; Committee consideration by United States House Committee on the Judiciary, United States House Committee on Ways and Means, United States House Committee on Energy and Commerce

The SGR Repeal and Medicare Provider Payment Modernization Act of 2014 (H.R. 4015) is a bill that would replace the Sustainable Growth Rate (SGR) formula, which determines the annual updates to payment rates for physicians’ services in Medicare, with new systems for establishing those payment rates.

The bill was introduced into the United States House of Representatives during the 113th United States Congress. The provisions in this bill that would pay for changes in the SGR formula by delaying some provisions of the Affordable Care Act were unpopular with Democrats, leading to the Protecting Access to Medicare Act of 2014 (H.R. 4302; 113th Congress), a bill that would simply delay the April 1, 2014 SGR Medicare cuts until March 2015.

== Background ==
In the United States, Medicare is a national social insurance program, administered by the U.S. federal government since 1966, that guarantees access to health insurance for Americans aged 65 and older who have worked and paid into the system, younger people with disabilities, and a few other groups. As a social insurance program, Medicare spreads the financial risk associated with illness across society to protect everyone, and thus has a somewhat different social role from for-profit private insurers, which manage their risk portfolio by adjusting their pricing according to perceived risk.

In 2010, Medicare provided health insurance to 48 million Americans—40 million people age 65 and older and eight million younger people with disabilities. It was the primary payer for an estimated 15.3 million inpatient stays in 2011, representing 47.2 percent ($182.7 billion) of total aggregate inpatient hospital costs in the United States. On average, Medicare covers about half (48 percent) of health care costs for enrollees. Medicare enrollees must cover the rest of the cost. These out-of-pocket costs vary depending on the amount of health care a Medicare enrollee needs. They might include uncovered services—such as long-term, dental, hearing, and vision care—and supplemental insurance.

Over the last decade, Congress has been passing legislation to temporarily fix the Medicare payment system to avoid the major cuts that would otherwise go into effect due to existing law.

== Provisions of the bill ==
This summary is based largely on the summary provided by the Congressional Research Service, a public domain source.

The SGR Repeal and Medicare Provider Payment Modernization Act of 2014 would amend title XVIII (Medicare) of the Social Security Act (SSA) to: (1) end and remove sustainable growth rate (SGR) methodology from the determination of annual conversion factors in the formula for payment for physicians' services; (2) establish an update to the single conversion factor for 2014 through 2018 of 0.5%, (3) freeze the update to the single conversion factor at 0.00% for 2019 through 2023, and (4) establish an update of 1% for health professionals participating in alternative payment models (APMs) and an update of 0.5% for all other health professionals after 2023.

The bill would direct the Medicare Payment Advisory Commission (MEDPAC) to report to Congress on the relationship between: (1) physician and other health professional utilization and expenditures (and their rate of increase) of items and services for which Medicare payment is made, and (2) total utilization and expenditures (and their rate of increase) under Medicare parts A (Hospital Insurance), B (Supplementary Medical Insurance), and D (Voluntary Prescription Drug Benefit Program).

The bill would direct MEDPAC to report to Congress on: (1) the payment update for professional services applied under Medicare for 2014 through 2018, (2) the effect of such update on the efficiency, economy, and quality of care provided under such program, (3) the effect of such update on ensuring a sufficient number of providers to maintain access to care by Medicare beneficiaries, and (4) recommendations for any future payment updates for professional services under such program to ensure adequate access to care is maintained for Medicare beneficiaries.

The bill would revise and consolidates components of the three specified existing performance incentive programs into a merit-based incentive payment system (MIPS) the Secretary of Health and Human Services (HHS) is directed to establish, under which MIPS-eligible professionals (excluding most Alternative Payment Model [APM] participants) receive annual payment increases or decreases based on their performance. Applies the MIPS program to payments for items and services furnished on or after January 1, 2018.

The bill would require specified incentive payments to be made to eligible partial qualifying APM participants.

The bill would direct the Secretary to make available on the Physician Compare website of the Centers for Medicare & Medicaid Services (CMS) certain information, including information regarding the performance of MIPS-eligible professionals.

The bill would require the Comptroller General (GAO) to evaluate the MIPS program.

The bill would require GAO to submit to Congress a report that: (1) compares the similarities and differences in the use of quality measures under the original Medicare fee-for-service programs, the Medicare Advantage (MA) program under Medicare part C (Medicare+Choice), selected state Medicaid programs, and private payer arrangements; and (2) make recommendations on how to reduce the administrative burden involved in applying such quality measures.

The bill would direct GAO to report to Congress on: (1) whether entities that pool financial risk for physician services can play a role in supporting physician practices in assuming financial risk for treatment of patients, and (2) the transition to an APM of professionals in rural areas, health professional shortage areas, or medically underserved areas.

The bill would establish the Payment Model Technical Advisory Committee to make recommendations to the Secretary on physician-focused payment models.

The bill would require the Secretary to study: (1) the application of federal fraud prevention laws related to APMs; (2) the effect of individuals' socioeconomic status on quality and resource use outcome measures for individuals under Medicare; and (3) the impact of risk factors, race, health literacy, limited English proficiency (LEP), and patient activation, on quality and resource use outcome measures under Medicare.

The bill would direct the Secretary to: (1) post on the CMS Internet website a draft plan for the development of quality measures to assess professionals, (2) establish new Healthcare Common Procedure Coding System (HCPCS) codes for chronic care management services, and (3) conduct an education and outreach campaign to inform professionals who furnish items and services under Medicare part B and Medicare part B enrollees of the benefits of chronic care management services.

The bill would authorize the Secretary to: (1) collect and use information on the resources directly or indirectly related to physicians' services in the determination of relative values under the Medicare physician fee schedule; and (2) establish or adjust practice expense relative values using cost, charge, or other data from suppliers or service providers.

The bill would revise and expands factors for identification of potentially misvalued codes. Sets an annual target for relative value adjustments for misvalued services. Phases-in of significant relative value unit (RVU) reductions.

The bill would direct GAO to study the processes used by the Relative Value Scale Update Committee (RUC) to make recommendations to the Secretary regarding relative values for specific services under the Medicare physician fee schedule.

The bill would make Metropolitan Statistical Areas in California fee schedule areas for Medicare payments.

The bill would direct the Secretary to: (1) establish a program to promote the use of appropriate use criteria for certain imaging services furnished by ordering professionals and furnishing professionals, and (2) make publicly available on the CMS Physician Compare website specified information with respect to eligible professionals.

The bill would expand the kinds and uses of data available to qualified entities for quality improvement activities.

The bill would direct the Secretary to provide Medicare data to qualified clinical data registries to facilitate quality improvement or patient safety.

The bill would permit continuing automatic extensions of a Medicare physician and practitioner election to opt out of the Medicare physician payment system into private contracts.

The bill would direct the Secretary to: (1) make publicly available through an appropriate publicly accessible website information on the number and characteristics of opt-out physicians and practitioners, and (2) report to Congress recommendations to amend existing fraud and abuse laws, through exceptions, safe harbors, or other narrowly targeted provisions, to permit gainsharing or similar arrangements between physicians and hospitals that improve care while reducing waste and increasing efficiency.

The bill would declare it a national objective to achieve widespread exchange of health information through interoperable certified electronic health record (EHR) technology nationwide by December 31, 2017, as a consequence of a significant federal investment in the implementation of health information technology through the Medicare and Medicaid EHR programs.

The bill would direct the Secretary to study the feasibility of establishing mechanisms that includes aggregated results of surveys of meaningful EHR users on the functionality of certified EHR products to enable such users to compare directly the functionality and other features of such products.

The bill would require GAO studies on the use of telehealth under federal programs and on remote patient monitoring services.

== Congressional Budget Office report ==
This summary is based largely on the summary provided by the Congressional Budget Office, as introduced on February 6, 2014. This is a public domain source.

H.R. 4015 would replace the Sustainable Growth Rate (SGR) formula, which determines the annual updates to payment rates for physicians’ services in Medicare, with new systems for establishing those payment rates. The Congressional Budget Office (CBO) estimates that enacting H.R. 4015 would increase direct spending by about $138 billion over the 2014-2024 period, as shown in the following table. This estimate is relative to the CBO’s February 2014 baseline projections of spending under current law. (The legislation would not affect federal revenues or spending subject to appropriation.) The costs of this legislation fall within budget functions 570 (Medicare) and 550 (health).

== Procedural history ==
The SGR Repeal and Medicare Provider Payment Modernization Act of 2014 was introduced into the United States House of Representatives on February 6, 2014 by Rep. Michael C. Burgess (R-TX). It was referred to the United States House Committee on the Judiciary, the United States House Committee on Ways and Means, and the United States House Committee on Energy and Commerce. On March 7, 2014, House Majority Leader Eric Cantor announced that H.R. 4015 would be considered on March 14, 2014.

== Debate and discussion ==
The American Medical Association's president Ardis Dee Hoven argued strongly in favor of the bill, calling the current SGR "fiscally foolish" and "fatally-flawed." According to Dr. Hoven, the costs associated with caring for seniors have risen 25 percent since 2001, but Medicare payments to doctors have not even increased 4 percent over the same time period.

The Medicare portions of the bill had broad support and reflected a year's worth of debate and negotiation. However, House Republicans attached provisions to delay the individual mandate for five years to the bill, arguing that people should not have to buy insurance or pay a fine due to the wide variety of delays and exemptions that businesses had received. Delaying the individual mandated would also have the unexpected effect of saving the government money, since fewer people would sign up and would require fewer subsidies to pay for their insurance. The proposal to pay for the expensive change to the Medicare payment system by delaying the individual mandate was made by Rep. Dave Camp (R-MI). This action, according to the Congressional Budget Office, would save the government $170 billion.

President Barack Obama announced his opposition to the bill and threatened to veto it. According to the Administration's statement, Obama favored the changes to Medicare but objected to the bill's inclusion of provisions that would delay the individual mandate from the Affordable Care Act by five years.

Democrats, such as House Minority Whip Steny Hoyer (D-MD), accused the Republicans of turning "bipartisan agreement into partisan confrontation."

== See also ==
- List of bills in the 113th United States Congress
- Protecting Access to Medicare Act of 2014 (H.R. 4302; 113th Congress)
- Medicare Sustainable Growth Rate
