= Medicare Quality Cancer Care Demonstration Act =

United States law

The Medicare Quality Cancer Care Demonstration Act of 2009 (H.R. 2872) in the United States is a federal program designed to improve the quality of cancer care for elderly individuals covered by Medicare, with a particular focus on approximately 45% of cancer patients who are beneficiaries of the Medicare program.

== History and overview ==
This legislation for the Medicare Quality Cancer Care Demonstration Act was proposed in the US congress by Congressman Artur Davis (D-AL), with co-sponsorship from Representatives Steve Israel (D-NY) and Mary Jo Kilroy (D-OH), aims to enhance the quality of care for seniors while also addressing cost control measures.

By the Medicare payment system, H.R. 2872 calls for national reporting of key metrics of evidence-based care, and also refines those metrics; develops new Medicare performance-based reimbursement system that is patient-centric and quality driven, while aligning better with cost control.

The bill includes the following elements:

- Establish a national Medicare demonstration project implemented by the Centers for Medicare & Medicaid Services (CMS) and is open to all oncology practices.
- Address current shortcomings in treatment planning and end-of-life care by improving metrics and aligning incentives relating to the care.
- Quality reporting measures by oncologists through the Medicare reimbursement system, concerning their treatment plans and end-of-life care. It would also include refinement and improvement of these plans.
- Allocate $300 million per year in Medicare funding to revise the Medicare payment system. Those payments would be based on quality and cost-efficiency.
- Incorporate the key elements under discussion in the healthcare reform debate — quality care delivery, evidence-based medicine, care coordination, patient-centric, cost control, health information technology, and pay-for-performance — in producing an evolved payment system.
- Evaluation of QCCD to determine the participation of oncologists and cost-effectiveness of the plan.
- Conducting of a demonstration project over a period of not less than two years to allow for improvement in reporting, metrics, and analysis.
- A substantive project that can be implemented within 6 months by CMS and will be available to all oncologists nationwide.
- Could serve as a model for other areas of specific care relating to terminal illness for Medicare beneficiaries.

== See also ==
- National Quality Cancer Care Demonstration Project Act of 2009
