= Medicare (United States) =

US government health insurance program

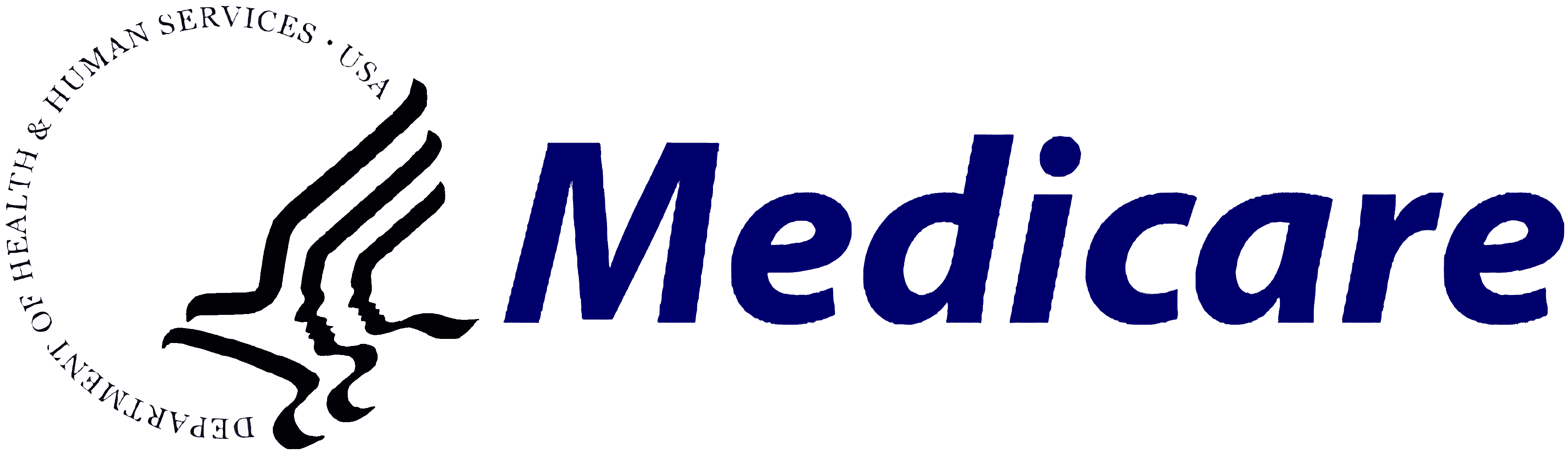

Agency overview
- Formed: July 30, 1965; 61 years ago
- Headquarters: 7500 Security Boulevard, Baltimore, Maryland 21244, U.S.
- Agency executive: Mehmet Oz, Administrator
- Parent department: Centers for Medicare and Medicaid Services
- Key document: Social Security Amendments of 1965
- Website: medicare.gov

Medicare plans include the government plan and the privately run Medicare Advantage plan. Medicare Advantage bundles certain features from the government plan.

Medicare is a federal health insurance program in the United States for people age 65 or older and younger people with disabilities, including those with end stage renal disease and amyotrophic lateral sclerosis (ALS or Lou Gehrig's disease). It started in 1965 under the Social Security Administration and is now administered by the Centers for Medicare and Medicaid Services (CMS).

Medicare is divided into four parts: A, B, C, and D. Part A covers hospital, skilled nursing, and hospice services. Part B covers outpatient services. Part C is an alternative that allows patients to choose private plans with different benefit structures that provide the same services as Parts A and B, usually with additional benefits. Part D is for self-administered prescription drugs.

In 2022, Medicare provided health insurance for 65.0 million individuals—more than 57 million people aged 65 and older and about 8 million younger people. According to annual Medicare Trustees reports and research by Congress' MedPAC group, Medicare covers about half of healthcare expenses of those enrolled. Enrollees cover most of the remaining costs by taking additional private insurance (medi-gap insurance), by enrolling in a Medicare Part D prescription drug plan, or by joining a private Medicare Part C (Medicare Advantage) plan. In 2022, spending by the Medicare Trustees topped $900 billion per the Trustees report Table II.B.1, of which $423 billion came from the U.S. Treasury and the rest primarily from the Part A Trust Fund (which is funded by payroll taxes) and premiums paid by beneficiaries. Households that retired in 2013 paid only 13 to 41 percent of the benefit dollars they are expected to receive.

Beneficiaries typically have other healthcare-related costs, including Medicare Part A, B, and D deductibles and Part B and C co-pays; the costs of long-term custodial care (which are not covered by Medicare); and the costs resulting from Medicare's lifetime and per-incident limits.

== History ==
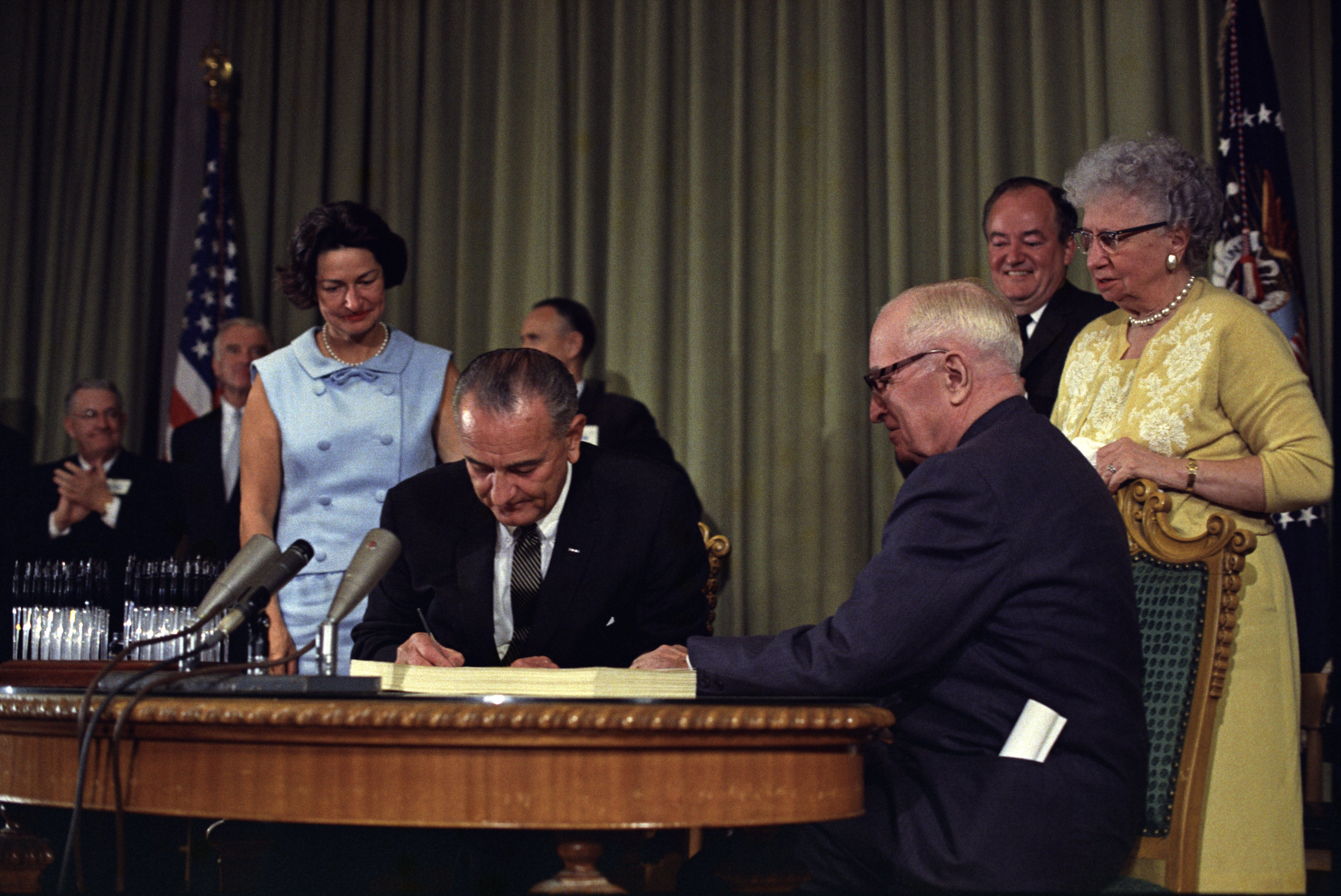
Lyndon B. Johnson signing the Medicare amendment (July 30, 1965). Former president Harry S. Truman (seated) and his wife, Bess, are on the far right.

Originally, the name "Medicare" in the United States referred to a program providing medical care for families of people serving in the military as part of the Dependents' Medical Care Act, which was passed in 1956. President Dwight D. Eisenhower held the first White House Conference on Aging in January 1961, in which creating a health care program for social security beneficiaries was proposed.

Various attempts were made in Congress to pass a bill providing for healthcare for the elderly, all without success. In 1963, however, a bill providing for both Medicare and an increase in Social Security benefits passed the Senate by 68–20 votes. As noted by one study, this was the first time that either chamber "had passed a bill embodying the principle of federal financial responsibility for health coverage, however limited it may have been." There was uncertainty over whether this bill would pass the House, however, as White House aide Henry Wilson's tally of House members’ votes on a conference bill that included Medicare “disclosed 180 “reasonably certain votes for Medicare, 29 “probable/possible,” 222 “against,” and 4 seats vacant.” Following the 1964 elections however, pro-Medicare forces obtained 44 votes in the House and 4 in the Senate. In July 1965, under the leadership of President Lyndon B. Johnson, Congress enacted Medicare under Title XVIII of the Social Security Act to provide health insurance to people age 65 and older, regardless of income or medical history. Johnson signed the Social Security Amendments of 1965 into law on July 30, 1965, at the Harry S. Truman Presidential Library in Independence, Missouri. Former president Harry S. Truman and his wife, former first lady Bess Truman, became the first recipients of the program.

Before Medicare was created, approximately 60% of people over the age of 65 had health insurance (as opposed to about 70% of the population younger than that), with coverage often unavailable or unaffordable to many others, because older adults paid more than three times as much for health insurance as younger people. Many of this group (about 20% of the total in 2022, 75% of whom were eligible for all Medicaid benefits) became "dual eligible" for both Medicare and Medicaid (which was created by the same 1965 law). In 1966, Medicare spurred the racial integration of thousands of waiting rooms, hospital floors, and physician practices by making payments to health care providers conditional on desegregation.

Medicare has undergone several major changes since 1965; provisions have expanded to include benefits for speech, physical, and chiropractic therapy in 1972. In the 1970s the option of payments to health maintenance organizations (HMOs) was added and in 1982, hospice benefits to aid elderly people on a temporary basis, which was made permanent in 1984.

In 1972, Congress expanded Medicare eligibility to younger people with permanent disabilities who receive Social Security Disability Insurance (SSDI) payments and to those with end-stage renal disease (ESRD). Congress further expanded Medicare in 2001 to cover younger people with amyotrophic lateral sclerosis (ALS, or Lou Gehrig's disease).

The association with HMOs that began in the 1970s was formalized and expanded under President Bill Clinton in 1997 as Medicare Part C (although not all Part C health plans sponsors have to be HMOs, about 75% are). In 2003, under President George W. Bush, a Medicare program for covering almost all self-administered prescription drugs was passed (and went into effect in 2006) as Medicare Part D.

== Administration ==
The Centers for Medicare and Medicaid Services (CMS), a component of the U.S. Department of Health and Human Services (HHS), administers Medicare, Medicaid, the Children's Health Insurance Program (CHIP), the Clinical Laboratory Improvement Amendments (CLIA), and parts of the Affordable Care Act (ACA) ("Obamacare"). Along with the U.S. Departments of Labor and Treasury, the CMS also implements the insurance reform provisions of the Health Insurance Portability and Accountability Act of 1996 (HIPAA) and most aspects of the Patient Protection and Affordable Care Act of 2010 as amended. The Social Security Administration is responsible for determining Medicare eligibility, eligibility for and payment of Extra Help/Low Income Subsidy payments related to Parts C and D of Medicare, and collecting most premium payments for the Medicare program.

The Chief Actuary of the CMS must provide accounting information and cost-projections to the Medicare Board of Trustees to assist them in assessing the program's financial health. The Trustees are required by law to issue annual reports on the financial status of the Medicare Trust Funds, and those reports are required to contain a statement of actuarial opinion by the Chief Actuary.

The Specialty Society Relative Value Scale Update Committee (or Relative Value Update Committee; RUC), composed of physicians associated with the American Medical Association, advises the government about pay standards for Medicare patient procedures performed by doctors and other professionals under Medicare Part B. A similar but different CMS process determines the rates paid for acute care and other hospitals—including skilled nursing facilities—under Medicare Part A. The rates paid for both Part A and Part B type services under Part C are whatever is agreed upon between the sponsor and the provider. The amounts paid for mostly self-administered drugs under Part D are whatever is agreed upon between the sponsor (almost always through a pharmacy benefit manager also used in commercial insurance) and pharmaceutical distributors and/or manufacturers.

== Financing ==
Medicare has several sources of financing.

Part A's inpatient admitted hospital and skilled nursing coverage is largely funded by revenue from a 2.9% payroll tax levied on employers and workers (each pays 1.45%). Until December 31, 1993, the law provided a maximum amount of compensation on which the Medicare tax could be imposed annually, in the same way that the Social Security payroll tax operates. Beginning on January 1, 1994, the compensation limit was removed. Self-employed individuals must calculate the entire 2.9% tax on self-employed net earnings (because they are both employee and employer), but they may deduct half of the tax from the income in calculating income tax. Beginning in 2013, the rate of Part A tax on earned income exceeding $200,000 for individuals ($250,000 for married couples filing jointly) rose to 3.8%, in order to pay part of the cost of the subsidies to people not on Medicare mandated by the Affordable Care Act.

In 2011, Medicare spending was over $900 billion, near 4% of U.S. gross domestic product according to the Trustees Figure 1.1 and over 15% of total US federal spending. Because of the two trust funds and their differing revenue sources (one dedicated and one not), the Trustees analyze Medicare spending as a percent of GDP rather than versus the Federal budget.

The aging of the Baby Boom generation into Medicare is projected by 2030 (when the last of the baby boom turns 65) to increase enrollment to more than 80 million. In addition, the fact that the number of payroll tax payors per enrollee will decline over time and that overall health care costs in the nation are rising pose substantial financial challenges to the program. Medicare spending is projected to increase from near 4% of GDP in 2022 to almost 6% in 2046. Baby-boomers are projected to have longer life spans, which will add to the future Medicare spending. In response to these financial challenges, Congress made substantial cuts to future payouts to providers (primarily acute care hospitals and skilled nursing facilities) as part of PPACA in 2010 and the Medicare Access and CHIP Reauthorization Act of 2015 (MACRA) and individual Congresspeople have offered many additional competing proposals to stabilize Medicare spending further. Many other factors have complicated the forecasting of Medicare Trust Fund health and spending trends including but not limited to the Covid pandemic, the overwhelming preference of people joining Medicare this century for Part C, and the increasing number of dual eligible (Medicaid and Medicare eligibility) beneficiaries.

In 2013 the Urban Institute published a report which analyzed the amounts that various households (single male, single female, married single-earner, married dual-earner, low income, average income, high income) contributed to the Medicare program over their lifetimes, and how much someone living to the statistically expected age would expect to receive in benefits. They found differing amounts for the different scenarios, but even the group with the "worst" return on their Medicare taxes would have concluded their working years with $158,000 in Medicare contributions and growth (assuming annual growth equal to inflation plus 2%) but would receive $385,000 in Medicare benefits (both numbers are in 2013 inflation adjusted dollars). Overall, the groups paid into the system 13 to 41 percent of what they were expected to receive.

Cost reduction is influenced by factors including reduction in inappropriate and unnecessary care by evaluating evidence-based practices as well as reducing the amount of unnecessary, duplicative, and inappropriate care. Cost reduction may also be effected by reducing medical errors, investment in healthcare information technology, improving transparency of cost and quality data, increasing administrative efficiency, and by developing both clinical/non-clinical guidelines and quality standards. Of course all of these factors relate to the entire United States health care delivery system and not just to Medicare.

== Eligibility ==
U.S. citizens or permanent residents who have lived in the U.S. for at least five continuous years and who qualify for Social Security payments or Railroad Retirement Board payment and over 65 years old are eligible. There are some instances where U.S. citizens might be able to enroll in Medicare earlier than age 65. For example, people with long term disabilities that prevent them from working (such as end-stage renal disease or amyotrophic lateral sclerosis) may be eligible at an earlier age. Individuals receiving Social Security Disability Insurance (SSDI) benefits for 24 months are automatically enrolled in Medicare Parts A and B in the 25th month. Individuals with permanent kidney failure requiring dialysis or a transplant may qualify for Medicare, regardless of age. Individuals diagnosed with ALS are automatically enrolled in Medicare Parts A and B the month their disability benefits begin. Those who are 65 and older who choose to enroll in Part A Medicare must pay a monthly premium to remain enrolled in Medicare Part A if they or their spouse have not paid the qualifying Medicare payroll taxes.

== Benefits and parts ==
Medicare cards

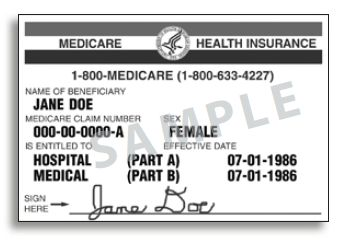
A sample of the Medicare card format used through 2018. The ID number is the subscriber's Social Security number, followed by a suffix indicating the holder's relationship to the subscriber (generally "A" for self).
There are separate lines for basic Part A and Part B's supplementary medical coverage, each with its own start date.

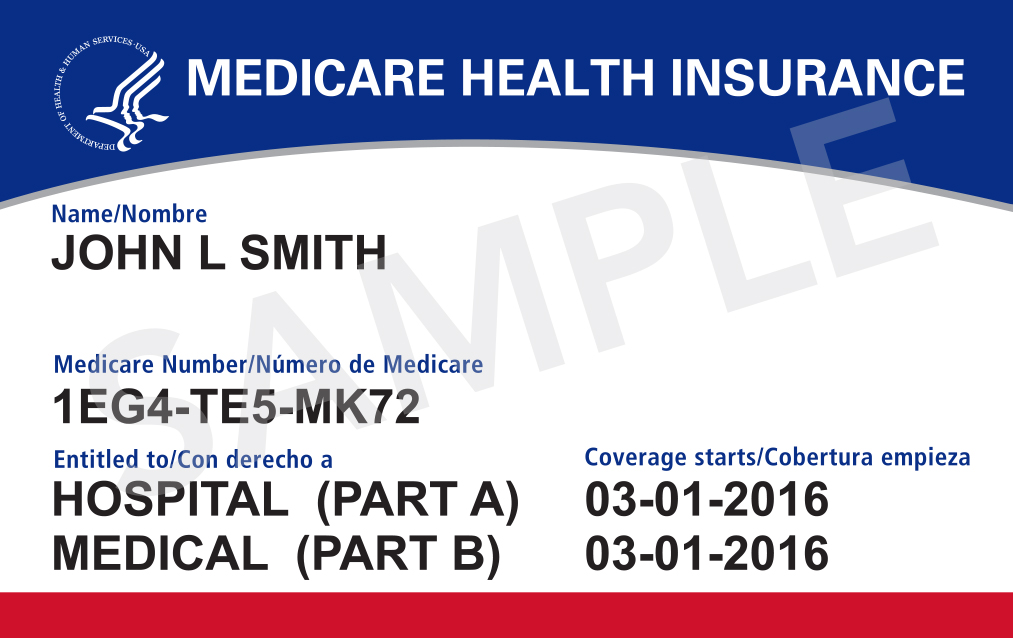
A sample of the new Medicare cards mailed out in 2018 and 2019 depending on state of residence on a Social Security database. The new ID number is randomly generated and not tied to any personally identifying information.
Beneficiaries on Medicare Part C health plans are issued with a separate card and ID number, in addition to their Original Medicare card.

Medicare has four parts: Part A, B, C, & D. Coverage under the first two (Parts A and B), as opposed to Part C plans, is referred to as Original Medicare.

In April 2018, CMS began mailing out new Medicare cards with new ID numbers to all beneficiaries. Previous cards had ID numbers containing beneficiaries' Social Security numbers; the new ID numbers are randomly generated and not tied to any other personally identifying information.

=== Part A: Hospital/hospice insurance ===
Part A covers inpatient hospital stays. The maximum length of stay that Medicare Part A covers in a hospital admitted inpatient stay or series of stays is typically 90 days. The first 60 days would be paid by Medicare in full, except one copay (also and more commonly referred to as a "deductible") at the beginning of the 60 days of $1736 as of 2026. Days 61–90 require a co-payment of $434 per day as of 2026. The beneficiary is also allocated "lifetime reserve days" that can be used after 90 days. These lifetime reserve days require a copayment of $868 per day as of 2026, and the beneficiary can use a total of only 60 of these days throughout their lifetime. A new pool of 90 hospital days, with new copays of $1736 in 2026 and $434 per day for days 61–90, starts only after the beneficiary has 60 days continuously with no payment from Medicare for hospital or Skilled Nursing Facility confinement.

Some "hospital services" are provided as inpatient services, which would be reimbursed under Part A; or as outpatient services, which would be reimbursed, not under Part A, but under Part B instead. The "Two-Midnight Rule" decides which is which. In August 2013, the Centers for Medicare and Medicaid Services announced a final rule concerning eligibility for hospital inpatient services effective October 1, 2013. Under the new rule, if a physician admits a Medicare beneficiary as an inpatient with an expectation that the patient will require hospital care that "crosses two midnights", Medicare Part A payment is "generally appropriate". However, if it is anticipated that the patient will require hospital care for less than two midnights, Medicare Part A payment is generally not appropriate; payment such as is approved will be paid under Part B. The time a patient spends in the hospital before an inpatient admission is formally ordered is considered outpatient time. But, hospitals and physicians can take into consideration the pre-inpatient admission time when determining if a patient's care will reasonably be expected to cross two midnights to be covered under Part A. In addition to deciding which trust fund is used to pay for these various outpatient versus inpatient charges, the number of days for which a person is formally considered an admitted patient affects eligibility for Part A skilled nursing services.

Medicare penalizes hospitals for readmissions. After making initial payments for hospital stays, Medicare will take back from the hospital these payments, plus a penalty of 4 to 18 times the initial payment, if an above-average number of patients from the hospital are readmitted within 30 days. These readmission penalties apply after some of the most common treatments: pneumonia, heart failure, heart attack, COPD, knee replacement, and hip replacement. A study of 18 states conducted by the Agency for Healthcare Research and Quality (AHRQ) found that 1.8 million Medicare patients aged 65 and older were readmitted within 30 days of an initial hospital stay in 2011; the conditions with the highest readmission rates were congestive heart failure, sepsis, pneumonia, and COPD and bronchiectasis.

The highest penalties on hospitals are charged after knee or hip replacements, $265,000 per excess readmission. The goals are to encourage better post-hospital care and more referrals to hospice and end-of-life care in lieu of treatment, while the effect is also to reduce coverage in hospitals that treat poor and frail patients. The total penalties for above-average readmissions in 2013 are $280 million, for 7,000 excess readmissions, or $40,000 for each readmission above the US average rate.

Part A fully covers brief stays for rehabilitation or convalescence in a skilled nursing facility and up to 100 days per medical necessity with a co-pay if certain criteria are met:

1. A preceding hospital stay must be at least three days as an inpatient, three midnights, not counting the discharge date.
2. The skilled nursing facility stay must be for something diagnosed during the hospital stay or for the main cause of hospital stay.
3. If the patient is not receiving rehabilitation but has some other ailment that requires skilled nursing supervision (e.g., wound management) then the nursing home stay would be covered.
4. The care being rendered by the nursing home must be skilled. Medicare part A does not pay for stays that only provide custodial, non-skilled, or long-term care activities, including activities of daily living (ADL) such as personal hygiene, cooking, cleaning, etc.
5. The care must be medically necessary and progress against some set plan must be made on some schedule determined by a doctor.

The first 20 days would be paid for in full by Medicare with the remaining 80 days requiring a co-payment of $204 per day as of 2024. Many insurance group retiree, Medigap and Part C insurance plans have a provision for additional coverage of skilled nursing care in the indemnity insurance policies they sell or health plans they sponsor. If a beneficiary uses some portion of their Part A benefit and then goes at least 60 days without receiving facility-based skilled services, the 90-day hospital clock and 100-day nursing home clock are reset and the person qualifies for new benefit periods.

Hospice benefits are also provided under Part A of Medicare for terminally ill persons with less than six months to live, as determined by the patient's physician. The terminally ill person must sign a statement that hospice care has been chosen over other Medicare-covered benefits, (e.g. assisted living or hospital care). Treatment provided includes pharmaceutical products for symptom control and pain relief as well as other services not otherwise covered by Medicare such as grief counseling. Hospice is covered 100% with no co-pay or deductible by Medicare Part A except that patients are responsible for a copay for outpatient drugs and respite care, if needed.

=== Part B: Medical insurance ===
The Monthly Premium for Part B for 2025 is $185.00 per month (for 2024 it was $174.70 per month).

Part B coverage begins once a patient meets his or her deductible ($257 for 2025), then typically Medicare covers 80% of the RUC-set rate for approved services, while the remaining 20% is the responsibility of the patient, either directly or indirectly by private group retiree or Medigap insurance. Part B coverage covers 100% for preventive services such as yearly mammogram screenings, osteoporosis screening, and many other preventive screenings.

Part B also helps with durable medical equipment (DME), including but not limited to canes, walkers, lift chairs, wheelchairs, and mobility scooters for those with mobility impairments. Prosthetic devices such as artificial limbs and breast prosthesis following mastectomy, as well as one pair of eyeglasses following cataract surgery, and oxygen for home use are also covered.

Medically necessary emergency ambulance transport is covered by Part B if transport by any other method is dangerous to health. Non-emergency ambulance transport, or transport when not suffering from a medical emergency, may be covered if a physician orders that ambulance transport is medically necessary. Transport by an air ambulance, either fixed-wing or helicopter, may also be covered if specialized services are required that are unable to be provided by ground services.

Anyone on Social Security (SS) in 2019 is "held harmless" from the 2019 amount if the increase in their SS monthly benefit does not cover the increase in their Part B premium from 2019 to 2020. This hold harmless provision is significant in years when SS does not increase but that is not the case for 2020. There are additional income-weighted surtaxes for those with incomes more than $85,000 per annum.

=== Part C: Medicare Advantage plans ===
Public Part C Medicare Advantage and other Part C health plans are required to offer coverage that meets or exceeds the standards set by Original Medicare but they do not have to cover every benefit in the same way (the plan must be actuarially equivalent to Original Medicare benefits). After approval by the Centers for Medicare and Medicaid Services, if a Part C plan chooses to cover less than Original Medicare for some benefits, such as Skilled Nursing Facility care, the savings may be passed along to consumers by offering even lower co-payments for doctor visits (or any other plus or minus aggregation approved by CMS).

Public Part C Medicare Advantage health plan members typically also pay a monthly premium in addition to the Medicare Part B premium to cover items not covered by Original Medicare (Parts A & B), such as the out-of-pocket (OOP) limit, self-administered prescription drugs, dental care, vision care, annual physicals, coverage outside the United States, and even gym or health club memberships as well as—and probably most importantly—reduce the 20% co-pays and high deductibles associated with Original Medicare. But in some situations the benefits are more limited (but they can never be more limited than Original Medicare and must always include an OOP limit) and there is no premium. The OOP limit can be as low as $1500 and as high as but no higher than $9350 (as with all insurance, the lower the limit, the higher the premium). In some cases, the sponsor even rebates part or all of the Part B premium, though these types of Part C plans are becoming rare.

=== Part D: Prescription drug plans ===
Medicare Part D went into effect on January 1, 2006. Anyone with Part A or B is eligible for Part D, which covers mostly self-administered drugs. It was made possible by the passage of the Medicare Modernization Act of 2003. To receive this benefit, a person with Medicare must enroll in a stand-alone Prescription Drug Plan (PDP) or public Part C health plan with integrated prescription drug coverage (MA-PD). These plans are approved and regulated by the Medicare program, but are actually designed and administered by various sponsors including charities, integrated health delivery systems, unions and health insurance companies; almost all these sponsors in turn use pharmacy benefit managers in the same way as they are used by sponsors of health insurance for those not on Medicare. Unlike Original Medicare (Part A and B), Part D coverage is not standardized (though it is highly regulated by the Centers for Medicare and Medicaid Services). Plans choose which drugs they wish to cover (but must cover at least two drugs in 148 different categories and cover all or "substantially all" drugs in the following protected classes of drugs: anti-cancer; anti-psychotic; anti-convulsant, anti-depressants, immuno-suppressant, and HIV and AIDS drugs). The plans can also specify, with CMS approval, at what level (or tier) they wish to cover it, and are encouraged to use step therapy. Some drugs are excluded from coverage altogether and Part D plans that cover excluded drugs are not allowed to pass those costs on to Medicare, and plans are required to repay CMS if they are found to have billed Medicare in these cases.

== Out-of-pocket costs ==
No part of Medicare pays for all of a beneficiary's covered medical costs and many costs and services are not covered at all. The program contains premiums, deductibles and coinsurance, which the covered individual must pay out-of-pocket. A study published by the Kaiser Family Foundation in 2008 found the Fee-for-Service Medicare benefit package was less generous than either the typical large employer preferred provider organization plan or the Federal Employees Health Benefits Program Standard Option. Some people may qualify to have other governmental programs (such as Medicaid) pay premiums and some or all of the costs associated with Medicare.

=== Premiums ===
==== Part A ====
Most Medicare enrollees do not pay a monthly Part A premium, because they (or a spouse) have had 40 or more 3-month quarters in which they paid Federal Insurance Contributions Act taxes. The benefit is the same no matter how much or how little the beneficiary paid as long as the minimum number of quarters is reached. Medicare-eligible persons who do not have 40 or more quarters of Medicare-covered employment may buy into Part A for an annual adjusted monthly premium of:

- $248.00 per month (as of 2012) for those with 30–39 quarters of Medicare-covered employment, or
- $451.00 per month (as of 2012) for those with fewer than 30 quarters of Medicare-covered employment and who are not otherwise eligible for premium-free Part A coverage.

==== Part B ====
Most Medicare Part B enrollees pay an insurance premium for this coverage; the standard Part B premium for 2026 is $202.90 a month. A new income-based premium surtax schema has been in effect since 2007, wherein Part B premiums are higher for beneficiaries with incomes exceeding $85,000 for individuals or $170,000 for married couples. Depending on the extent to which beneficiary earnings exceed the base income, these higher Part B premiums are from 30% to 70% higher with the highest premium paid by individuals earning more than $214,000, or married couples earning more than $428,000. This extra amount is called the Income Related Monthly Adjustment Amount (IRMAA). The IRMAA surcharge changes for individuals annually and fluctuates along with changes in an individual’s income. The IRMAA calculation has a lag time of two years.

=== Deductible and coinsurance ===
Part A—For each benefit period, a beneficiary pays an annually adjusted:

- A Part A deductible of $1,736 in 2026 for a hospital stay of 1–60 days.
- A $434 per day co-pay in 2026 for days 61–90 of a hospital stay.
- A $868 per day co-pay in 2026 for days 91–150 of a hospital stay, as part of their limited Lifetime Reserve Days.
- All costs for each day beyond 150 days
- Coinsurance for a Skilled Nursing Facility is $217 per day in 2026 for days 21-100 for each benefit period (no co-pay for the first 20 days).
- A blood deductible of the first 3 pints of blood needed in a calendar year, unless replaced. There is a 3-pint blood deductible for both Part A and Part B, and these separate deductibles do not overlap.

Part B—After beneficiaries meet the yearly deductible of $240 for 2024, they will be required to pay a co-insurance of 20% of the Medicare-approved amount for all services covered by Part B with the exception of most lab services, which are covered at 100%. Previously, outpatient mental health services was covered at 50%, but under the Medicare Improvements for Patients and Providers Act of 2008, it gradually decreased over several years and now matches the 20% required for other services. They are also required to pay an excess charge of 15% for services rendered by physicians who do not accept assignment.

The deductibles, co-pays, and coinsurance charges for Part C and D plans vary from plan to plan. All Part C plans include an annual out-of-pocket (OOP) upper spend limit. Original Medicare does not include an OOP limit.

=== Medicare supplement (Medigap) policies ===
All insurance companies that sell Medigap policies are required to make Plan A available, and if they offer any other policies, they must also make either Plan C available as well. Plan F is no longer offered as of 2020, but anyone who has a Plan F may keep it. Many of the insurance companies that offer Medigap insurance policies also sponsor Part C health plans, but most Part C health plans are sponsored by integrated health delivery systems and their spin-offs, charities, and unions as opposed to insurance companies.

== Payment for services ==
Medicare contracts with regional insurance companies to process over one billion fee-for-service claims per year. In 2008, Medicare accounted for 13% ($386 billion) of the federal budget. In 2016 it was projected to account for close to 15% ($683 billion) of the total expenditures. For the decade 2010–2019 Medicare was projected to cost 6.4 trillion dollars.

=== Reimbursement for Part A services ===
For institutional care, such as hospital and nursing home care, Medicare uses prospective payment systems. In a prospective payment system, the health care institution receives a set amount of money for each episode of care provided to a patient, regardless of the actual amount of care. The actual allotment of funds is based on a list of diagnosis-related groups (DRG). The actual amount depends on the primary diagnosis that is actually made at the hospital. There are some issues surrounding Medicare's use of DRGs because if the patient uses less care, the hospital gets to keep the remainder. This, in theory, should balance the costs for the hospital. However, if the patient uses more care, then the hospital has to cover its own losses. This results in the issue of "upcoding", when a physician makes a more severe diagnosis to hedge against accidental costs.

=== Reimbursement for Part B services ===
Payment for physician services under Medicare has evolved since the program was created in 1965. Initially, Medicare compensated physicians based on the physician's charges, and allowed physicians to bill Medicare beneficiaries the amount in excess of Medicare's reimbursement. In 1975, annual increases in physician fees were limited by the Medicare Economic Index (MEI). The MEI was designed to measure changes in costs of physician's time and operating expenses, adjusted for changes in physician productivity. From 1984 to 1991, the yearly change in fees was determined by legislation. This was done because physician fees were rising faster than projected.

The Omnibus Budget Reconciliation Act of 1989 made several changes to physician payments under Medicare. Firstly, it introduced the Medicare Fee Schedule, which took effect in 1992. Secondly, it limited the amount Medicare non-providers could balance bill Medicare beneficiaries. Thirdly, it introduced the Medicare Volume Performance Standards (MVPS) as a way to control costs.

On January 1, 1992, Medicare introduced the Medicare Fee Schedule (MFS), a list of about 7,000 services that can be billed for. Each service is priced within the Resource-Based Relative Value Scale (RBRVS) with three Relative Value Units (RVUs) values largely determining the price. The three RVUs for a procedure are each geographically weighted and the weighted RVU value is multiplied by a global Conversion Factor (CF), yielding a price in dollars. The RVUs themselves are largely decided by a private group of 29 (mostly specialist) physicians—the American Medical Association's Specialty Society Relative Value Scale Update Committee (RUC).

From 1992 to 1997, adjustments to physician payments were adjusted using the MEI and the MVPS, which essentially tried to compensate for the increasing volume of services provided by physicians by decreasing their reimbursement per service.

In 1998, Congress replaced the VPS with the Sustainable Growth Rate (SGR). This was done because of highly variable payment rates under the MVPS. The SGR attempts to control spending by setting yearly and cumulative spending targets. If actual spending for a given year exceeds the spending target for that year, reimbursement rates are adjusted downward by decreasing the Conversion Factor (CF) for RBRVS RVUs.

In 2002, payment rates were cut by 4.8%. In 2003, payment rates were scheduled to be reduced by 4.4%. However, Congress boosted the cumulative SGR target in the Consolidated Appropriation Resolution of 2003 (P.L. 108–7), allowing payments for physician services to rise 1.6%. In 2004 and 2005, payment rates were again scheduled to be reduced. The Medicare Modernization Act (P.L. 108–173) increased payments by 1.5% for those two years.

In 2006, the SGR mechanism was scheduled to decrease physician payments by 4.4%. (This number results from a 7% decrease in physician payments times a 2.8% inflation adjustment increase.) Congress overrode this decrease in the Deficit Reduction Act (P.L. 109–362), and held physician payments in 2006 at their 2005 levels. Similarly, another congressional act held 2007 payments at their 2006 levels, and HR 6331 held 2008 physician payments to their 2007 levels, and provided for a 1.1% increase in physician payments in 2009. Without further continuing congressional intervention, the SGR is expected to decrease physician payments from 25% to 35% over the next several years.

MFS has been criticized for not paying doctors enough because of the low conversion factor. By adjustments to the MFS conversion factor, it is possible to make global adjustments in payments to all doctors.

The SGR was the subject of possible reform legislation again in 2014. On March 14, 2014, the United States House of Representatives passed the SGR Repeal and Medicare Provider Payment Modernization Act of 2014 (H.R. 4015; 113th Congress), a bill that would have replaced the (SGR) formula with new systems for establishing those payment rates. However, the bill would pay for these changes by delaying the Affordable Care Act's individual mandate requirement, a proposal that was very unpopular with Democrats. The SGR was expected to cause Medicare reimbursement cuts of 24 percent on April 1, 2014, if a solution to reform or delay the SGR was not found. This led to another bill, the Protecting Access to Medicare Act of 2014 (H.R. 4302; 113th Congress), which would delay those cuts until March 2015. This bill was also controversial. The American Medical Association and other medical groups opposed it, asking Congress to provide a permanent solution instead of just another delay.

The SGR process was replaced by new rules as of the passage of MACRA in 2015.

==== Provider participation ====
There are two ways for providers to be reimbursed in Medicare. "Participating" providers accept "assignment", which means that they accept Medicare's approved rate for their services as payment (typically 80% from Medicare and 20% from the beneficiary). Some non-participating doctors do not take assignment, but they also treat Medicare enrollees and are authorized to balance bills no more than a small fixed amount above Medicare's approved rate. A minority of doctors are "private contractors" from a Medicare perspective, which means they opt out of Medicare and refuse to accept Medicare payments altogether. These doctors are required to inform patients that they will be liable for the full cost of their services out-of-pocket, often in advance of treatment.

While the majority of providers accept Medicare assignments, (97 percent for some specialties), and most physicians still accept at least some new Medicare patients, that number is in decline. While 80% of physicians in the Texas Medical Association accepted new Medicare patients in 2000, only 60% were doing so by 2012. A study published in 2012 concluded that the Centers for Medicare and Medicaid Services (CMS) relies on the recommendations of an American Medical Association advisory panel. The study led by Miriam J. Laugesen, of Columbia Mailman School of Public Health, and colleagues at UCLA and the University of Illinois, shows that for services provided between 1994 and 2010, CMS agreed with 87.4% of the recommendations of the committee, known as RUC or the Relative Value Update Committee.

==== Office medication reimbursement ====
Chemotherapy and other medications dispensed in a physician's office are reimbursed according to the Average Sales Price (ASP), a number computed by taking the total dollar sales of a drug as the numerator and the number of units sold nationwide as the denominator. The current reimbursement formula is known as "ASP+6" since it reimburses physicians at 106% of the ASP of drugs. Pharmaceutical company discounts and rebates are included in the calculation of ASP, and tend to reduce it. In addition, Medicare pays 80% of ASP+6, which is the equivalent of 84.8% of the actual average cost of the drug. Some patients have supplemental insurance or can afford the co-pay. Large numbers do not. This leaves the payment to physicians for most of the drugs in an "underwater" state. ASP+6 superseded Average Wholesale Price in 2005, after a 2003 front-page New York Times article drew attention to the inaccuracies of Average Wholesale Price calculations.

This procedure is scheduled to change dramatically in 2017 under a CMS proposal that will likely be finalized in October 2016.

==== Medicare 10 percent incentive payments ====
"Physicians in geographic Health Professional Shortage Areas (HPSAs) and Physician Scarcity Areas (PSAs) can receive incentive payments from Medicare. Payments are made on a quarterly basis, rather than claim-by-claim, and are handled by each area's Medicare carrier."

== Enrollment ==
Generally, if an individual already receives Social Security payments, at age 65 the individual becomes automatically enrolled in Medicare Part A (hospital insurance) and Medicare Part B (medical insurance). If the individual chooses not to enroll in Part B (typically because the individual is still working and receiving employer insurance), then the individual must proactively opt out of it when receiving the automatic enrollment package. Delay in enrollment in Part B carries no penalty if the individual has other insurance (e.g., the employment situation noted above), but may be penalized under other circumstances. An individual who does not receive Social Security benefits upon turning 65 must sign up for Medicare if they want it. Penalties may apply if the individual chooses not to enroll at age 65 and does not have other insurance.

The 2025 Health Insurance Open Enrollment (October 15 to December 7), which is taking place as the entire medical insurance market is facing financial pressure, features wholesale changes in Medicare Advantage coverage.

=== Parts A & B ===
==== Part A Late Enrollment Penalty ====
If an individual is not eligible for premium-free Part A, and they do not buy a premium-based Part A when they are first eligible, the monthly premium may go up 10%. The individual must pay the higher premium for twice the number of years that they could have had Part A, but did not sign up. For example, if they were eligible for Part A for two years but did not sign up, they must pay the higher premium for four years. Usually, individuals do not have to pay a penalty if they meet certain conditions that allow them to sign up for Part A during a Special Enrollment Period, such as taking up residency in another state or otherwise moving outside of one's former coverage area.

==== Part B Late Enrollment Penalty ====
If an individual does not sign up for Part B when they are first eligible, they may have to pay a late enrollment penalty for as long as they have Medicare. Their monthly premium for Part B may go up 10% for each full 12-month period that they could have had Part B, but did not sign up for it. Usually, they do not pay a late enrollment penalty if they meet certain conditions that allow them to sign up for Part B during a special enrollment period.

== Adjudication and appeals ==
Initial determinations on Medicare matters are made by different bodies depending on the issue. The Social Security Administration (SSA) determines entitlement to Medicare and adjudicates many Part A and Part B enrollment, late-enrollment penalty, and income-related monthly adjustment amount (IRMAA) disputes at the initial and reconsideration levels. Medicare administrative contractors (MACs) process fee-for-service Part A and Part B claims, apply PPS groupers and payment rules, issue initial claim determinations, conduct first-level appeals (redeterminations), and audit and settle institutional provider cost reports, issuing a notice of program reimbursement (NPR) as the final cost-report determination. Medicare Advantage (Part C) plans and Part D prescription drug plans make their own initial coverage determinations and conduct first-level appeals internally. Beneficiaries facing imminent termination of inpatient hospital, skilled nursing, home health, or hospice services may request expedited review from a beneficiary and family centered care quality improvement organization (BFCC-QIO). In addition to 1-800-MEDICARE, Senior Medicare Patrol volunteers help beneficiaries detect, prevent, and report Medicare fraud, errors, and abuse.

For individual claim disputes, the standard appeals track applies. After the first level, fee-for-service appeals proceed to reconsideration by a qualified independent contractor (QIC), while Part C and Part D appeals proceed to reconsideration by an independent review entity (IRE). Subsequent levels are shared: a hearing before an administrative law judge (ALJ) at the Office of Medicare Hearings and Appeals (OMHA); review by the Medicare Appeals Council; and judicial review in US district court if the amount in controversy meets the statutory threshold. SSA-track entitlement, enrollment, and IRMAA appeals join this same upper appellate ladder at the OMHA level, bypassing SSA's own ALJ corps.

Provider cost-report and reimbursement disputes — including graduate medical education and indirect medical education payments, DSH calculations, wage index application, outlier methodology, Medicare bad debts, organ acquisition costs, and provider-based status determinations — follow a separate track. After receiving an NPR (or comparable final contractor determination) and meeting statutory requirements, providers may appeal to the Provider Reimbursement Review Board (PRRB), an independent adjudicatory body within HHS that hears provider appeals involving cost reports and related reimbursement issues, including legal and methodological challenges. CMS may file amicus curiae briefs in PRRB cases, and the CMS administrator may elect to review a PRRB decision, with the authority to affirm, reverse, or modify it; if the administrator declines review, the PRRB decision becomes final agency action. PRRB and administrator decisions are subject to judicial review in federal district court.

== Comparison with private insurance ==
Because eligibility for Medicare benefits is set by federal law, Medicare can only cut costs by reducing payment rates or revising its interpretation of medical necessity. By statute, Medicare may only pay for items and services that are "reasonable and necessary for the diagnosis or treatment of illness or injury or to improve the functioning of a malformed body member", unless there is another statutory authorization for payment. The program has achieved substantial reductions for prices it pays for health care and administrative expenses. Medicare uses its market power to pay less for the same health care services than private health insurances. A 2020 KFF study found price discrimination, where private insurances are on average billed around 99% more for hospital services and 43% more for physician services. Private insurers' costs have grown almost 60% more than Medicare's since 1970.

Medicare's coverage policies and payment rates are publicly known, and all enrollees are entitled to the same coverage. In the private insurance market, plans can be tailored to offer different benefits and coverage to different customers. Insurers have fewer disclosure requirements than Medicare, and studies show that customers in the private sector can find it difficult to know what their policy covers, and at what cost.

Because Medicare pays for a huge share of health care in every region of the country, it has market power to set delivery and payment policies. For example, Medicare promoted the adaptation of prospective payments based on DRGs, which prevents unscrupulous providers from setting their own exorbitant prices. Meanwhile, the Patient Protection and Affordable Care Act (Obamacare) has given Medicare the mandate to promote cost-containment throughout the health care system, for example, by promoting the creation of accountable care organizations or by replacing fee-for-service payments with bundled payments.

== Costs and funding challenges ==
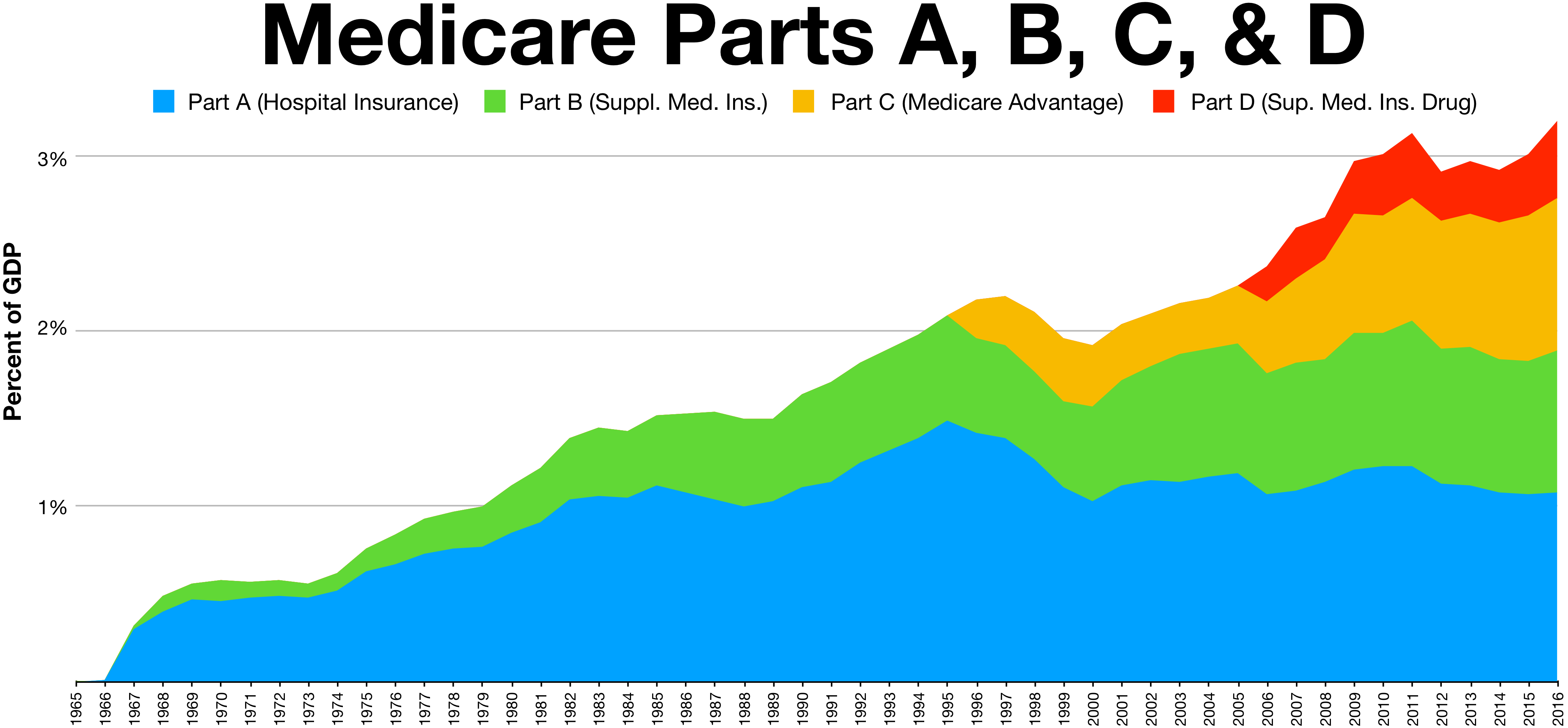
Medicare spending as a percent of GDP

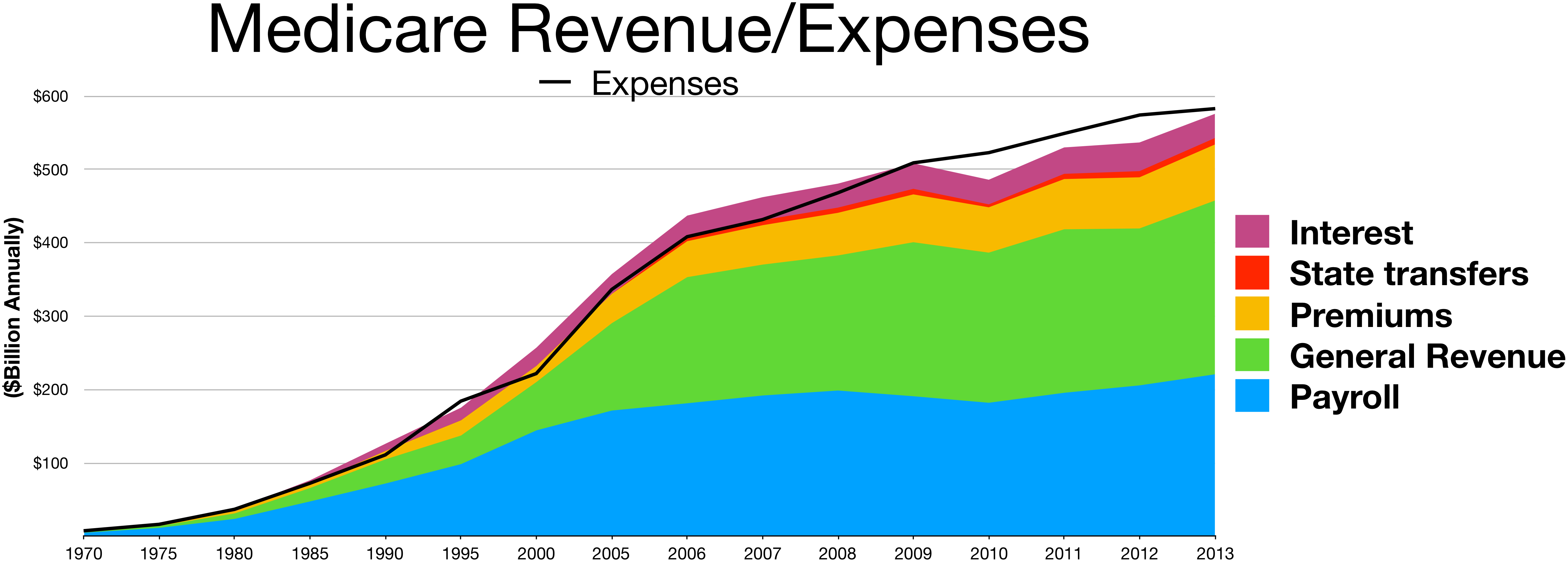
Medicare expenses and revenue

Over the long-term, Medicare faces significant financial challenges because of rising overall health care costs, increasing enrollment as the population ages, and a decreasing ratio of workers to enrollees. Total Medicare spending was projected to increase from $523 billion in 2010 to around $900 billion by 2020. From 2010 to 2030, Medicare enrollment is projected to increase, from 47 million to 79 million, and the ratio of workers to enrollees is expected to decrease from 3.7 to 2.4. However, the ratio of workers to retirees has declined steadily for decades, and social insurance systems have remained sustainable due to rising worker productivity. There is some evidence that productivity gains will continue to offset demographic trends in the near future.

In 2026, the Congressional Budget Office (CBO) projected that net Medicare outlays would increase by $75 billion, or 8 percent, reaching $1.1 trillion. This amount would represent approximately 60 percent of federal spending on major healthcare programs. The CBO expects Medicare spending to rise due to more enrollees and higher costs per person. Spending per person may increase by 5 percent yearly from 2027 to 2036, with Part A enrollment growing from 71.5 million to 80.5 million. MedPAC also highlighted service volume and drug price increases as key factors. Medicare spending is increasing, impacting federal revenues. In 2024, it accounted for 16% of income tax revenues, expected to rise to 20% by 2028, affecting funding for other priorities.

The Congressional Budget Office (CBO) wrote in 2008 that "future growth in spending per beneficiary for Medicare and Medicaid—the federal government's major health care programs—will be the most important determinant of long-term trends in federal spending. Changing those programs in ways that reduce the growth of costs—which will be difficult, in part because of the complexity of health policy choices—is ultimately the nation's central long-term challenge in setting federal fiscal policy."

Overall health care costs were projected in 2011 to increase by 5.8 percent annually from 2010 to 2020, in part because of increased use of medical services, higher prices for services, and new technologies. Medicare's cost growth is now the same as GDP growth. Health care costs are rising faster than inflation across the board, but the cost of insurance has risen dramatically for families and employers as well as the federal government. Since 1970, the per-capita cost of private insurance coverage has grown roughly one percentage point faster each year than the per-capita cost of Medicare. Since the late 1990s, Medicare has performed especially well relative to private insurers. Over the next decade, Medicare's per capita spending is projected to grow at a rate of 2.5 percent each year, compared to private insurance's 4.8 percent. Nonetheless, most experts and policymakers agree containing health care costs is essential to the nation's fiscal outlook. Much of the debate over the future of Medicare revolves around whether per capita costs should be reduced by limiting payments to providers or by shifting more costs to Medicare enrollees.

=== Indicators ===
Several measures serve as indicators of the long-term financial status of Medicare. These include total Medicare spending as a share of gross domestic product (GDP), the solvency of the Medicare HI trust fund, Medicare per-capita spending growth relative to inflation and per-capita GDP growth; general fund revenue as a share of total Medicare spending; and actuarial estimates of unfunded liability over the 75-year timeframe and the infinite horizon (netting expected premium/tax revenue against expected costs). The major issue with these indicators is comparing future projections against current law vs. what actuaries expect to happen. For example, current law specifies that Part A payments to hospitals and skilled nursing facilities will be cut substantially after 2028 and that doctors will get no raises after 2025. Actuaries expect that the law will change to keep these events from happening.

=== Total Medicare spending as a share of GDP ===
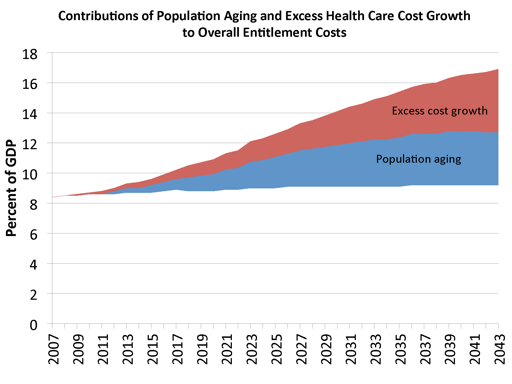
Medicare and Medicaid Spending as % GDP (2013)

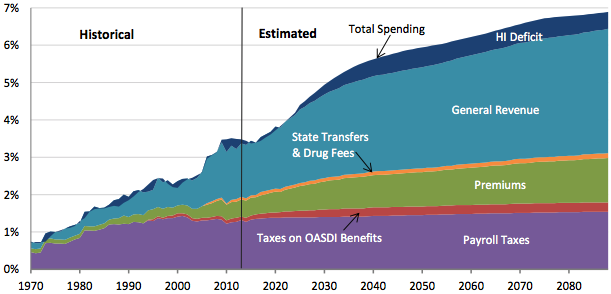
Medicare cost and non-interest income by source as a percentage of GDP

This measure, which examines Medicare spending in the context of the US economy as a whole, is projected to increase from 3.7 percent in 2017 to 6.2 percent by 2092 under current law and over 9 percent under what actuaries really expect will happen (called an "illustrative example" in recent-year Trustees Reports).

=== The solvency of the Medicare HI trust fund ===
This measure involves only Medicare Part A. The trust fund is considered insolvent when available revenue plus any existing balances will not cover 100 percent of annual projected costs. According to the 2018 estimate by the Medicare trustees, the trust fund was expected to become insolvent in 8 years (2026), at which time available revenue will cover around 85 percent of annual projected costs for Part A services. Since Medicare began, this solvency projection has ranged from two to 28 years, with an average of 11.3 years. This and other projections in Medicare Trustees reports are based on what its actuaries call the intermediate scenario but the reports also include worst-case and best-case projections that are quite different (other scenarios presume Congress will change present law).

=== Medicare per-capita spending growth relative to inflation and per-capita GDP growth ===
Per capita spending relative to inflation per-capita GDP growth was to be an important factor used by the PPACA-specified Independent Payment Advisory Board (IPAB), as a measure to determine whether it must recommend to Congress proposals to reduce Medicare costs. However, the IPAB never formed and was formally repealed by the Balanced Budget Act of 2018.

=== General fund revenue as a share of total Medicare spending ===
This measure, established under the Medicare Modernization Act (MMA), examines Medicare spending in the context of the federal budget. Each year, MMA requires the Medicare trustees to make a determination about whether general fund revenue is projected to exceed 45 percent of total program spending within a seven-year period. If the Medicare trustees make this determination in two consecutive years, a "funding warning" is issued. In response, the president must submit cost-saving legislation to Congress, which must consider this legislation on an expedited basis. This threshold was reached and a warning issued every year between 2006 and 2013 but it has not been reached since that time and was not expected to be reached in the 2016–2022 "window". This is a reflection of the reduced spending growth mandated by the ACA according to the Trustees.

=== Unfunded obligation ===
Medicare's unfunded obligation is the total amount of money that would have to be set aside today such that the principal and interest would cover the gap between projected revenues (mostly Part B premiums and Part A payroll taxes to be paid over the timeframe under current law) and spending over a given timeframe. By law the timeframe used is 75 years though the Medicare actuaries also give an infinite-horizon estimate because life expectancy consistently increases and other economic factors underlying the estimates change.

As of January 1, 2016, Medicare's unfunded obligation over the 75-year time frame is $3.8 trillion for the Part A Trust Fund and $28.6 trillion for Part B. Over an infinite timeframe, the combined unfunded liability for both programs combined is over $50 trillion, with the difference primarily in the Part B estimate. These estimates assume that CMS will pay full benefits as currently specified over those periods though that would be contrary to current United States law. In addition, as discussed throughout each annual Trustees' report, "the Medicare projections shown could be substantially understated as a result of other potentially unsustainable elements of current law." For example, current law effectively provides no raises for doctors after 2025; that is unlikely to happen. It is impossible for actuaries to estimate unfunded liability other than assuming current law is followed (except relative to benefits as noted), the Trustees state "that actual long-range present values for (Part A) expenditures and (Part B/D) expenditures and revenues could exceed the amounts estimated by a substantial margin."

=== Public opinion ===
Popular opinion surveys show that the public views Medicare's problems as serious, but not as urgent as other concerns. In January 2006, the Pew Research Center found 62 percent of the public said addressing Medicare's financial problems should be a high priority for the government, but that still put it behind other priorities. Surveys suggest that there is no public consensus behind any specific strategy to keep the program solvent.

=== Fraud and waste ===
The Government Accountability Office lists Medicare as a "high-risk" government program in need of reform, in part because of its vulnerability to fraud and partly because of its long-term financial problems. Fewer than 5% of Medicare claims are audited.

== Criticism ==
Robert M. Ball, a former commissioner of Social Security under President Kennedy in 1961 and later under Johnson and Nixon, defined the major obstacle to financing health insurance for the elderly: the high cost of care for the aged combined with the generally low incomes of retired people. Because retired older people use much more medical care than younger employed people, an insurance premium related to the risk for older people needed to be high, but if the high premium had to be paid after retirement, when incomes are low, it was an almost impossible burden for the average person. The only feasible approach, he said, was to finance health insurance in the same way as cash benefits for retirement, by contributions paid while at work, when the payments are least burdensome, with the protection furnished in retirement without further payment. In the early 1960s relatively few of the elderly had health insurance, and what they had was usually inadequate. Insurers such as Blue Cross, which had originally applied the principle of community rating, faced competition from other commercial insurers that did not community rate, and so were forced to raise their rates for the elderly.

Medicare is not generally an unearned entitlement. Entitlement is most commonly based on a record of contributions to the Medicare fund. As such it is a form of social insurance making it feasible for people to pay for insurance for sickness in old age when they are young and able to work and be assured of getting back benefits when they are older and no longer working. Some people will pay in more than they receive back and others will receive more benefits than they paid in. Unlike private insurance where some amount must be paid to attain coverage, all eligible persons can receive coverage regardless of how much or if they had ever paid in.

=== Politicized payment ===
Bruce Vladeck, director of the Health Care Financing Administration in the Clinton administration, has argued that lobbyists have changed the Medicare program "from one that provides a legal entitlement to beneficiaries to one that provides a de facto political entitlement to providers."

=== Quality of beneficiary services ===
A 2001 study by the Government Accountability Office evaluated the quality of responses given by Medicare administrative contractor (MAC) and unified program integrity contractor (UPIC) customer service representatives to provider (physician) questions. The evaluators assembled a list of questions, which they asked during a random sampling of calls to MACs. The rate of complete, accurate information provided by Medicare customer service representatives was 15%. Since then, steps have been taken to improve the quality of customer service given by MACs, specifically the 1-800-MEDICARE contractor. As a result, 1-800-MEDICARE customer service representatives (CSR) have seen an increase in training, quality assurance monitoring has significantly increased, and a customer satisfaction survey is offered to random callers.

=== Hospital accreditation ===
In most states the Joint Commission, a private, non-profit organization for accrediting hospitals, decides whether or not a hospital is able to participate in Medicare, as currently there are no competitor organizations recognized by CMS.

Other organizations can also accredit hospitals for Medicare. These include the Community Health Accreditation Program, the Accreditation Commission for Health Care, the Compliance Team and the Healthcare Quality Association on Accreditation.

Accreditation is voluntary and an organization may choose to be evaluated by their State Survey Agency or by CMS directly.

=== Graduate medical education ===
Regarding graduate medical education, Medicare funds the vast majority of residency training in the US. This tax-based financing covers resident salaries and benefits through payments called Direct Medical Education payments. Medicare also uses taxes for Indirect Medical Education, a subsidy paid to teaching hospitals in exchange for training resident physicians. For the 2008 fiscal year these payments were $2.7 billion and $5.7 billion, respectively. Overall funding levels have remained at the same level since 1996, so that the same number or fewer residents have been trained under this program. Meanwhile, the US population continues to grow both older and larger, which has led to greater demand for physicians, in part due to higher rates of illness and disease among the elderly compared to younger individuals. At the same time, the cost of medical services continues rising rapidly, and many geographic areas face physician shortages, both trends suggesting the supply of physicians remains too low.

Medicare thus finds itself in the odd position of having assumed control of the single largest funding source for graduate medical education, currently facing major budget constraints, and as a result, freezing funding for graduate medical education, as well as for physician reimbursement rates. This has forced hospitals to look for alternative sources of funding for residency slots. This halt in funding, in turn, exacerbates the exact problem Medicare sought to solve in the first place: improving the availability of medical care. However, some healthcare administration experts believe that the shortage of physicians may be an opportunity for providers to reorganize their delivery systems to become less costly and more efficient. Physician assistants and Advanced Registered Nurse Practitioners may begin assuming more responsibilities that traditionally fell to doctors, but do not necessarily require the advanced training and skill of a physician.

== Legislation and reform ==
- 1960: PL 86-778 Social Security Amendments of 1960 (Kerr-Mills aid)
- 1965: PL 89-97 Social Security Act of 1965, Establishing Medicare Benefits
- 1980: Medicare Secondary Payer Act of 1980, prescription drugs coverage added
- 1988: PL 100-360 Medicare Catastrophic Coverage Act of 1988
- 1989: Medicare Catastrophic Coverage Repeal Act of 1989
- 1997: PL 105-33 Balanced Budget Act of 1997
- 2003: PL 108-173 Medicare Prescription Drug, Improvement, and Modernization Act
- 2010: Patient Protection and Affordable Care Act and Health Care and Education Reconciliation Act of 2010
- 2013: Sequestration effects on Medicare due to Budget Control Act of 2011
- 2015: Extensive changes to Medicare, primarily to the SGR provisions of the Balanced Budget Act of 1997 as part of the Medicare Access and CHIP Reauthorization Act (MACRA)
- 2016: Changes to the Social Security "hold harmless" laws as they affect Part B premiums based on the Bipartisan Budget Act of 2015
- 2022: Inflation Reduction Act included Medicare negotiation provisions, allowing negotiation of prescription drug prices beginning in 2026

In 1977, the Health Care Financing Administration (HCFA) was established as a federal agency responsible for the administration of Medicare and Medicaid. This would be renamed to Centers for Medicare & Medicaid Services (CMS) in 2001. By 1983, the diagnosis-related group (DRG) replaced pay for service reimbursements to hospitals for Medicare patients.

President Bill Clinton attempted an overhaul of Medicare through his health care reform plan in 1993–1994 but was unable to get the legislation passed by Congress.

In 2003, Congress passed the Medicare Prescription Drug, Improvement, and Modernization Act, which President George W. Bush signed into law on December 8, 2003. Part of this legislation included filling gaps in prescription-drug coverage left by the Medicare Secondary Payer Act that was enacted in 1980. The 2003 bill strengthened the Workers' Compensation Medicare Set-Aside Program (WCMSA) that is monitored and administered by CMS.

On August 1, 2007, the US House of Representatives voted to reduce payments to Medicare Advantage providers in order to pay for expanded coverage of children's health under the SCHIP program. As of 2008, Medicare Advantage plans cost, on average, 13 percent more per person insured for like beneficiaries than direct payment plans. Many health economists have concluded that payments to Medicare Advantage providers have been excessive. The Senate, after heavy lobbying from the insurance industry, declined to agree to the cuts in Medicare Advantage proposed by the House. President Bush subsequently vetoed the SCHIP extension.

=== Effects of the Patient Protection and Affordable Care Act ===
The Affordable Care Act (ACA) of 2010 made a number of changes to the Medicare program. Several provisions of the law were designed to reduce the cost of Medicare. The most substantial provisions slowed the growth rate of payments to hospitals and skilled nursing facilities under Part A of Medicare, through a variety of methods (e.g., percentage cuts, penalties for readmissions).

Congress also attempted to reduce payments to public Part C Medicare health plans by aligning the rules that establish Part C plans' capitated fees more closely with the FFS paid for comparable care to "similar beneficiaries" under Parts A and B of Medicare. Primarily these reductions involved much discretion on the part of CMS. Examples of what CMS did, included effectively ending a Part C program Congress had previously initiated to increase the use of Part C in rural areas (the so-called Part C PFFS plan) and reducing over time a program that encouraged employers and unions to create their own Part C plans not available to the general Medicare beneficiary base (so-called Part C EGWP plans) by providing higher reimbursement. These two types of Part C plans had been identified by MedPAC as the programs that most negatively affected parity between the cost of Medicare beneficiaries on Parts A/B/C and the costs of beneficiaries not on Parts A/B/C. These efforts to reach parity have been more than successful. As of 2015, all beneficiaries on A/B/C cost 4% less per person than all beneficiaries not on A/B/C. But whether that is because the cost of the former decreased or the cost of the latter increased is not known.

PPACA also slightly reduced annual increases in payments to physicians and to hospitals that serve a disproportionate share of low-income patients. Along with other minor adjustments, these changes reduced Medicare's projected cost over the next decade by $455 billion.

Additionally, the PPACA created the Independent Payment Advisory Board (IPAB), which was empowered to submit legislative proposals to reduce the cost of Medicare if the program's per-capita spending grows faster than per-capita GDP plus one percent. The IPAB was never formed and was formally repealed by the Balanced Budget Act of 2018.

The PPACA also made some changes to Medicare enrollees' benefits. By 2020, it "closed" the so-called "donut hole" between Part D plans' initial spend phase coverage limits and the catastrophic cap on out-of-pocket spending, reducing a Part D enrollees' exposure to the cost of prescription drugs by an average of $2,000 a year. That is, the template co-pay in the gap (which legally still exists) will be the same as the template co-pay in the initial spend phase, 25%. This lowered costs for about 5% of the people on Medicare. Limits were also placed on out-of-pocket costs for in-network care for public Part C health plan enrollees. Most of these plans had such a limit but ACA formalized the annual out of pocket spend limit. Beneficiaries on traditional Medicare do not get such a limit but can effectively arrange for one through private insurance.

Meanwhile, Medicare Part B and D premiums were restructured in ways that reduced costs for most people while raising contributions from the wealthiest people with Medicare. The law also expanded coverage of or eliminated co-pays for some preventive services.

The PPACA instituted a number of measures to control Medicare fraud and abuse, such as longer oversight periods, provider screenings, stronger standards for certain providers, the creation of databases to share data between federal and state agencies, and stiffer penalties for violators. The law also created mechanisms, such as the Center for Medicare and Medicaid Innovation to fund experiments to identify new payment and delivery models that could conceivably be expanded to reduce the cost of health care while improving quality.

=== Proposals for reforming Medicare ===
As legislators continue to seek new ways to control the cost of Medicare, a number of new proposals to reform Medicare have been introduced in recent years.

==== Premium support ====
Since the mid-1990s, there have been a number of proposals to change Medicare from a publicly run social insurance program with a defined benefit, for which there is no limit to the government's expenses, into a publicly run health plan program that offers "premium support" for enrollees. The basic concept behind the proposals is that the government would make a defined contribution, that is a premium support, to the health plan of a Medicare enrollee's choice. Sponsors would compete to provide Medicare benefits and this competition would set the level of fixed contribution. Additionally, enrollees would be able to purchase greater coverage by paying more in addition to the fixed government contribution. Conversely, enrollees could choose lower cost coverage and keep the difference between their coverage costs and the fixed government contribution. The goal of premium Medicare plans is for greater cost-effectiveness; if such a proposal worked as planned, the financial incentive would be greatest for Medicare plans that offer the best care at the lowest cost.

This concept is basically how public Medicare Part C already works (but with a much more complicated competitive bidding process that drives up costs for the Trustees, but is advantageous to the beneficiaries). Given that only about 1% of people on Medicare got premium support when Aaron and Reischauer first wrote their proposal in 1995 and the percentage is now 35%, on the way to 50% by 2040 according to the Trustees, perhaps no further reform is needed.

There have been a number of criticisms of the premium support model. Some have raised concern about risk selection, where insurers find ways to avoid covering people expected to have high health care costs. Premium support proposals, such as the 2011 plan proposed by Senator Ron Wyden and Rep. Paul Ryan (R–Wis.), have aimed to avoid risk selection by including protection language mandating that plans participating in such coverage must provide insurance to all beneficiaries and are not able to avoid covering higher risk beneficiaries. Some critics are concerned that the Medicare population, which has particularly high rates of cognitive impairment and dementia, would have a hard time choosing between competing health plans. Robert Moffit, a senior fellow of The Heritage Foundation responded to this concern, stating that while there may be research indicating that individuals have difficulty making the correct choice of health care plan, there is no evidence to show that government officials can make better choices. Henry Aaron, one of the original proponents of premium supports, has since argued that the idea should not be implemented, given that Medicare Advantage plans have not successfully contained costs more effectively than traditional Medicare and because the political climate is hostile to the kinds of regulations that would be needed to make the idea workable.

Currently, public Part C Medicare health plans avoid this issue with an indexed risk formula that provides lower per capita payments to sponsors for relatively (remember all these people are over 65 years old) healthy plan members and higher per capita payments for less healthy members.

==== Changing the age of eligibility ====
A number of different plans have been introduced that would raise the age of Medicare eligibility. Some have argued that, as the population ages and the ratio of workers to retirees increases, programs for the elderly need to be reduced. Since the age at which Americans can retire with full Social Security benefits has risen from 65 to 67, it is argued that the age of eligibility for Medicare should rise with it (though people can begin receiving reduced Social Security benefits as early as age 62).

The CBO projected that raising the age of Medicare eligibility would save $113 billion over 10 years after accounting for the necessary expansion of Medicaid and state health insurance exchange subsidies under health care reform, which are needed to help those who could not afford insurance purchase it. The Kaiser Family Foundation found that raising the age of eligibility would save the federal government $5.7 billion a year, while raising costs for other payers. According to Kaiser, raising the age would cost $3.7 billion to 65- and 66-year-olds, $2.8 billion to other consumers whose premiums would rise as insurance pools absorbed more risk, $4.5 billion to employers offering insurance, and $0.7 billion to states expanding their Medicaid rolls. Ultimately Kaiser found that the plan would raise total social costs by more than twice the savings to the federal government.

During the 2020 presidential campaign, Joe Biden proposed lowering the age of Medicare eligibility to 60 years old. A Kaiser Family Foundation study found that lowering the age to 60 could reduce costs for employer health plans by up to 15% if all eligible employees shifted to Medicare.

==== Negotiating the prices of prescription drugs ====
Currently, people with Medicare can get prescription drug coverage through a public Medicare Part C plan or through the standalone Part D prescription drug plans (PDPs) program. Each plan sponsor establishes its own coverage policies and could, if desired, independently negotiate the prices it pays to drug manufacturers. But because each plan has a much smaller coverage pool than the entire Medicare program, many argue that this system of paying for prescription drugs undermines the government's bargaining power and artificially raises the cost of drug coverage. Conversely, negotiating for the sponsors is almost always done by one of three or four companies typically tied to pharmacy retailers each of whom alone has much more buying power than the entire Medicare program. That pharmacy-centric versus government-centric approach appears to have worked given that Part D has cost 50% or more under original projected spending and has held average annual drug spending by seniors in absolute dollars fairly constant for over 10 years.

Many look to the Veterans Health Administration (VHA) as a model of lower cost prescription drug coverage. Since the VHA provides healthcare directly, it maintains its own formulary and negotiates prices with manufacturers. Studies show that the VHA pays substantially less for drugs than the PDP plans Medicare Part D subsidizes. One analysis found that adopting a formulary similar to the VHA's would save Medicare $14 billion a year.

There are other proposals for savings on prescription drugs that do not require such fundamental changes to Medicare Part D's payment and coverage policies. Manufacturers who supply drugs to Medicaid are required to offer a 15 percent rebate on the average manufacturer's price. Low-income elderly individuals who qualify for both Medicare and Medicaid receive drug coverage through Medicare Part D, and no reimbursement is paid for the drugs the government purchases for them. Reinstating that rebate would yield savings of $112 billion, according to a recent CBO estimate. Some have questioned the ability of the federal government to achieve greater savings than the largest PDPs, since some of the larger plans have coverage pools comparable to Medicare's, though the evidence from the VHA is promising. Some also worry that controlling the prices of prescription drugs would reduce incentives for manufacturers to invest in research and development, though the same could be said of anything that would reduce costs. However, the comparisons with the VHA point out that the VHA covers about half the drugs as Part D.

==== Reforming care for the "dual-eligibles" ====
Roughly nine million Americans—mostly older adults with low incomes—are eligible for both Medicare and Medicaid. These individuals tend to have particularly poor health—more than half are being treated for five or more chronic conditions—and high costs. Average annual per-capita spending for "dual-eligibles" is $20,000, compared to $10,900 for the Medicare population as a whole.

The dual-eligible population comprises roughly 20 percent of Medicare's enrollees but accounts for 36 percent of its costs. There is substantial evidence that these individuals receive highly inefficient care because responsibility for their care is split between the Medicare and Medicaid programs—most see a number of different providers without any kind of mechanism to coordinate their care, and they face high rates of potentially preventable hospitalizations. Because Medicaid and Medicare cover different aspects of health care, both have a financial incentive to shunt patients into care the other program pays for.

Many experts have suggested that establishing mechanisms to coordinate care for the dual-eligibles could yield substantial savings in the Medicare program, mostly by reducing hospitalizations. Such programs would connect patients with primary care, create an individualized health plan, assist enrollees in receiving social and human services as well as medical care, reconcile medications prescribed by different doctors to ensure they do not undermine one another, and oversee behavior to improve health. The general ethos of these proposals is to "treat the patient, not the condition," and maintain health while avoiding costly treatments.

There is some controversy over who exactly should take responsibility for coordinating the care of the dual-eligibles. There have been some proposals to transfer dual-eligibles into existing Medicaid managed care plans, which are controlled by individual states. But many states facing severe budget shortfalls might have some incentive to stint on necessary care or otherwise shift costs to enrollees and their families to capture some Medicaid savings. Medicare has more experience managing the care of older adults, and is already expanding coordinated care programs under the ACA, though there are some questions about private Medicare plans' capacity to manage care and achieve meaningful cost savings.

Estimated savings from more effective coordinated care for the dual eligibles range from $125 billion to over $200 billion, mostly by eliminating unnecessary, expensive hospital admissions.

==== Income-relating Medicare premiums ====
Both House Republicans and President Obama proposed increasing the additional premiums paid by the wealthiest people with Medicare, compounding several reforms in the ACA that would increase the number of wealthier individuals paying higher, income-related Part B and Part D premiums. Such proposals were projected to save $20 billion over the course of a decade, and would ultimately result in more than a quarter of Medicare enrollees paying between 35 and 90 percent of their Part B costs by 2035, rather than the typical 25 percent. If the brackets mandated for 2035 were implemented today, it would mean that anyone earning more than $47,000 (as an individual) or $94,000 (as a couple) would be affected. Under the Republican proposals, affected individuals would pay 40 percent of the total Part B and Part D premiums, which would be equivalent of $2,500.

More limited income-relation of premiums only raises limited revenue. Currently, 5 percent of Medicare enrollees pay an income-related premium, and most pay 35 percent of their total costs (on average), compared to the 25 percent most people pay. Only a negligible number of enrollees fall into the higher income brackets required to bear a more substantial share of their costs—roughly half a percent of individuals and less than three percent of married couples currently pay more than 35 percent of their total Part B costs.

There is some concern that tying premiums to income would weaken Medicare politically over the long run, since people tend to be more supportive of universal social programs than of means-tested ones.

==== Medigap restrictions ====
Some Medicare supplemental insurance (or "Medigap") plans cover all of an enrollee's cost-sharing, insulating them from any out-of-pocket costs and guaranteeing financial security to individuals with significant health care needs. Many policymakers believe that such plans raise the cost of Medicare by creating a perverse incentive that leads patients to seek unnecessary, costly treatments. Many argue that unnecessary treatments are a major cause of rising costs and propose that people with Medicare should feel more of the cost of their care to create incentives to seek the most efficient alternatives. Various restrictions and surcharges on Medigap coverage have appeared in some deficit reduction proposals. One of the furthest-reaching reforms proposed, which would prevent Medigap from covering any of the first $500 of coinsurance charges and limit it to covering 50 percent of all costs beyond that, could save $50 billion over 10 years. But it would also increase health care costs substantially for people with costly health care needs.

There is some evidence that claims of Medigap's tendency to cause over-treatment may be exaggerated and that potential savings from restricting it might be smaller than expected. Meanwhile, there are some concerns about the potential effects on enrollees. Individuals who face high charges with every episode of care have been shown to delay or forgo needed care, jeopardizing their health and possibly increasing their health care costs over time. Given their lack of medical training, most patients tend to have difficulty distinguishing between necessary and unnecessary treatments. The problem could be exaggerated among the Medicare population, which has low levels of health literacy.

==== Vision Coverage ====
The Build Back Better legislation was passed in Congress in November 2021, and adds hearing services subject to Medicare Part B deductible and 20% coinsurance beginning in 2023. The initial proposal of this bill also aimed to address gaps in Medicare such as dental and vision coverage, however both services were removed following objections in the Senate. A study performed by Urban Institute showed that Medicare enrollees spend more on routine vision services ($8.4 billion) than routine hearing services ($5.7 billion), of which $5.4 billion and $4.7 billion were spent out of pocket respectively. In addition, nearly 1 in 3 Medicare beneficiaries used vision services annually, and averages a spending of $411 per person; as such, the impact of expanding Medicare to include vision services would benefit many people. There is an income gradient seen in those who use vision services and a severe unmet needs for these services in those with lower incomes. Enrollees below the federal poverty level spent $190, whereas those 400% above the level spent $465; and a likely trend that far fewer non-Hispanic Black and Hispanic beneficiaries use and spend on vision services—which is in keeping with the trend seen with hearing aids.

==== Medicare for All ====
The Medicare for All Act would dramatically expand the Medicare program to cover all US residents with automatic enrollment upon birth or residency providing coverage for items and services that are medically necessary to maintain health or to diagnose, treat, or rehabilitate a health condition, including hospital services, prescription drugs, mental health and substance abuse treatment, dental and vision services, home- and community-based long-term care, gender affirming care, and reproductive care, including contraception and abortions. The bill was first introduced in the US House of Representatives by Representative John Conyers in 2003. The act was most recently introduced in the US Senate by Senator Bernie Sanders on May 17, 2023.

== Legislative oversight ==
The following congressional committees provide oversight for Medicare programs:

Senate

- Senate Committee on Appropriations
  - Subcommittee on Labor, Health and Human Services, Education, and Related Agencies
- Senate Budget Committee
- Senate Committee on Finance
- Senate Committee on Homeland Security and Governmental Affairs
  - Subcommittee on Oversight of Government Management, the Federal Workforce, and the District of Columbia
- Senate Committee on Health, Education, Labor and Pensions
  - Subcommittee on Federal Financial Management, Government Information, and International Security
  - Subcommittee on Primary Health and Aging
- Senate Special Committee on Aging

House

- House Committee on Appropriations
  - Subcommittee on Labor, Health and Human Services, Education, and Related Agencies
- House Budget Committee
- House Committee on Energy and Commerce
  - Subcommittee on Health
  - Subcommittee on Oversight and Investigations
- House Small Business Committee
- House Committee on Ways and Means
  - Subcommittee on Health

Joint

- Joint Economic Committee

== See also ==
- Administration on Aging
- Federal Insurance Contributions Act
- Health care in the United States
- Health care politics
- Health care reform in the United States
- Health insurance in the United States
- Maurice Mazel
- Medicaid
- Medicare (Australia)
- Medicare (Canada)
- Medicare Access and CHIP Reauthorization Act of 2015
- Medicare for All Act
- Medicare Physician Group Practice Demonstration
- Medicare Prompt Pay Correction Act
- Medicare Quality Cancer Care Demonstration Act
- Medicare Rights Center
- National Health Service (United Kingdom)
- National Quality Cancer Care Demonstration Project Act of 2009
- Patient Protection and Affordable Care Act (Obamacare)
- Philosophy of healthcare
- Single-payer health care
- Social policy
- Stark Law
- Wagner-Murray-Dingell Bill
