= Medicare administrative contractor =

Medicare administrative contractors (MACs) are private organizations that contract with the US Centers for Medicare & Medicaid Services (CMS) to administer the fee-for-service Medicare program within designated geographic or functional jurisdictions. MACs process and pay claims under Medicare Part A and Part B or for durable medical equipment, prosthetics, orthotics, and supplies (DMEPOS).

- Process and pay claims.
- Enroll providers and suppliers.
- Conduct medical review.
- Decide redeterminations at the first level of Medicare appeals.
- Provide customer service and provider education.
- Issue local coverage determinations.

MACs work with multiple functional contractors. In addition to the pre- and postpayment reviews conducted by the MACs, CMS employs limited prior authorization, targeted preclaim and prepayment reviews, and postpayment audits to reduce improper payments.

== History ==
Established by the Medicare Prescription Drug, Improvement, and Modernization Act of 2003, MACs replaced the fiscal intermediaries and carriers that had administered Medicare claims since 1965.
