= Medicare Physician Group Practice Demonstration =

United States health care policy

The Medicare Physician Group Practice (PGP) demonstration was a United States government policy that implemented a physician pay-for-performance (P4P) initiative for Medicare. The demonstration established incentives for quality improvement and cost efficiency. Ten large physician groups participated in the demonstration, which started on April 1, 2005, and ran for 5 years. Previous funding arrangements, like the volume performance standard (VPS) and the sustainable growth rate (SGR) did not provide incentives to slow the growth of services. The Medicare PGP demonstration was intended to overcome that limitation in previous funding arrangements.

== Introduction ==
Section 412 of the Medicare, Medicaid, and SCHIP Benefits Improvement and Protection Act of 2000 established the Medicare Physician Group Practice (PGP) Demonstration, a project designed to create incentives for physicians to improve both the cost efficiency and quality of the care they provide to Medicare beneficiaries. The Demonstration is a prime example of the shared savings model of payment reform and represents Medicare's first physician Pay-for-Performance initiative. The three main goals of the PGP Demonstration are:

- To encourage physician participation in Parts A and B of the Medicare Program;
- To promote cost efficiency and quality of care; and
- To reward physicians for improved health outcomes.

The demonstration spanned five years, beginning on April 1, 2005, and ending on March 31, 2010.

== Demonstration design ==
=== Selection criteria ===
Participants in the PGP Demonstration were selected based on a wide variety of criteria, including but not limited to organizational structure, operational feasibility, geographic location, and proposed implementation strategy, with preference given to multispecialty groups with highly developed clinical and management information systems. Participating organizations were required to include 200 or more physicians.

=== Participating physician groups ===
10 large multispecialty groups representing approximately 5,000 physicians and 220,000 Medicare fee-for-service beneficiaries participated in the Demonstration. The participating groups included:

- Billings Clinic, Billings, Montana
- Dartmouth-Hitchcock Clinic, Bedford, New Hampshire
- The Everett Clinic, Everett, Washington
- Forsyth Medical Group, Winston-Salem, North Carolina
- Geisinger Health System, Danville, Pennsylvania
- Marshfield Clinic, Marshfield, Wisconsin
- Middlesex Health System, Middletown, Connecticut
- Park Nicollet Health Services, St. Louis Park, Minnesota
- St. John's Health System, Springfield, Missouri
- University of Michigan Faculty Group Practice, Ann Arbor, Michigan

| Participant | Organizational Structure | Part of Integrated Delivery System? | Includes Academic Medical Center? | Service Area |
|---|---|---|---|---|
| Dartmouth-Hitchcock Clinic | Faculty/Community Group Practice | Yes | Yes | New Hampshire/Eastern Vermont |
| Billings Clinic | Group Practice | Yes | No | South-Central Montana/Northwestern Wyoming |
| Geisinger Clinic | Group Practice | Yes | No | Central-Northeast Pennsylvania |
| Middlesex Health System | Network Model | Yes | No | South-Central Connecticut |
| Marshfield Clinic | Group Practice | No | No | North-Central Wisconsin |
| Forsyth Medical Group | Group Practice | Yes | No | Northwest North Carolina |
| Park Nicollet Clinic | Group Practice | Yes | No | South-Central Minnesota |
| St. John's Clinic | Group Practice | Yes | No | South-Central Missouri/Northwest Arkansas |
| Everett Clinic | Group Practice | No | No | West-Central Washington |
| University of Michigan Faculty Group Practice | Faculty Practice | Yes | Yes | Southeastern Michigan |

Source: Kautter, J., Pope, G.C., Trisollini, M., RTI International, and Grund, S., Iowa Foundation for Medical Care.

=== Beneficiary assignment ===
For each performance year of the demonstration Medicare beneficiaries were retrospectively assigned to each PGP group if the majority of the patient's office or other outpatient services were provided by the PGP group.

=== Spending growth rate ===
An assigned beneficiary growth rate was calculated at the end of each performance year by comparing the total Medicare Part A and Part B per capita expenditures to a base year period. PGPs that were able to attain a spending growth rate of more than 2% lower than their comparison populations were eligible for shared savings. Each PGP's local market area served as the basis for comparison populations.

=== Risk adjustment ===
Medicare Part A and Part B expenditures were risk adjusted according to the CMS-HCC concurrent risk adjustment model. The Centers for Medicare and Medicaid Services (CMS) HCC (Risk Adjustment and Hierarchical Condition Category) is a payment model mandated in 1997 by CMS to estimate future costs for patients. The CMS-HCC concurrent risk adjustment model uses current year diagnoses to adjust current year expenditures to account for changes in case-mix or the health status of assigned beneficiaries in a PGP group.

=== Regular payment mechanism ===
Under the PGP Demonstration physicians continued to be paid for Part A and Part B services provided to Medicare beneficiaries according to regular Medicare fee-for-service fee schedules.

=== Performance payments ===
Performance payments were separated into two metrics: cost efficiency and quality.

- Cost efficiency: PGPs were eligible for performance payments up to 80% of savings generated for Medicare after exceeding the 2% minimum savings threshold. The Medicare Trust Fund retained a minimum of 20% of the savings.
- Quality Measures: PGPs were eligible to receive incentive payments for satisfactorily reporting data on quality measures under the Physician Quality Reporting Initiative (PQRI) administered by the Centers for Medicare and Medicaid Services (CMS).

=== Quality measures ===
The quality measures used in the Demonstration were developed by CMS in collaboration with the American Medical Association's Physician Consortium for Performance Improvement and the National Committee for Quality Assurance (NCQA), and were reviewed by the National Quality Forum. Quality measures were phased in such that Year 1 included only measures related to diabetes mellitus, Year 2 added measures related to congestive heart failure and coronary artery disease, and Year 3 added preventive care measures related to hypertension and cancer screening.

| Diabetes Mellitus | Congestive Heart Failure | Coronary Artery Disease | Preventive Care |
|---|---|---|---|
| HbA1c Management | Left Ventricular Function Assessment | Antiplatelet Therapy | Blood Pressure Screening |
| HbA1c Control | Left Ventricular Ejection Fraction Testing | Drug Therapy for Lowering LDL Cholesterol | Blood Pressure Control |
| Blood Pressure Management | Weight Measurement | Beta-Blocker Therapy – Prior MI | Blood Pressure Control Plan of Care |
| Lipid Measurement | Blood Pressure Screening | Blood Pressure | Breast Cancer Screening |
| LDL Cholesterol Level | Patient Education | Lipid Profile | Colorectal Cancer Screening |
| Urine Protein Testing | Beta-Blocker Therapy | LDL Cholesterol Level | |
| Eye Exam | Ace Inhibitor Therapy | Ace Inhibitor Therapy | |
| Foot Exam | Warfarin Therapy for Patients HF | | |
| Influenza Vaccination | Influenza Vaccination | | |
| Pneumonia Vaccination | Pneumonia Vaccination | | |

Source: Medicare Physician Group Practice Demonstration: Physicians Groups Continue to Improve Quality and Generate Savings Under Medicare Physician Pay-for-Performance Demonstration, Centers for Medicare & Medicaid Services, Department of Health & Human Services, July 2011.

== Performance results ==
| | Year 1 | Year 2 | Year 3 | Year 4 | Year 5 |
|---|---|---|---|---|---|
| Quality Measures | All 10 PGPs improve clinical management of diabetes by attaining specified goals on at least 7 out of 10 diabetes clinical quality measures. Forsyth Medical Group and St. John's Health System achieve benchmark performance on all 10 measures. | All 10 PGPs improve quality of care for chronically ill patients by attaining specified goals on at least 25 out of 27 quality measures for patients with diabetes, coronary artery disease, and congestive heart failure. Forsyth Medical Group, Geisinger Clinic, Marshfield Clinic, St. John's Health System, and the University of Michigan Faculty Group Practice achieve benchmark performance on all 27 measures. | All 10 PGPs improve quality of care for patients with chronic illness or who require preventive care by attaining specified goals on at least 28 out of 32 quality measures for patients with diabetes, coronary artery disease, congestive heart failure, hypertension, and cancer screening. Geisinger Clinic and Park Nicollet Health Services achieve benchmark performance on all 32 measures. | All 10 PGPs achieve benchmark performance on at least 29 of the 32 measures. Geisinger Clinic, Marshfield Clinic, and Park Nicollet Health Services achieve benchmark performance on all 32 measures. All 10 PGPs achieve benchmark performance on the 10 heart failure and 7 coronary artery disease measures. | All 10 PGPs achieve benchmark performance on at least 30 of the 32 measures. Billings Clinic, Everett Clinic, Forsyth Medical Group, Geisinger Health System, Middlesex Health System, Park Nicollet Health Services, and St. John's Health System achieve benchmark performance on all 32 measures. All 10 PGPs achieve benchmark performance on the 10 heart failure, 7 coronary artery disease, and 2 preventive care measures. |
| Cost Efficiency | 2 PGPs (Marshfield Clinic and the University of Michigan Faculty Group Practice) qualify for shared savings payments | 4 PGPs (Dartmouth-Hitchcock Clinic, Everett Clinic, Marshfield Clinic, and the University of Michigan Faculty Group Practice) qualify for shared savings payments | 5 PGPs (Dartmouth-Hitchcock Clinic, Geisinger Clinic, Marshfield Clinic, St. John's Health System, and the University of Michigan Faculty Group Practice) qualify for shared savings payments | 5 PGPs (Dartmouth-Hitchcock Clinic, Geisinger Clinic, Marshfield Clinic, St. John's Health System, and the University of Michigan Faculty Group Practice) qualify for shared savings payments | 4 PGPs (Marshfield Clinic, Park Nicolette Health Services, St. John's Health System, and the University of Michigan Faculty Group Practice) qualify for shared savings payments |
| Performance Payments | $7.3 million in performance payments of $9.5 million total in Medicare savings | $13.8 million in performance payments of $17.4 million total in Medicare savings | $25.3 million in performance payments of $32.3 million total in Medicare savings | $31.7 million in performance payments of $38.7 million total in Medicare savings | $29.4 million in performance payments of $36.2 million total in Medicare savings |

== Lessons ==
=== Return on investment ===
In the first year of participation, PGPs invested $1.7 million on average. Some additional funding was provided by CMS to offset the high start-up costs faced by PGPs. Research indicates that the time frame in which PGPs can expect a reasonable return on initial investment is five years or more.

=== Successes ===
Those PGPs that were able to attain shared savings payments attributed their success to a variety of factors including but not limited to organizational structure, care process redesign, investment in care management programs, improved diagnostic coding, and market conditions.

Of the PGPs that were able to attain shared savings, Marshfield Clinic earned approximately half of these payments. Michigan, Dartmouth, and St. John's each earned approximately 15%, while Geisinger attained approximately 5%.

Theodore Praxel of Marshfield Clinic attributes the PGP's success to "an aggressive acceleration of multiple initiatives… including health information technology (point of care reminders, being completely chartless), care management programs, and education and feedback to providers regarding populations of patients with a given condition."

The four PGPs that qualified for performance payments in Year 2 were all either independent provider groups (Everett and Marshfield) or had close ties with an academic medical center (Dartmouth-Hitchcock and University of Michigan).

According to David Abelson, CEO of Park Nicollet Health Services, "[these] results provide compelling evidence that paying for outcomes, rather than volume, helps our patients, helps make health care more affordable and saves money for taxpayers."

=== Challenges ===
Several design issues were identified as being potential barriers to attaining higher cost efficiency and performance on quality measures. These identified barriers include comparator group construction, patient assignment and attribution, the risk adjustment mechanism employed, and the lack of timely data provided by CMS to participating PGPs regarding attribution. In addition, because the PGP demonstration relied on the fee-for-service model, PGPs had little control over where attributed patients chose to seek care. This proved problematic because under the demonstration the PGP was responsible for all costs of care that the patient incurred regardless of care setting, making it difficult to control costs.

Across all PGP demonstration sites the majority of savings achieved were in outpatient, rather than inpatient, services. RTI International, the research institute charged with evaluating the demonstration, hypothesized that the inclusion of a hospital in a PGP may be a "potential deterrent to achieving savings… [as] these systems may be unable to reduce avoidable admissions or use lower cost care substitutes without affecting their inpatient revenue." Similarly, none of the 5 PGPs that are part of integrated healthcare delivery systems (but not affiliated with an academic medical center), along with Middlesex Health System (a physician network sponsored by a hospital affiliate) were able to attain shared savings in Year 5.

== Aftermath ==
All 10 of the provider groups that participated in the original PGP Demonstration are currently participating in the demonstration's successor program, the PGP Transition Demonstration (PGP TD). This 2-year demonstration has been modified from the original demonstration in several ways:

- A national benchmark will replace the local comparator group when assessing a PGP's spending growth rate;
- A prospective risk adjustment mechanism will replace the concurrent risk adjustment mechanism;
- Medicare beneficiaries will be assigned to a PGP based on use of primary care physician services rather than use of services provided by physicians of any specialty; and
- New quality measures have been added.

PGPs have the option of transitioning to Accountable Care Organizations (ACOs) under the Medicare Shared Savings Program.
