= Maazel =

Maazel is a surname. Notable people with the surname include:

- Fiona Maazel (born 1975), American writer, daughter of Lorin Maazel
- Lorin Maazel (1930–2014), American conductor, violinist and composer
- Lincoln Maazel (1903–2009), American actor, father of Lorin

== See also ==
- Mazel, a surname
