= National Quality Cancer Care Demonstration Project Act of 2009 =

US law

The National Quality Cancer Care Demonstration Project Act of 2009 (H.R. 3675 IH) is an initiative intended to enhance the quality of cancer care in the United States, focused on seniors covered by Medicare (approximately 45% of cancer patients are Medicare beneficiaries), while also controlling costs. House bill H.R. 3675 was introduced by Congressman Artur Davis (D-AL) and cosponsored by Representatives Mary Jo Kilroy (D-OH), Steve Israel (D-NY), Joe Courtney (D-CT) and Adam Schiff (D-CA).

The Quality Cancer Care Demonstration (QCCD) project was developed by community oncologists, with input from policy experts, to be a national Medicare demonstration project focused on ensuring the delivery of quality, cost-efficient medical care to patients with cancer, by reinforcing and expanding the use of evidence-based guidelines and the provision of demonstrated quality delivery of care through adjustments in the payment system.

According to the Institute of Medicine, the quality of cancer care must be measured by using a core set of quality measures. Cancer care quality measures should be used to hold providers, including health care systems, health plans, and physicians, accountable for demonstrating that they provide and improve quality of care.

H.R. 3675 calls for national reporting, via the Medicare payment system, of key metrics of evidence based care, refinement of those metrics, and development of a new Medicare performance-based reimbursement system that is patient-centric and quality driven, while aligning better with parameters of cost control.

== Elements ==
The bill includes the following elements:

- Establishment by the Secretary of Health and Human Services of a quality cancer care demonstration project for the purpose of establishing quality metrics and aligning Medicare payment incentives in the areas of treatment planning and follow-up cancer care planning for Medicare beneficiaries with cancer.
- Conducting of the demonstration project over a sufficient period (of not less than 2 years) to allow for refinement of metrics and reporting methodologies and for analyses.
- Evaluation of the QCCD project to determine oncologist participation in the project, to assess the cost effectiveness of the project, including an analysis of cost savings.
- Comparison outcomes of patients participating in the project to outcomes for those not participating.
- Report to the United States Congress not later than 90 days after the completion of the second year following the commencement of the QCCD project, with recommendations for legislation or administrative action.

== Treatment planning ==
- Identification and addressing of gaps in current quality measures related to the areas of active treatment planning and follow-up cancer care planning.
- Testing and validation of identified treatment planning and follow-up cancer care planning quality measures through a pay-for-reporting program with oncologists.
- Use of treatment planning quality measures, including documented pathology reports, documented clinical staging prior to initiation of first course of treatment, treatment education by oncology nursing staff and providing the patient with a written care plan which advises the patient of relevant options.
- Implementation of practice-endorsed treatment plans consistent with nationally recognized evidence-based guidelines.
- Documented discussion of clinical trials with the patient, or that no clinical trial is available.
- Documented discussion or coordination with other physicians involved in the patient's care.

== Post-treatment care ==
Documented conclusion of primary cancer care treatment and counseling session with the patient to provide recommendations for subsequent care. (Provision of a written document to the patient that describes the elements of the completed primary treatment, provides recommendations for subsequent care and is furnished in a form that appropriately takes into account cultural and linguistic needs of the individual.

== See also ==
- Medicare Quality Cancer Care Demonstration Act
