= Medicare Sustainable Growth Rate =

United States health care spending control

The Medicare Sustainable Growth Rate (SGR) was a method used by the Centers for Medicare and Medicaid Services (CMS) in the United States to control spending by Medicare on physician services.

President Barack Obama signed a bill into law on April 16, 2015, the Medicare Access and CHIP Reauthorization Act of 2015, which ended use of the SGR. The measure went into effect in July 2015.

Enacted by the Balanced Budget Act of 1997 to amend Section 1848(f) of the Social Security Act, the SGR replaced the Medicare Volume Performance Standard (MVPS), which was the previous method that CMS used in an attempt to control costs. Generally, this was a method to ensure that the yearly increase in the expense per Medicare beneficiary did not exceed the growth in GDP. Every year, the CMS sent a report to the Medicare Payment Advisory Commission, which advised the U.S. Congress on the previous year's total expenditures and the target expenditures. The report also included a conversion factor that would change the payments for physician services for the next year in order to match the target SGR. If the expenditures for the previous year exceeded the target expenditures, then the conversion factor would decrease payments for the next year. If the expenditures were less than expected, the conversion factor would increase the payments to physicians for the next year. On March 1 of each year, the physician fee schedule was updated accordingly. The implementation of the physician fee schedule update to meet the target SGR could be suspended or adjusted by Congress, as was done regularly (this was referred to as a doc fix). The repeated task of implementing a "doc fix" led to the permanent repeal of the SGR, or "permanent doc fix," in 2015.

== Formula ==
Section 1848(f)2 of the Social Security Act specified the formula for calculating the SGR. There were four factors used in calculating the SGR:

1. The estimated percentage change in fees for physicians’ services.
2. The estimated percentage change in the average number of Medicare fee-for-service beneficiaries.
3. The estimated 10-year average annual percentage change in real GDP per capita.
4. The estimated percentage change in expenditures due to changes in law or regulations.

Prior to the enactment of the Medicare Prescription Drug, Improvement, and Modernization Act (MMA), the SGR was calculated using a single year's real GDP per capita. After the MMA was enacted in 2003, the SGR was calculated using a 10-year annual average growth in real GDP per capita.

== Conversion factor ==
In order to meet the target SGR for the next calendar year, the physician fee schedule was updated accordingly. The update was calculated using two factors:

1. One plus the Medicare Economic Index (MEI)
2. One plus the Update Adjustment Factor (UAF)

The MEI measured the weighted average price change for various inputs involved with producing physicians’ services. The UAF compared actual and target expenditures and was determined by a formula that included the target and actual expenditures and the SGR. By law, the UAF could not exceed -7.0%.

=== Past adjustments ===
==== 2000 - 2009 adjustments ====
Section 101 of the Tax Relief and Health Care Act of 2006 (MIEA-TRHCA) provided a 1-year update of 0% for the conversion factor for CY 2007 and specified that the conversion factor for CY 2008 must be computed as if the 1-year update had never applied. Section 101 of the Medicare, Medicaid, and SCHIP Extension Act of 2007 (MMSEA) provided a 6-month increase of 0.5% in the CY 2008 conversion factor, from January 1, 2008, through June 30, 2008, and specified that the conversion factor for the remaining portion of 2008 and the conversion factors for CY 2009 and subsequent years must be computed as if the 6-month increase had never applied. Section 131 of the Medicare Improvements for Patients and Providers Act of 2008 (MIPPA) extended the increase in the CY 2008 conversion factor that was applicable for the first half of the year to the entire year, provided for a 1.1% increase to the CY 2009 conversion factor, and specified that the conversion factors for CY 2010 and subsequent years must be computed as if the increases had never applied.

==== 2010 - 2013 adjustments ====
The estimated SGR to go into effect on March 1, 2010, was -8.8%, and the conversion factor for the physician fee schedule was -21.3%. On March 3, 2010, Congress delayed the enforcement of the conversion factor until April 1, 2010, with the passage of the Temporary Extension Act of 2010. On April 15, 2010, Congress enacted the Continuing Extension Act of 2010 to again delay the implementation and extended the 2009 rate to June 1, 2010. On June 25, 2010, President Obama signed the Preservation of Access to Care for Medicare Beneficiaries and Pension Relief Act of 2010 that not only delayed implementation of the conversion factor until December 1, 2010, but also increased reimbursements by 2.2%. The 2.2% increase was retroactive to June 1, 2010, and expired on November 30, 2010. On December 16, 2010, President Obama signed the Medicare and Medicaid Extenders Act of 2010 into law, delaying the implementation of the SGR until January 1, 2012. This prevented a 25% decrease in Medicare reimbursements from taking effect on January 1, 2011.

When President Obama signed the Middle Class Tax Relief and Job Creation Act of 2012 on February 22, 2012, the implementation of the conversion factor was again delayed until January 1, 2013, when the cut was estimated to be 27.4%. Congress passed the American Taxpayer Relief Act of 2012 on January 1, 2013, which stated in section 601 that the conversion factor for 2013 "shall be zero percent." This delayed the implementation of the conversion factor until January 1, 2014.

==== 2014-2015 adjustments ====
The SGR was supposed to trigger the next set of Medicare reimbursement cuts on April 1, 2014, for cuts of 24 percent. In order to avoid this, the House and Senate turned to yet another bill to delay the SGR cuts until March 2015. That bill was the Protecting Access to Medicare Act of 2014 (H.R. 4302; 113th Congress).

== Previous MVPS/SGRs and conversion factors ==
The table on the left is a table of past years' SGR. Prior to the MMA, the MVPS was in use instead of the SGR. The Medicare, Medicaid, and SCHIP Balanced Budget Refinement Act of 1999 (BBRA) changed the calculation from fiscal year (FY) to calendar year (CY). The table on the right is a list of the actual yearly MEI and physician fee update conversion factor. The physician update reflects a weighted average for FY 1991-1993 when there were two different updates (one for surgery and one for other services), and for FY 1994 through FY 1997 when there were three different updates (for surgery, primary care, and other services). The Balanced Budget Act of 1997 consolidated service-specific updates so that starting in FY 1998, primary care, surgical, and nonsurgical services were updated by the same rate.

Year	MVPS/SGR
FY 1990	9.1%
FY 1991	7.3%
FY 1992	10.0%
FY 1993	10.0%
FY 1994	9.4%
FY 1995	7.5%
FY 1996	1.8%
FY 1997	-0.3%
FY 1998	3.2%
FY 1999	4.2%
FY 2000	6.9%
CY 2000	7.3%
CY 2001	4.5%
CY 2002	8.3%
CY 2003	7.3%
CY 2004	6.6%
CY 2005	4.2%
CY 2006	1.5%
CY 2007	3.5%
CY 2008	4.5%
CY 2009	6.4%
CY 2010	8.9%
CY 2011	4.7%

Year	Physician MEI increase	Physician update
1992	3.2%	1.9%
1993	2.7%	1.4%
1994	2.3%	7.0%
1995	2.1%	7.5%
1996	2.0%	0.8%
1997	2.0%	0.6%
1998	2.2%	2.3%
1999	2.3%	2.3%
2000	2.4%	5.5%
2001	2.1%	5.0%
2002	2.6%	−4.8%
2003	3.0%	1.7%
2004	2.9%	1.5%
2005	3.1%	1.5%
2006	2.8%	0.2%
2007	2.1%	0.0%
2008	1.8%	0.5%
2009	1.6%	1.1%
2010	1.2%	1.3%
2011	0.4%	0.9%
2012	0.6%	0.0%
2013	0.8% est	0.0%

== See also ==
- Health care reform
- Health Insurance Innovations
- Medicare Access and CHIP Reauthorization Act of 2015
- Resource-Based Relative Value Scale
