= Protecting Access to Medicare Act of 2014 =

United States law

- Long title: To amend the Social Security Act to extend Medicare payments to physicians and other provisions of the Medicare and Medicaid programs, and for other purposes.
- Nicknames: The "doc fix"
- Announced in: the 113th United States Congress
- Sponsored by: Rep. Joe Pitts (R-PA)

Citations
- Public law: Pub. L. 113–93 (text) (PDF)

Legislative history
- Introduced in the House as H.R. 4302 by Rep. Joe Pitts (R-PA) on March 26, 2014; Committee consideration by United States House Committee on the Budget, United States House Committee on Ways and Means, United States House Committee on Energy and Commerce; Passed the House on March 27, 2014 (voice vote); Passed the Senate on March 31, 2014 (Roll Call Vote 93: 64-35); Signed into law by President Barack Obama on April 1, 2014

The Protecting Access to Medicare Act of 2014 (H.R. 4302; Pub. L. 113–93 (text) (PDF)) is a law that delayed until March 2015 a pending cut to Medicare physician payment, a cut that had been regularly delayed for over a decade. Because the law only delayed and did not repeal the physician payment cut, it was a source of controversy.

The bill was signed into law on April 1, 2014, during the 113th United States Congress.

== Background ==
In the United States, Medicare is a national social insurance program, administered by the U.S. federal government since 1966, that guarantees access to health insurance for Americans aged 65 and older who have worked and paid into the system, younger people with disabilities, and a few other groups. As a social insurance program, Medicare spreads the financial risk associated with illness across society to protect everyone, and thus has a somewhat different social role from for-profit private insurers, which manage their risk portfolio by adjusting their pricing according to perceived risk.

In 2010, Medicare provided health insurance to 48 million Americans—40 million people age 65 and older and eight million younger people with disabilities. It was the primary payer for an estimated 15.3 million inpatient stays in 2011, representing 47.2 percent ($182.7 billion) of total aggregate inpatient hospital costs in the United States. On average, Medicare covers about half (48 percent) of health care costs for enrollees. Medicare enrollees must cover the rest of the cost. These out-of-pocket costs vary depending on the amount of health care a Medicare enrollee needs. They might include uncovered services—such as long-term, dental, hearing, and vision care—and supplemental insurance.

A formula, called the "Sustainable Growth Rate" (SGR) formula, was established in 1997 to make planned cuts to Medicare reimbursement rates. Congress has regularly avoided making these cuts since then by passing legislation, colloquially known as the "doc fix", to delay the cuts. Congress has been making these temporary changes for over a decade.

On March 14, 2014, the United States House of Representatives passed the SGR Repeal and Medicare Provider Payment Modernization Act of 2014 (H.R. 4015; 113th Congress), a bill that would have replaced the SGR formula, which determines the annual updates to payment rates for physicians’ services in Medicare, with new systems for establishing those payment rates. However, the bill would pay for these changes by delaying the Affordable Care Act's individual mandate requirement, a provision that was very unpopular with Democrats.

== Provisions of the bill ==
The Protecting Access to Medicare Act of 2014 would delay until March 2015 any cuts in the Medicare reimbursement rate. Without this or similar legislation, a 24 percent cut would go into effect on April 1, 2014.

This delay in cuts is predominantly paid for through other more targeted Medicare cuts to skilled nursing facilities, lab tests, overvalued physician services, and other providers. However, one-fifth of the delay is not paid for, and merely uses an accounting trick to move Medicare sequester cuts from 2025 to 2024 in order to give the appearance of balancing out. In order to accomplish this, the bill includes a provision that makes it exempt from pay-as-you-go "rules that require new spending to be offset with new revenues or cuts."

== Procedural history ==
The Protecting Access to Medicare Act of 2014 was introduced into the United States House of Representatives on March 26, 2014, by Rep. Joe Pitts (R-PA). It was referred to the United States House Committee on the Budget, the United States House Committee on Ways and Means, and the United States House Committee on Energy and Commerce. The bill was passed on March 27, 2014, through a controversial voice vote.

The Senate voted on March 31, 2014, to pass the bill 64–35 in Roll Call Vote 93. President Barack Obama signed the bill into law on April 1, 2014, when it became Pub. L. 113–93 (text) (PDF).

== Debate and discussion ==
Critics of the bill have objected to the fact that there are not enough offsets to balance the increased spending. Ed Lorenzen of the Committee for a Responsible Federal Budget argued that the "sequester realignment provision is a pure timing gimmick that produces no real savings and has no effect on the debt."

The American Medical Association (AMA) also opposed this bill because it wanted a solution that would be long-term, instead of yet another one-year delay. The AMA had supported the SGR Repeal and Medicare Provider Payment Modernization Act of 2014 (H.R. 4015; 113th Congress), instead of this bill. AMA president Ardis Dee Hoven argued strongly in favor of the SGR Repeal and Medicare Provider Payment Modernization Act of 2014, calling the current SGR "fiscally foolish" and "fatally-flawed." A coalition of medical groups wrote that "instead of reforming the Medicare physician system, Congress seems intent on imposing yet another round of arbitrary provider payment reductions to maintain a corrosive policy that essentially every member of Congress says should be scrapped."

A key addition to this bill not supported by CMS or HHS is Section 212. This section mandates that The HHS secretary will be blocked from implementing the International Classification of Diseases version 10 (ICD-10-CM/PCS) until 10/1/2015 at the earliest. Previously ICD-10 had been delayed from 10/1/13 to 10/1/14. On 2/28/14 CMS confirmed no further delays of ICD-10 would occur. The United States is the only developed nation that is still using the ICD-9 code set which was implemented in the 1970s. This delay not only slows the advancement of Healthcare modernization it negatively impacts patient care, safety, and clinical research of public health data that was set to be implemented 10/1/14. AHIMA estimates this delay will cost upwards of 6 Billion Dollars and stifle advancement in Healthcare infrastructure, technology, and practice.

Rep. Frank Pallone (D-NJ) opposed the bill because "I simply cannot support yet another temporary SGR patch" and thought that the bill "sets back months and months of hard work."

The House Doctor's Caucus opposed the bill.

House Democrats complained that the bill was released too closely to the deadline for passage, preventing anyone from fully understanding its contents.

Minority Leader Nancy Pelosi said that she supported the bill because she thought Republicans would use the situation, if the Medicare cuts went into effect, to attack Obamacare and because she didn't want seniors to worry about their access to their doctors.

Sponsor of the bill Rep. Joe Pitts (R-PA) said he still supports a permanent fix and is "sponsoring this bill today because it is my earnest hope that this is the last patch we will have to pass."

=== Voice vote controversy ===
The bill was originally scheduled to be considered under a suspension of the rules, a procedure that would have required the bill to receive a two-thirds majority to pass. However, when it became clear to the Republican leadership that they did not have enough votes to win a two-thirds majority, they changed the vote to a voice vote instead, scheduling that vote to take place when the House chamber was nearly empty. Opponents of the bill, unaware of this change, were not present to object to the voice vote and force a roll call instead. Rep. Mick Mulvaney (R-SC) called the vote "bullshit" and told reporters that he could not talk about "the budget because I am so pissed about the (doc fix)."

Rep. John Fleming (R-LA) said that, while he did not like the tactic used to get the bill passed, he did think the bill was better than the scheduled sharp reimbursement rate decrease. Fleming said that "they gave us a choice between something bad and something worse."

Rep. Justin Amash (R-MI) wrote on Twitter, "Short on votes for controversial spending bill, so GOP & Dem leaders rammed it through by 'voice vote' in empty House chamber. Not right."

Rep. Louie Gohmert (R-TX) called the tactic "outrageous" and said that "now I know that I need to get with some other members and make sure we have people on the floor, since we won't be sure what our own leadership is going to do."

The House Democratic leadership reportedly agreed to this quick change to a voice vote in advance. Pressure from Senate Majority Leader Harry Reid (D-NV) may have been involved in this decision, since the Senate needed a doc fix bill quickly in order to get one passed before the deadline. Many democratic supporters are disappointed in Nancy Pelosi (D-CA) who pushed House Democrats to a Voice Vote without additional debate or time necessary to submit amendments.

Some members found the tactic amusing. Rep. John Dingell (D-MI), the longest serving member of the House, told reporters "I've seen a lot of dumb things, but I've never seen anything as comical as this."

== See also ==
- List of bills in the 113th United States Congress
- Medicare Sustainable Growth Rate
