= Benefit period =

A benefit period is a length of time during which a benefit is paid. This may be a government benefit such as the British Housing Benefit, or a healthcare benefit system such as the American Medicare, or payment from an insurance policy such as a Payment protection insurance which covers mortgage or other commitments after accident, illness or redundancy. It may also be known as the Payment period.

A related terms is Benefit week used in calculation of entitlement to benefits.

== Medicare ==
In the context of the United States healthcare system Medicare, a benefit period begins the day a beneficiary is admitted to a hospital or skilled nursing facility (SNF). The benefit period ends when the beneficiary has not received any inpatient hospital care (or skilled care in a SNF) for 60 days in a row. If a beneficiary is readmitted into a hospital or SNF after one benefit period has ended, a new benefit period begins.

== Benefit year or season ==
A Benefit year or season is a period during which a sports person is granted the benefit of various activities by his or her club or other organisation.

See Benefit (sports)
