= Maurice Mazel =

American heart surgeon

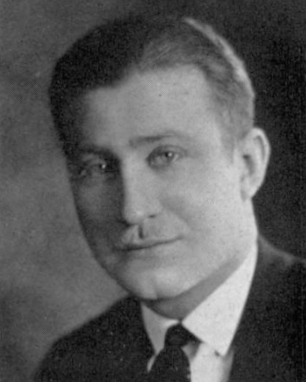
- Born: Maurice Seymour Mazel; January 12, 1895; Chicago, Illinois
- Died: January 30, 1980 (aged 85)
- Burial place: Rosehill Mausoleum
- Education: Northwestern University Medical School
- Occupation: Surgeon

Maurice Seymour Mazel (1895–1980) was a prominent Chicago heart surgeon who founded Edgewater Hospital.

== Biography ==
Maurice Mazel was born in Chicago on January 12, 1895. He graduated from Northwestern University in 1916, and from its medical school in 1918.

Mazel was treasurer of the corporation that built Edgewater Hospital in Chicago in 1928, and he served as its first medical director.

In 1977, investigators from the United States Department of Health, Education, and Welfare found that the hospital had improperly spent Medicare funds on resources used by a private clinic owned by Mazel. The case was not referred for prosecution, but $363,000 in reimbursements were withheld.

Mazel died on January 30, 1980, and was entombed at Rosehill Mausoleum.

Edgewater remained a major medical center for many decades, until it closed in December 2001 after substantial Medicare and Medicaid fraud blacklisted it from receiving further business from federal or state medical programs.
