= Medicare Access and CHIP Reauthorization Act of 2015 =

United States law

- Long title: An Act to amend Title XVIII of the Social Security Act to repeal the Medicare sustainable growth rate and strengthen Medicare access by improving physician payments and making other improvements, to reauthorize the Children's Health Insurance Program, and for other purposes
- Acronyms (colloquial): MACRA
- Nicknames: Permanent Doc Fix
- Enacted by: the 114th United States Congress

Citations
- Public law: Pub. L. 114–10 (text) (PDF)

Codification
- Acts amended: Social Security Act; Balanced Budget Act of 1997

Legislative history
- Introduced in the House as H.R. 2 by Michael C. Burgess (R-TX) on March 24, 2015; Passed the House on March 26, 2015 (392–37); Passed the Senate on April 14, 2015 (92–8); Signed into law by President Barack Obama on April 16, 2015

Medicare Access and CHIP Reauthorization Act of 2015 (MACRA), (H.R. 2, Pub. L. 114–10 (text) (PDF)) commonly called the Permanent Doc Fix, is a United States statute. Revising the Balanced Budget Act of 1997, the Bipartisan Act was the largest scale change to the American health care system following the Affordable Care Act in 2010.

== Provisions ==
MACRA's primary provisions are:

- changes to the way Medicare doctors are reimbursed
- increased funding
- extension to the Children's Health Insurance Program (CHIP).

MACRA related regulations also address incentives for use of health information technology by physicians and other providers. It created the Medicare Quality Payment Program. Clinicians can choose to participate in the Quality Payment Program through the Merit-based Incentive Payment System (MIPS) or Advanced Alternative Payment Models (APMs). MIPS is an incentive program that consolidates three incentive programs into one, for eligible physicians. APMs allow clinicians to earn incentives for participating in innovative payment models. In 2026, the conversion factor for both programs will be set at 0.75%.

The Government Accountability Office in partnership with DHHS is set to assist in the implementation of nationwide electronic health records (EHR), while simultaneously comparing and recommending such programs for providers; the EHR goal is set for December 31, 2018 under MACRA.

The US is set to transition from a fee for service system, which allowed physicians and providers to bill Medicare and Medicaid for services they provided to their patients, to a pay for performance based system using MIP, APM, and Accountable Care Organizations (ACO).

== Related ==
- Health Insurance Portability and Accountability Act (HIPAA)
