= Implementation history of the Affordable Care Act =

The Patient Protection and Affordable Care Act, often shortened to the Affordable Care Act (ACA) or nicknamed Obamacare, is a United States federal statute enacted by the 111th United States Congress and signed into law by President Barack Obama on March 23, 2010. Together with the Health Care and Education Reconciliation Act of 2010 amendment, it represents the U.S. healthcare system's most significant regulatory overhaul and expansion of coverage since the passage of Medicare and Medicaid in 1965. Once the law was signed, provisions began taking effect, in a process that continued for years. Some provisions never took effect, while others were deferred for various periods.

== Existing individual health plans ==
Plans purchased after the date of enactment, March 23, 2010, or old plans that changed in specified ways would eventually have to be replaced by ACA-compliant plans.

At various times during and after the ACA debate, Obama stated that "if you like your health care plan, you'll be able to keep your health care plan". However, in the fall 2013 millions of Americans with individual policies received notices that their insurance plans were terminated, and several million more risked seeing their current plans cancelled.

Obama's previous unambiguous assurance that consumers' could keep their own plans became a focal point for critics, who challenged his truthfulness. On November 7, 2013, President Obama stated: "I am sorry that [people losing their plans] are finding themselves in this situation based on assurances they got from me." Various bills were introduced in Congress to allow people to keep their plans.

In late 2013, the Obama Administration announced a transitional relief program that would let states and carriers allow non-compliant individual and small group policies to renew at the end of 2013. In March 2014, HHS allowed renewals as late as October 1, 2016. In February 2016, these plans were allowed to renew up until October 1, 2017, but with a termination date no later than December 31, 2017.

== 2010 ==
In June small business tax credits took effect. For certain small businesses, the credits reached up to 35% of premiums. At the same time, uninsured people with pre-existing conditions could access the federal high-risk pool. Also, participating employment-based plans could obtain reimbursement for a portion of the cost of providing health insurance to early retirees.

In July the Pre-Existing Condition Insurance Plan (PCIP) took effect to offer insurance to those who had been denied coverage by private insurance companies because of a pre-existing conditions. Despite estimates of up to 700,000 enrollees, at a cost of approximately $13,000/enrollee, only 56,257 enrolled at a $28,994 cost per enrollee.

== 2011 ==
As of September 23, 2010, pre-existing conditions could no longer be denied coverage for children's policies. HHS interpreted this rule as a mandate for "guaranteed issue", requiring insurers to issue policies to such children. By 2011, insurers had stopped marketing child-only policies in 17 states, as they sought to escape this requirement.

The average beneficiary in the prior coverage gap would have spent $1,504 in 2011 on prescriptions. Such recipients saved an average $603. The 50 percent discount on brand name drugs provided $581 and the increased Medicare share of generic drug costs provided the balance. Beneficiaries numbered 2 million

== 2012 ==
In National Federation of Independent Business v. Sebelius decided on June 28, 2012, the Supreme Court ruled that the individual mandate was constitutional when the associated penalties were construed as a tax. The decision allowed states to opt out of the Medicaid expansion. Several did so, although some later accepted the expansion.

== 2013 ==
In January 2013, the Internal Revenue Service ruled that the cost of covering only the individual employee would be considered in determining whether the cost of coverage exceeded 9.5% of income. Family plans would not be considered even if the cost was above the 9.5% income threshold. This was estimated to leave 2–4 million Americans unable to afford family coverage under their employers’ plans and ineligible for subsidies.

A June 2013, study found that the MLR provision had saved individual insurance consumers $1.2 billion in 2011 and $2.1 billion in 2012, reducing their 2012 costs by 7.5%. The bulk of the savings were in reduced premiums, but some came from MLR rebates.

On July 2, 2013, the Obama Administration announced that it would delay the implementation of the employer mandate until 2015.

The Community Living Assistance Services and Supports Act (or CLASS Act) was enacted as Title VIII of the ACA. It would have created a voluntary and public long-term care insurance option for employees. In October 2011 the administration announced it was unworkable and would be dropped. The CLASS Act was repealed January 1, 2013.

The launch for both the state and federal exchanges was troubled due to management and technical failings. HealthCare.gov, the website that offers insurance through the exchanges operated by the federal government, crashed on opening and suffered endless problems. Operations stabilized in 2014, although not all planned features were complete.

CMS reported in 2013 that, while costs per capita continued to rise, the rate of increase in annual healthcare costs had fallen since 2002. Per capita cost increases averaged 5.4% annually between 2000 and 2013. Costs relative to GDP, which had been rising, had stagnated since 2009. Several studies attempted to explain the reductions. Reasons included:

- Higher unemployment due to the 2008–2010 recession, which limited the ability of consumers to purchase healthcare;
- Out-of-pocket costs rose, reducing demand for healthcare services. The proportion of workers with employer-sponsored health insurance requiring a deductible climbed to about three-quarters in 2012 from about half in 2006.
- ACA changes that aim to shift the healthcare system from paying-for-quantity to paying-for-quality. Some changes occurred due to healthcare providers acting in anticipation of future implementation of reforms.

== 2014 ==
On July 30, 2014, the Government Accountability Office released a non-partisan study that concluded that the administration did not provide "effective planning or oversight practices" in developing the ACA website.

In Burwell v. Hobby Lobby the Supreme Court exempted closely held corporations with religious convictions from the contraception rule. In Wheaton College vs Burwell the Court issued an injunction allowing the evangelical college and other religiously affiliated nonprofit groups to completely ignore the contraceptive mandate.

A study found that average premiums for the second-cheapest ( silver) plan were 10–21% less than average individual market premiums in 2013, while covering many more conditions. Credit for the reduced premiums was attributed to increased competition stimulated by the larger market, greater authority to review premium increases, the MLR and risk corridors.

Many of the initial plans featured narrow networks of doctors and hospitals.

A 2016 analysis found that health care spending by the middle class was 8.9% of household spending in 2014.

== 2015 ==
By the beginning of the year, 11.7 million had signed up (ex-Medicaid). On December 31, 2015, about 8.8 million consumers had stayed in the program. Some 84 percent, or about 7.4 million, were subsidized.

Bronze plans were the second most popular in 2015, making up 22% of marketplace plan selections. Silver plans were the most popular, accounting for 67% of marketplace selections. Gold plans were 7%. Platinum plans accounted for 3%. On average across the four metal tiers, premiums were up 20% for HMOs and 18% for EPOs. Premiums for POS plans were up 15% from 2015 to 2016, while PPO premiums were up just 8%.

A 2015 study found 14% of privately insured consumers received a medical bill in the past two years from an out-of-network provider in the context of an overall in-network treatment event. Such out-of-network care is not subject to the lower negotiated rates of in-network care, increasing out-of-pocket costs. Another 2015 study found that the average out-of-network charges for the majority of 97 medical procedures examined "were 300% or higher compared to the corresponding Medicare fees" for those services.

Some 47% of the 2015 ACA plans sold on the Healthcare.gov exchange lacked standard out-of-network coverage. Enrollees in such plans typically received no coverage for out-of-network costs (except for emergencies or with prior authorization). A 2016 study on Healthcare.gov health plans found a 24 percent increase in the percentage of ACA plans that lacked standard out-of-network coverage.

The December spending bill delayed the onset of the "Cadillac tax" on expensive insurance plans by two years, until 2020.

The average price of non-generic drugs rose 16.2% in 2015 and 98.2% since 2011.

== 2016 ==
As of March 2016 11.1 million people had purchased exchange plans, while an estimated 9 million to 10 million people had gained Medicaid coverage, mostly low-income adults. 11.1 million were still covered, a decline of nearly 13 percent. 6.1 million uninsured 19- to 25-year-olds gained coverage.

=== Employers ===
A survey of New York businesses found an increase of 8.5 percent in health care costs, less than the prior year's survey had expected. A 10 percent increase was expected for 2017. Factors included increased premiums, higher drug costs, ACA and aging workers. Some firms lowered costs by increasing cost-sharing (for higher employee contributions, deductibles and co-payments). 60% planned to further increase cost-sharing. Coverage and benefits were not expected to change. Approximately one fifth said ACA had pushed them to reduce their workforce. A larger number said they were raising prices.

=== Insurers ===
The five major national insurers expected to lose money on ACA policies in 2016. UnitedHealth withdrew from the Georgia and Arkansas exchanges for 2017, citing heavy losses. Humana exited other markets, leaving it operating in 156 counties in 11 states for 2017. 225 counties across the country had access to only a single ACA insurer. A study released in May estimated that 664 counties would have one insurer in 2017.

Aetna cancelled planned expansion of its offerings and following an expected $300 million loss in 2016 and then withdrew from 11 of its 15 states. In August 2016 Anthem said that its offerings were losing money, but also that it would expand its participation if a pending merger with Cigna was approved. Aetna and Humana's exit for 2017 left 8 rural Arizona counties with only Blue Cross/Blue Shield.

Blue Cross/Blue Shield Minnesota announced that it would exit individual and family markets in Minnesota in 2017, due to financial losses of $500 million over three years.

Another analysis found that 17 percent of eligibles may have a single insurer option in 2017. North Carolina, Oklahoma, Alaska, Alabama, South Carolina and Wyoming were expected to have a single insurer, while only 2 percent of 2016 eligibles had only one choice.

Aetna, Humana, UnitedHealth Group also exited various individual markets. Many local Blue Cross plans sharply narrowed their networks. In 2016 two thirds of individual plans were narrow-network HMO plans.

One of the causes of insurer losses is the lower income, older and sicker enrollee population. One 2016 analysis reported that while 81% of the population with incomes from 100 to 150% of the federal poverty level signed up, only 45% of those from 150 to 200% did so. The percentage continued to decline as income rose: 2% of those above 400% enrolled.

=== Costs ===
The law is designed to pay subsidies in the form of tax credits to the individuals or families purchasing the insurance, based on income levels. Higher income consumers receive lower subsidies. While pre-subsidy prices rose considerably from 2016 to 2017, so did the subsidies, to reduce the after-subsidy cost to the consumer. For example, a study published in 2016 found that the average requested 2017 premium increase among 40-year-old non-smokers was about 9 percent, according to an analysis of 17 cities, although Blue Cross Blue Shield proposed increases of 40 percent in Alabama and 60 percent in Texas. However, some or all of these costs are offset by subsidies, paid as tax credits. For example, the Kaiser Foundation reported that for the second-lowest cost "Silver plan" (a plan often selected and used as the benchmark for determining financial assistance), a 40-year-old non-smoker making $30,000 per year would pay effectively the same amount in 2017 as they did in 2016 (about $208/month) after the subsidy/tax credit, despite large increases in the pre-subsidy price. This was consistent nationally. In other words, the subsidies increased along with the pre-subsidy price, fully offsetting the price increases.

=== Cooperatives ===
The number of ACA nonprofit insurance cooperatives for 2017 fell from 23 originally to 7 for 2017. The remaining 7 posted annual losses in 2015. A General Accountability Report found that co-ops’ 2015 premiums were generally below average. At the end of 2014, money co-ops and other ACA insurers had counted on risk corridor payments that didn't materialize. Maryland's Evergreen Health claims that ACA's risk-adjustment system does not adequately measure risk.

=== Medicaid ===
Newly elected Louisiana Governor John Bel Edwards issued an executive order to accept the expansion, becoming the 32nd state to do so. The program was expected to enroll an additional 300,000 Louisianans.

== 2017 ==
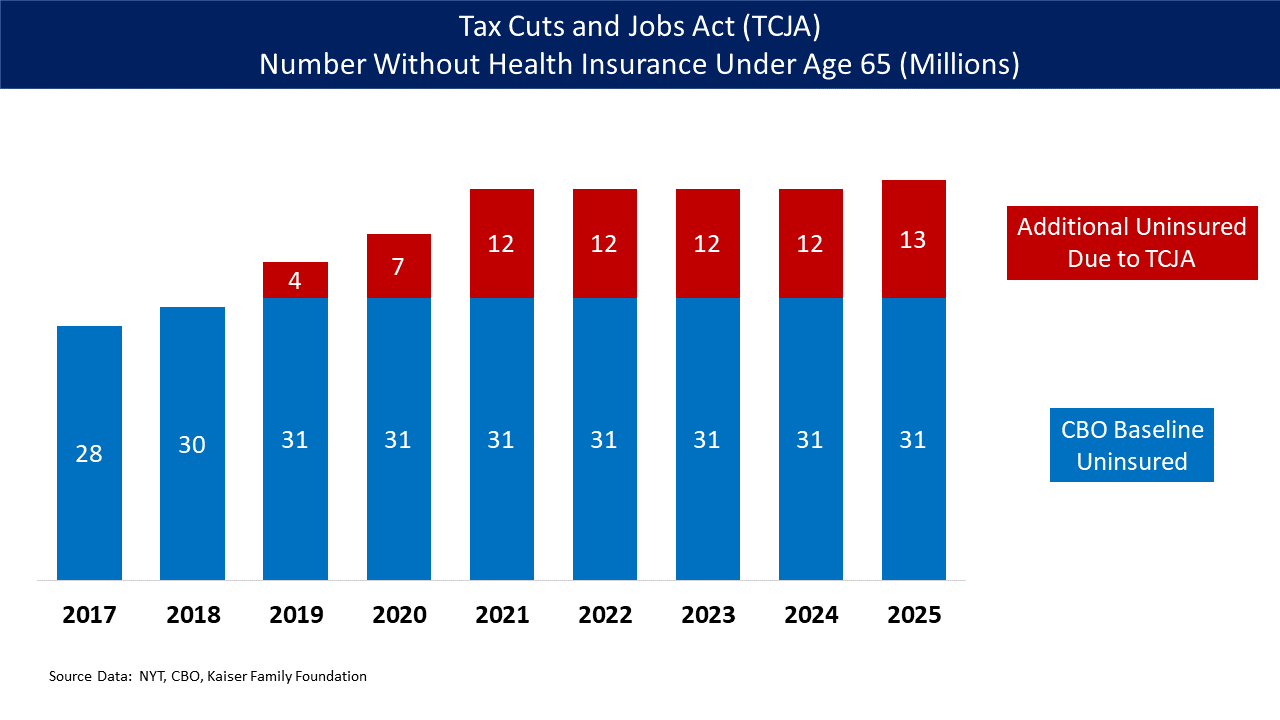
Tax Cuts and Jobs Act - Number of additional persons uninsured.

More than 9.2 million people signed up for care on the national exchange (healthcare.gov) for 2017, down some 400,000 from 2016. This decline was due primarily to the election of President Trump, who pulled advertising encouraging people to sign up for coverage, issued an executive order that attempts to eliminate the mandate, and has created significant uncertainty about the future of the ACA. Enrollments had been running ahead of 2016 prior to President Obama leaving office, with 9.8 million expected to sign-up, so President Trump's actions potentially cost about 600,000 national enrollments (i.e., 9.8 million expected − 9.2 million actual = 0.6 million impact). Of the 9.2 million, 3.0 million were new customers and 6.2 million were returning. The 9.2 million excludes the 11 states that run their own exchanges, which have signed up around 3 million additional people. These figures also exclude the additional coverage due to the Medicaid expansion, which covers another approximately 10 million persons, as described in the impact section above.

In February, Humana announced that it would withdraw from the individual insurance market in 2018, citing "further signs of an unbalanced risk pool." That month the IRS announced that it would not require that tax returns indicate that a person has health insurance, reducing the effectiveness of the individual mandate, in response to an executive order from President Donald Trump.

Aetna CEO Mark Bertolini stated that ACA was in a "death spiral" of escalating premiums and shrinking, skewed enrollment. However, a U.S. judge found that the Aetna CEO misrepresented why his company was leaving the exchanges; an important part of the reason was the Justice Department's opposition to the intended merger between Aetna and Humana. Aetna announced that it would exit the exchange market in all remaining states. It stated that its losses had grown from $100M in 2014 to $450M in 2016. Wellmark withdrew from Iowa in April. As of May, no insurer had indicated its intention to offer ACA insurance in Nebraska. Also in May Blue Cross and Blue Shield of Kansas City announced it would withdraw from Missouri and Kansas's individual markets in 2018, potentially leaving nearly 19,000 residents in Western Missouri without a coverage option. Anthem announced plans to withdraw from Ohio and later Wisconsin and Indiana, describing the market as "volatile" and referring to the difficulty in pricing its plans "due to the shrinking individual market as well as continual changes in federal operations, rules and guidance."

The CBO reported in March 2017 that the healthcare exchanges were expected to be stable; i.e., they were not in a "death spiral." In June, Centene announced that it intended to initiate coverage in Nevada, Kansas and Missouri and expand coverage in Ohio and Florida.

Molina Healthcare, a major Medicaid provider, said that it was considering exiting some markets in 2018, citing "too many unknowns with the marketplace program." Molina lost $110 million in 2016 due to having to contribute $325 million more than expected to the ACA "risk transfer" fund that compensated insurers with unprofitable risk pools. These pools were established to help prevent insurers from artificially selecting lower-risk pools.

In May the United States House of Representatives voted to repeal the ACA using the American Health Care Act of 2017.

On December 20, 2017, the individual mandate was repealed starting in 2019 via the Tax Cuts and Jobs Act of 2017. The CBO estimated that the repeal would cause 13 million people to lose their health insurance by 2027.

== 2019 ==
By 2019, 35 states and the District of Columbia had either expanded coverage via traditional Medicare or via an alternative program.

== Murray—Alexander Individual Market Stabilization Bill ==
Senator Lamar Alexander and Senator Patty Murray reached a compromise to amend the Affordable Care Act to fund cost cost-sharing reductions. President Trump had stopped paying the cost sharing subsidies and the Congressional Budget Office estimated his action would cost $200 billion, cause insurance sold on the exchange to cost 20% more and cause one million people to lose insurance. The proposed legislation will also provide more flexibility for state waivers, allow a new "Copper Plan" or catastrophic coverage for all, allow interstate insurance compacts, and redirect consumer fees to states for outreach.

== 2025 ==
The One Big Beautiful Bill Act (OBBBA) had a massive overhaul on major elements of the Affordable Care Act, primarily through accessing healthcare benefits. This overhaul resulted in hundreds of billions of health cuts especially for low-income and marginalized communities. Due to these cuts, 5-year long pilot programs like Section 1115 demonstration waivers are now at risk of losing funding due to the OBBBA's overhauls and cuts. While the Food is Medicine (FIM) initiative is operating on a Section 1115 demonstration waiver, there is more legislative action to continue its role past the 5 year temporary period. FIM organizations, such Project Open Hand in San Francisco, run in conjunction with state and federal governments through Medicaid and Medicare to ensure healthy nutrition and the alleviation of chronic illness. There has been significant action in 2022 in support of the FIM campaign, as, "...the Centers for Medicare and Medicaid Services (CMS) released a framework...to promote nutrition...". With the Trump-Vance administration focusing on health initiatives cut though OBBBA, and the larger Make America Healthy Again campaign, there could be a gradual change in attitudes towards ACA which supports FIM's food-based interventions such as nutritional culinary education and medically tailored meals. Through the ACA supported FIM, other models have opened that focus on an intersection of physical health through food nutritional programs as mental health and hygiene through Recipe4Health's experiment Behavioral Pharmacy aspect. Food environments have a large effect on human nutrition and health, and without state and federal aid, large organizations and their residents are at risk of losing human connection and nutritionally dense food for the medically compromised. The loss of these nutritional benefits due to budget cuts in the ACA have associations with worsening chronic illness and human health, with healthy diets being a "...very powerful tool in the prevention of pathological conditions that can compromise quality of life...".
