= Exchange Information Disclosure Act =

- Long title: To amend the Patient Protection and Affordable Care Act to require transparency in the operation of American Health Benefit Exchanges.
- Announced in: the 113th United States Congress
- Sponsored by: Rep. Lee Terry (R, NE-2)
- Number of co-sponsors: 1

Codification
- Acts affected: Patient Protection and Affordable Care Act
- U.S.C. sections affected: 42 U.S.C. § 18031, 42 U.S.C. § 18032
- Agencies affected: United States Congress, United States Department of Labor, United States Department of the Treasury, Department of Health and Human Services

Legislative history
- Introduced in the House as H.R. 3362 by Rep. Lee Terry (R, NE-2) on October 29, 2013; Committee consideration by United States House Committee on Energy and Commerce, United States House Committee on Ways and Means

The Exchange Information Disclosure Act (H.R. 3362) is a bill that would require the United States Department of Health and Human Services to submit weekly reports to Congress about how many people are using HealthCare.gov and signing up for health insurance. These reports would be due every Monday until March 31, 2015, and would be available to the public. The bill would "require weekly updates on the number of unique website visitors, new accounts, and new enrollments in a qualified health plan, as well as the level of coverage," separating the data by state. The bill would also require reports on efforts to fix the broken portions of the website.

The bill was introduced on October 29, 2013, in the United States House of Representatives during the 113th United States Congress. The House was scheduled to vote on it on January 10, 2014. On January 16, 2014, the bill was passed. 226 Republicans and 33 Democrats have voted yes to the bill.

== Background ==
The Patient Protection and Affordable Care Act (PPACA), commonly called the Affordable Care Act (ACA) or "Obamacare", is a United States federal statute signed into law by President Barack Obama on March 23, 2010. Together with the Health Care and Education Reconciliation Act, it represents the most significant regulatory overhaul of the U.S. healthcare system since the passage of Medicare and Medicaid in 1965.

The ACA was enacted with the goals of increasing the quality and affordability of health insurance, lowering the uninsured rate by expanding public and private insurance coverage, and reducing the costs of healthcare for individuals and the government. It introduced a number of mechanisms—including mandates, subsidies, and insurance exchanges—meant to increase coverage and affordability.

Healthcare.gov is a healthcare exchange website created by and operated under the United States federal government as per the provisions of the PPACA, designed to serve the residents of the thirty-six U.S. states that opted not to create their own state exchanges. Americans had until December 23, 2013, to sign up for coverage that would begin in January 2014. The official enrollment period deadline is the last day of March.

The PPACA detailed the exchange system as a way to comparison shop between different possible health insurance options for an individual within his or her state, with a visual format somewhat analogous to websites such as Amazon.com and Etsy. The contract allocated to CGI Group for building the federal website (Healthcare.gov) was valued at $292 million through to 2013, with estimates that the overall cost for building the website had reached over $500 million by October 2013.

The Congressional Budget Office (CBO) forecast that about seven million Americans would use the website to obtain coverage during the first year after its launch. The October 1, 2013, roll-out of Healthcare.gov went through as planned, despite the concurrent partial government shutdown. The website has been marred by serious technological problems since its launch, making it difficult for Americans to sign up for health insurance. On October 27, only about seven hundred thousand people filed applications, with even fewer actually enrolled in plans.

On October 20, President Barack Obama made a thirty-minute Rose Garden appearance discussing the varied issues. "There's no sugar coating: the website has been too slow, people have been getting stuck during the application process and I think it's fair to say that nobody's more frustrated by that than I am," he remarked. Promising a "tech surge" of the best people that his administration could assemble, he added, "there's no excuse for the problems, and these problems are getting fixed."

Issues with Healthcare.gov have persisted weeks past the launch, with the website unable to reach its related data services hub on October 28. Said glitches have particularly beleaguered Health and Human Services head Kathleen Sebelius. As of November 30, over 137,000 people have obtained insurance coverage from Healthcare.gov, a figure representing the strong improvement of the user experience since October yet still vastly trailing past U.S. government estimates.

The Exchange Information Disclosure Act would require the Obama Administration to provide more information related to these problems to Congress and the American public.

== Provisions of the bill ==
This summary is based largely on the summary provided by the Congressional Research Service, a public domain source.

The Exchange Information Disclosure Act would amend the Patient Protection and Affordable Care Act to expand reporting requirements related to health care exchanges. The bill would require the Secretary of Health and Human Services (HHS) to publish reports weekly through March 31, 2015, on:

(1) consumer interactions with healthcare.gov or subsequent sites and any efforts undertaken to remedy problems that impact taxpayers and consumers;
(2) calls to the federal customer service call center, including the number of calls received by the call center, problems identified by users, and referrals of those calls;
(3) all navigators and certified application counselors that have been trained and certified by health care exchanges; and
(4) all agents and brokers who have been trained and certified by the federal health care exchange.

== Procedural history ==
The Exchange Information Disclosure Act was introduced into the United States House of Representatives on October 29, 2013, by Rep. Lee Terry (R, NE-2). It was referred to the United States House Committee on Energy and Commerce and the United States House Committee on Ways and Means. On January 3, 2014, House Majority Leader Eric Cantor announced that the bill would be on the schedule for the week of January 6, 2014.

== Debate and discussion ==
Supporters of the bill argue that it would help Congress and the American people judge and follow the progress of the ACA.

Republicans argue that the bill is necessary because the Obama Administration has refused to provide information about usage of healthcare.gov and enrollment in new health insurance plans. Heritage Action notes that the bill is "designed to increase transparency in the operation of American Health Benefits Exchanges" in response to security and transparency failures, but believes "the only acceptable solution is to repeal the law entirely and replace it was a market-based, patient-centered alternative."

Some Republicans have also asked for additional information related to Obamacare that is not required in this bill. These Republicans are asking for information about the number of people who have actually paid their first monthly bill and to what degree the enrollees are young, healthy people, versus those who will likely need medical care.

One provision of the bill requires that a list of healthcare navigators be provided, with contact and affiliation information. This is a response to criticism that some navigators have been encouraging people to lie on their enrollment forms to get better deals.

Senator Lamar Alexander, who introduced similar legislation in the Senate, argued in favor of the bill. Alexander noted that "with WikiLeaks and Edward Snowden spilling our beans every day, what's happening on the Obamacare exchanges is the only secret left in Washington... the National Security Administration should learn some lessons from Secretary Sebelius."

Washington Post columnist Greg Sargent wrote that the vote on the Exchange Information Disclosure Act would "be partly about reassuring the base that GOP leaders are still taking the fight to Obamacare, dammit!!!" Sargent argued that the bill was "a political attack coming from a party that wants to see the law fail," even if some people would be interested in the actual data.

== See also ==
- List of bills in the 113th United States Congress
