= Enhanced Direct Enrollment =

Provision allowing private entities to enroll consumers in Qualified Health Plans

Enhanced Direct Enrollment (EDE) is a provision in the United States that allows certain private entities, including insurance carriers and web-brokers, to directly enroll consumers in Qualified Health Plans through the Health Insurance Marketplace without redirecting consumers to Healthcare.gov. Approved EDE partners may access a suite of APIs which allow them to directly submit and update applications on the federal exchange.

Using EDE allows private entities to offer consumers a smoother enrollment experience compared to the previous iteration, Direct Enrollment. Entities with EDE are also able to directly assist consumers with post-enrollment activities such as reporting changes to the application, submitting proof of citizenship or of qualifying life events, and downloading tax documents.

Approved partners include Catch, HealthSherpa, Welltheos, Softheon, GetInsured, Stride Health, Enterate, GuideWell Connect and INSXCloud.

== History ==
The passage of the Affordable Care Act in 2010 created insurance exchanges that sold health insurance plans that met the consumer protection standards outlined in the health law, including covering certain essential health benefits and protecting people with pre-existing conditions. Prior to the launch of Healthcare.gov, a March 2012 regulation gave private web-brokers the ability to enroll subsidy-eligible people in these “Marketplace” plans. By July 2013, the federal government had signed deals with five web-brokers to allow them to enroll people in plans through the federally-operated Marketplace which then served 36 states. Enrollment in Marketplace coverage through the Affordable Health Act’s health insurance exchanges began in October 2013.

Prior to the implementation of this pathway, consumers who wished to purchase a Marketplace health plan from a source other than Healthcare.gov could quote and select a plan on a web-broker’s site, but were redirected to Healthcare.gov to fill out the official application. Once the user completed the application and received their eligibility determination, they would be being redirected back to the web-broker’s site. This led many consumers to “drop off” during the process due to confusion or errors.

The Department of Health and Human Services first announced that they were considering creating an Enhanced Direct Enrollment pathway in the proposed Notice of Benefit and Payment Parameters for 2017. The subsequent final 2017 rule noted that many commenters supported the proposal, arguing that it would increase enrollment by improving the consumer experience and eliminating the back-and-forth redirecting that caused many consumers to quit the process. Other commenters expressed worries that allowing the change would expose consumers to misleading or inaccurate information on web-broker sites. HHS asked for comments on the Enhanced Direct Enrollment Pathway again in the Notice of Benefit and Payment Parameters for 2018.

The Centers for Medicare and Medicaid Services released detailed guidance for entities wishing to implement the pathway in February 2018. These guidelines noted that entities would be allowed to implement one of three phase options of the technology, each successive phase allowing the entity to directly enroll a greater percentage of consumers. Phase 1 entities can support only simple cases and Phase 2 entities can support common complex cases including applicants who are pregnant, full-time students, or noncitizens. Phase 3 entities can support all applicants. Entities choosing to implement any phase must undergo rigorous privacy and security audits. The Center for Medicare and Medicaid services then “reviews the audit results to ensure compliance with nearly 300 CMS security and privacy standards.” Entities wishing to use EDE must additionally “sign a privacy and security agreement with CMS.”

== Implementation ==
On December 4, 2018, HealthSherpa announced that they had become the first entity approved to launch EDE, going live with Phase 2. On December 11, 2018, Stride Health announced that they had launched EDE.

On April 5, 2019, the Centers for Medicare and Medicaid Services released a list of approved Enhanced Direct Enrollment partners. HealthSherpa and Stride were listed as the only two entities hosting EDE platforms, with seven insurance carriers listed as approved to use EDE but not hosting a platform. A March 2019 report from the Center for Budget and Policy Priorities noted that at that time, at least six of the entities approved were using HealthSherpa’s platform.

On July 16, 2019, Guidewell Connect announced that they had received approval to use EDE as a direct enrollment technology provider.

On July 23, 2019, GetInsured became the first company to be approved to go live with Phase 3 Enhanced Direct Enrollment technology.

On January 21, 2020, HealthSherpa announced they had enrolled over 1.2 million consumers using full Phase 3 Enhanced Direct Enrollment technology, representing 14% of active Healthcare.gov enrollment.

On October 28, 2020, the Centers for Medicare and Medicaid Services announced Enhanced Direct Enrollment approval for Catch and Benefitalign.

== Reactions ==
Many consumer advocates have expressed worries that allowing private entities to use the Enhanced Direct Enrollment pathway would negatively impact the consumer experience. Tara Straw, a policy analyst at the Center on Budget and Policy Priorities, wrote in a March 2019 report that “some insurers and brokers…..offer short-term health plans and other types of plans that don’t meet ACA consumer protections and benefit standards but pay high commissions to agents and brokers. Federal rules bar [EDE] entities from displaying these plans alongside marketplace plans, but some [web brokers] use screening tools to shift consumers away from marketplace options.” She also noted that not all web-brokers offer all plans available in a particular zip code, making it difficult for consumers to compare their plan options.

However, other groups - including the Center for Medicare and Medicaid Services itself, have argued that the pathway will foster innovation around the enrollment experience. In a November 2018 press release, CMS said the technology would allow “the private sector to come up with innovative ways to create a uniquely tailored end-to-end user experience.” In a blog post for Health Affairs, Katie Keith noted that some states "seem[ed] to be interested" in using the pathway “to create their own marketplaces that replace the profile of HealthCare.gov.” In a December 2018 press release, HealthSherpa noted that EDE would allow them to customize the enrollment experience for their nonprofit partners “to meet the needs of diverse and underserved communities.”
