= Counihan =

Counihan is a surname. Notable people with the surname include:

- Conor Counihan (born 1959), Irish Gaelic footballer
- John Counihan (1879–1953), Irish politician
- Kevin Counihan, American health care executive
- Noel Counihan (1913–1986), Australian painter, printmaker, cartoonist and illustrator
