= Suspending the Individual Mandate Penalty Law Equals Fairness Act =

Proposed United States law

- Long title: To amend the Internal Revenue Code of 1986 to delay the implementation of the penalty for failure to comply with the individual health insurance mandate.
- Acronyms (colloquial): SIMPLE Fairness Act
- Announced in: the 113th United States Congress
- Sponsored by: Rep. Lynn Jenkins (R, KS-2)
- Number of co-sponsors: 8

Codification
- Acts affected: Internal Revenue Code of 1986

Legislative history
- Introduced in the House as H.R. 4118 by Rep. Lynn Jenkins (R, KS-2) on February 28, 2014; Committee consideration by United States House Committee on Ways and Means; Passed the House on March 5, 2014 (Roll Call Vote 97: 250-160)

The Suspending the Individual Mandate Penalty Law Equals Fairness Act (H.R. 4118) is a bill that would delay for one year the imposition of penalties associated with the requirement that most residents of the United States have health insurance coverage beginning in 2014. This penalty was imposed by the Affordable Care Act. The penalty starts at 1 percent of taxable income in 2014, increasing to 2 percent in 2015 and 2.5 percent in 2016. The minimum payment in 2014 will be $95, unless that is changed by the passage of this law.

The bill was introduced into the United States House of Representatives during the 113th United States Congress.

== Background ==
The Affordable Care Act (commonly known as "Obamacare") requires all U.S. citizens and legal residents to have health insurance that meets the law's requirements, or else they have to pay a tax penalty. The requirement is known as the individual mandate. Under the individual mandate provision (sometimes called a "shared responsibility requirement" or "mandatory minimum coverage requirement"), individuals who are not covered by an acceptable health insurance policy will be charged an annual tax penalty of $95, or up to 1% of income over the filing minimum, whichever is greater; this will rise to a minimum of $695 ($2,085 for families), or 2.5% of income over the filing minimum, by 2016. Individuals who aren't covered will be assessed the penalty on their Federal tax return. In the wording of the law, a taxpayer who fails to pay the penalty "shall not be subject to any criminal prosecution or penalty" and cannot have liens or levies placed on their property, but the IRS will be able to withhold future tax refunds from them.

== Provisions of the bill ==
This summary is based largely on the summary provided by the Congressional Research Service, a public domain source.

The Suspending the Individual Mandate Penalty Law Equals Fairness Act or the SIMPLE Fairness Act would amend the Internal Revenue Code to delay until 2015 the imposition of the monthly penalty amount on individual taxpayers for failure to purchase minimum essential health care coverage.

== Congressional Budget Office report ==
This summary is based largely on the summary provided by the Congressional Budget Office, as introduced in the House of Representatives on February 28, 2014. This is a public domain source.

H.R. 4118 would delay the implementation of certain penalties related to the expansion of health insurance coverage established by the Affordable Care Act (ACA, Pub. L. 111–148 (text) (PDF) and the health care provisions of Pub. L. 111–152 (text) (PDF)). The legislation would delay for one year the imposition of penalties associated with the requirement that most residents of the United States have health insurance coverage beginning in 2014. In addition, H.R. 4118 would shift by one year the schedule of penalties for people who do not comply with that mandate.

The Congressional Budget Office (CBO) and the staff of the Joint Committee on Taxation (JCT) estimate that enacting H.R. 4118 would reduce federal deficits by roughly $10 billion over the 2014-2019 period and by roughly $9 billion over the 2014-2024 period. Pay-as-you-go procedures apply because enacting the legislation would affect direct spending and revenues.

JCT has determined that H.R. 4118 contains no intergovernmental or private-sector mandates as defined in the Unfunded Mandates Reform Act.

== Procedural history ==
The Suspending the Individual Mandate Penalty Law Equals Fairness Act was introduced on February 28, 2014 by Rep. Lynn Jenkins (R, KS-2). The bill was referred to the United States House Committee on Ways and Means. On February 29, 2014, House Majority Leader Eric Cantor announced that H.R. 4118 would be considered on March 5, 2014. On March 5, 2014, the House voted in Roll Call Vote 97 by a vote of 250-160. Twenty-seven Democrats voted in favor of the bill.

== Debate and discussion ==
Republicans argued that the bill was necessary to be fair to individual Americans, since the Obama administration had already delayed the penalties that would have applied to businesses.

President Barack Obama threatened to veto the bill and it "stands no chance" in the Senate.

This vote marked the 50th time the House Republicans had voted to change or repeal the Affordable Care Act since they became the majority in 2011.

== See also ==
- List of bills in the 113th United States Congress
- Patient Protection and Affordable Care Act
- Provisions of the Patient Protection and Affordable Care Act
- HealthCare.gov
