= Fairness for American Families Act =

Proposed United States law

- Long title: To delay the application of the individual health insurance mandate.
- Announced in: the 113th United States Congress
- Sponsored by: Rep. Todd C. Young (R, IN-9)
- Number of co-sponsors: 23

Codification
- Acts affected: Internal Revenue Code of 1986, Patient Protection and Affordable Care Act

Legislative history
- Introduced in the House as H.R. 2668 by Rep. Todd C. Young (R, IN-9) on July 11, 2013; Committee consideration by United States House Committee on Ways and Means; Passed the House on July 17, 2013 (251-174)

The Fairness for American Families Act (H.R. 2668) is a bill that would "amend the Internal Revenue Code, as amended by the Patient Protection and Affordable Care Act, to delay until 2015 the requirement that individuals maintain minimal essential health care coverage." The bill was introduced into the United States House of Representatives during the 113th United States Congress.

On July 2, 2013, the Obama Administration announced that it would be delaying one of the key requirements of the Patient Protection and Affordable Care Act (commonly known as "Obamacare"). The requirement that all companies which employed more than 50 workers must offer an employee health insurance plan or pay a fine would now be delayed until 2015, according to the Administration. The Administration, however, did not do anything to delay the individual health insurance mandate which was directed and individual people and families, rather than at companies and unions. In response, on July 11, 2013 by Rep. Todd Young (R-IN) introduced the Fairness for American Families Act, which would apply the same delay to the individual mandate requirement.

A second bill, the Authority for Mandate Delay Act (H.R. 2667), was introduced on July 11, 2013 by Rep. Timothy Griffin (R-AR). This bill would authorize the Obama Administration's decision to delay the employer mandate, a delay that many would consider illegal without explicit Congressional authorization.

== Background ==
The Patient Protection and Affordable Care Act (PPACA), commonly called Obamacare or the Affordable Care Act (ACA), is a United States federal statute signed into law by President Barack Obama on March 23, 2010. Together with the Health Care and Education Reconciliation Act, it represents the most significant government expansion and regulatory overhaul of the U.S. healthcare system since the passage of Medicare and Medicaid in 1965.

The ACA is aimed at increasing the affordability and rate of health insurance coverage for Americans, and reducing the overall costs of health care (for individuals and the government). It provides a number of mechanisms — including mandates, subsidies, and tax credits — to employers and individuals to increase the coverage rate and health insurance affordability. The law has failed to meet many of these goals, with some supporters now becoming opponents - including some unions. In May 2013, the United Food and Commercial Workers International Union, United Union of Roofers, Waterproofers and Allied Workers, and International Association of Firefighters complained about the increased costs caused by "requiring health plans to cover dependents up to age 26, eliminate annual or lifetime coverage limits and extend coverage to people with pre-existing conditions." In July 2013, a letter signed by the leaders of the Teamsters, UFCW, and UNITE-HERE stated, "the ACA will shatter not only our hard-earned health benefits, but destroy the foundation of the 40-hour work week that is the backbone of the American middle class... the law creates an incentive for employers to keep employees' work hours below 30 hours a week... we can no longer stand silent in the face of elements of the Affordable Care Act that will destroy the very health and wellbeing of our members along with millions of other hardworking Americans..."

On June 28, 2012, the United States Supreme Court upheld the constitutionality of most of the ACA in the case National Federation of Independent Business v. Sebelius.

The law was championed by President Barack Obama and supported by most Democrats, but Republicans have tried numerous times to overturn the law. When the Obama Administration announced that it would be delaying the implementation of part of the Patient Protection and Affordable Care Act, it was seen as a new opportunity to fight against the bill, leading to the proposal of the Authority for Mandate Delay Act and the Fairness for American Families Act.

== Provisions of the bill ==
This summary is based largely on the summary provided by the Congressional Research Service, a public domain source.

The Fairness for American Families Act would amend the Internal Revenue Code, as amended by the Patient Protection and Affordable Care Act, to delay until 2015 the requirement that individuals maintain minimal essential health care coverage.

== Procedural history ==
The Fairness for American Families Act was introduced into the House on July 11, 2013 by Rep. Todd Young (R-IN). It was referred to the United States House Committee on Ways and Means.The bill passed the House on July 17, 2013, by 251- 174 in Roll Call 363.

== Debate and discussion ==
When he introduced the Fairness for American Families Act, Rep. Young argued that "rather than driving healthcare costs down, the individual mandate is imposing a new tax and burdensome costs on middle class families" and therefore "hardworking Americans deserve the same exemptions that President Obama is unilaterally granting to businesses and labor unions." House Majority Leader Eric Cantor agreed with this, announcing that the House would work on this bill the week of July 15, 2013.

The New York Times (NYT) described Obama's decision to delay the employer mandate as a "self-inflicted wound" which Republicans saw as an opportunity. The NYT suggested that a Republican strategy might begin by having multiple votes - one on affirming/legalizing President Obama's decision to delay the employer mandate (which Democrats would back) and then one on delaying the individual mandate (which Democrats might now have difficulty voting against). The Obama Administration's response to the criticism about this issue was seen as not very strong; the Administration refused to send a representative to a hearing about the matter being held at the House of Representatives. Republicans may be able to use these two bills to put pressure on the Democrats, because opposing the Fairness for American Families Act while supporting the Authority for Mandate Delay Act "will make it appear as if they are providing a break to big business but not individuals."

== See also ==
- List of bills in the 113th United States Congress
- Presidency of Barack Obama
- Patient Protection and Affordable Care Act
- Health insurance mandate
- Health insurance coverage in the United States
