= Simple Health Plans =

Simple Health Plans, LLC
- Company type: Private
- Industry: Health Care, Advertising and Marketing, Telemarketing
- Founded: November 25, 2015; 10 years ago in Hollywood, Florida, USA
- Founders: Steven Dorfman and Matthew Spiewak
- Owner: Steven Dorfman
- Website: simplehealthplans.com
- Footnotes / references In receivership as of October 31, 2018 by Ackerman LLP and business operations shut down on November 1, 2018.

Simple Health Plans is a Florida limited liability company founded by Steven Dorfman and Matthew Spiewak in 2015. Simple Health and Simple Health Plans are also the trade name for Health Benefits One LLC, another Florida limited liability company founded by Steven Dorfman and Matthew Spiewak in 2012. The Federal Trade Commission has a preliminary injunction against the Simple Health Plans LLC and affiliated companies granted on May 14, 2019.

In 2018, the FTC sued Simple Health Plans, and affiliated companies, for allegedly deceptive sales tactics and "violating the FTC Act and the agency's Telemarketing Sales Rule". The company was "pretending to be affiliated with reputable insurances and organizations" such as AARP and Blue Cross Blue Shield, in addition to be claiming to be experts on Affordable Care Act insurance. Ads by the company also included logos by Anthem and Cigna, without any actual affiliation with the insurance companies. The company collected USD $100 million in commissions from the sale of misleading sale of limited benefit plans and medical discount memberships through a "network of deceptive websites" including trumpcarequotes.com and "approximately 128 third-party lead generation websites."

Health Insurance Innovations (HII), a publicly traded entity now known as Benefytt Technologies, served as the third party administrator for the vast majority of products sold by Simple Health to consumers. HII is the subject of numerous shareholder and consumer class action lawsuits, as well as regulatory actions, alleging that the company defrauded investors and policyholders. HII has a D− rating with the Better Business Bureau for, among other things, failing "to resolve underlying cause(s) of a pattern of complaints."

Assets of the companies and Steven Dorfman have been frozen by Darrin P. Gayles and a receivership appointed to take over. Seized assets included two luxury vehicles, a Lamborghini Aventador and Rolls-Royce Wraith.

The New York Times articles continued, "The commission described Mr. Dorfman as “the architect of this scam” and said he had “siphoned millions of dollars of proceeds from defrauded consumers to pay for private jet travel, gambling sprees in Las Vegas, the rent for his oceanfront condominium, luxury automobiles, over $1 million in jewelry, and even the nearly $300,000 cost of his recent wedding at the St. Regis Hotel in Miami".

== Affiliated Companies ==
Companies named as "subsidiaries, affiliates or successors" of Simple Health Plans by the FTC include:

- Simple Health Plans LLC
- Health Benefits One LLC
- Health Center Management LLC
- Innovative Customer Care LLC
- Simple Insurance Leads LLC
- Senior Benefits One LLC

The receivership's First Interim Report include the following "affiliated entities":

- Simple Insurance Leads
- Health Benefits Center Corporation
- Soluciones Omfri, SRL
- Venture Vocational Institute, Inc.
- HBC Direct, LLC
- NMS Insurance Agency, LLC d/b/a Essential Insurance Agency
- Shift Health Solutions, LLC
