= Provisions of the Affordable Care Act =

Provisions of US federal statute

The Affordable Care Act (ACA) is divided into 10 titles and contains provisions that became effective immediately, 90 days after enactment, and six months after enactment, as well as provisions phased in through to 2020. Below are some of the key provisions of the ACA. For simplicity, the amendments in the Health Care and Education Reconciliation Act of 2010 are integrated into this timeline.

== Provisions by effective date ==
=== Effective at enactment, March 23, 2010 ===
- The Food and Drug Administration is now authorized to approve generic versions of biologic drugs and grant biologics manufacturers 12 years of exclusive use before generics can be developed.
- The Medicaid drug rebate for brand name drugs, paid by drug manufacturers to the states, is increased to 23.1% (except for the rebate for clotting factors and drugs approved exclusively for pediatric use, which increases to 17.1%), and the rebate is extended to Medicaid managed care plans; the Medicaid rebate for non-innovator, multiple source drugs is increased to 13% of average manufacturer price.
- A non-profit Patient-Centered Outcomes Research Institute is established, independent from government, to undertake comparative effectiveness research. This is charged with examining the "relative health outcomes, clinical effectiveness, and appropriateness" of different medical treatments by evaluating existing studies and conducting its own. Its 19-member board is to include patients, doctors, hospitals, drug makers, device manufacturers, insurers, payers, government officials and health experts. It will not have the power to mandate or even endorse coverage rules or reimbursement for any particular treatment. Medicare may take the institute's research into account when deciding what procedures it will cover, so long as the new research is not the sole justification and the agency allows for public input. The bill prohibits the institute from developing or employing "a dollars per quality adjusted life year" (or any similar measure that discounts the value of a life because of an individual's disability) as a threshold to establish what type of health care is cost effective or recommended. This makes it different from the UK's National Institute for Health and Clinical Excellence, which determines cost-effectiveness directly based on quality-adjusted life year valuations.
- The Prevention and Public Health Fund was created to fund programs and research designed to increase chronic disease prevention.
- A National Prevention, Health Promotion and Public Health Council (National Prevention Council) was created to develop a national strategy on prevention, health promotion and public health; by, for example, disseminating evidenced-based recommendations on the use of clinical and community prevention services.
- The Indian Health Care Improvement Act was reauthorized and amended.
- Chain restaurants and food vendors with 20 or more locations are required to display the caloric content of their foods on menus, drive-through menus, and vending machines. Additional information, such as saturated fat, carbohydrate, and sodium content, must also be made available upon request. But first, the Food and Drug Administration has to come up with regulations. Two regulations – one applicable to restaurants and another to vending machines – have been proposed, but have not yet been made final.
- States can apply for a "State Plan Amendment" to expand family planning eligibility to the same eligibility as pregnancy related care through a state option rather than having to apply for a federal waiver.

=== Effective June 21, 2010 ===
- Adults with existing conditions became eligible to join a temporary high-risk pool, which will be superseded by the health care exchange in 2014. To qualify for coverage, applicants must have a pre-existing health condition and have been uninsured for at least the past six months. There is no age requirement. The new program sets premiums as if for a standard population and not for a population with a higher health risk. Allows premiums to vary by age (up to 3:1), geographic area, family composition and tobacco use (up to 1.5:1). Limit out-of-pocket spending to $5,950 for individuals and $11,900 for families, excluding premiums.

=== Effective July 1, 2010 ===
- The President established, within the Department of Health and Human Services (HHS), a council called the National Prevention, Health Promotion and Public Health Council to help begin to develop a National Prevention and Health Promotion Strategy. The Surgeon General shall serve as the chairperson of the new Council.
- A 10% sales tax on indoor tanning took effect.

=== Effective July 19, 2010 ===
- The Departments of Health and Human Services, Labor, and Treasury published interim final regulations requiring new plans and issuers to cover certain preventive services without any cost-sharing for the enrollee when delivered by in-network providers.

=== Effective September 23, 2010 ===
- Insurers are prohibited from imposing lifetime dollar limits on essential benefits, like hospital stays, in new policies issued.
- Dependents, mostly children, will be permitted to remain on their parents' insurance plan until their 26th birthday, and regulations implemented under the ACA include dependents that no longer live with their parents, are not a dependent on a parent's tax return, are no longer a student, or are married.
- Insurers are prohibited from excluding pre-existing medical conditions (except in grandfathered individual health insurance plans) for children under the age of 19.
- All new insurance plans must cover preventive care and medical screenings rated Level A or B by the U.S. Preventive Services Task Force. Insurers are prohibited from charging co-payments, co-insurance, or deductibles for these services.
- Individuals affected by the Medicare Part D coverage gap will receive a $250 rebate, and 50% of the gap will be eliminated in 2011. The gap will be eliminated by 2020.
- Insurers' abilities to enforce annual spending caps will be restricted, and completely prohibited by 2014.
- Insurers are prohibited from dropping policyholders when they get sick.
- Insurers are required to reveal details about administrative and executive expenditures.
- Insurers are required to implement an appeals process for coverage determination and claims on all new plans.
- Enhanced methods of fraud detection are implemented.
- Medicare is expanded to small, rural hospitals and facilities.
- Medicare patients with chronic illnesses must be monitored/evaluated on a 3-month basis for coverage of the medications for treatment of such illnesses.
- Companies that provide early retiree benefits for individuals aged 55–64 are eligible to participate in a temporary program that reduces premium costs.
- A new website installed by the Secretary of Health and Human Services will provide consumer insurance information for individuals and small businesses in all states.
- A temporary credit program is established to encourage private investment in new therapies for disease treatment and prevention.
- All new insurance plans must cover childhood immunizations and adult vaccinations recommended by the Advisory Committee on Immunization Practices (ACIP) without charging co-payments, co-insurance, or deductibles when provided by an in-network provider.

=== Effective January 1, 2011 ===
- Insurers must spend 80% (for individual or small group insurers) or 85% (for large group insurers) of premium dollars on health costs and claims, leaving only 20% or 15% respectively for administrative costs and profits, subject to various waivers and exemptions. If an insurer fails to meet this requirement, there is no penalty, but a rebate must be issued to the policy holder. This policy is known as the 'Medical Loss Ratio'.
- The Centers for Medicare and Medicaid Services is responsible for developing the Center for Medicare and Medicaid Innovation and overseeing the testing of innovative payment and delivery models.
- Flexible spending accounts, health reimbursement accounts, and health savings accounts cannot be used to pay for over-the-counter drugs, purchased without a prescription, except insulin.

=== Effective September 1, 2011 ===
- All health insurance companies must inform the public when they want to increase health insurance rates for individual or small group policies by an average of 10% or more. This policy is known as 'Rate Review'. States are provided with Health Insurance Rate Review Grants to enhance their rate review programs and bring greater transparency to the process.

=== Effective January 1, 2012 ===
- Employers must disclose the value of the benefits they provided beginning in 2012 for each employee's health insurance coverage on the employee's annual Form W-2's. This requirement was originally to be effective January 1, 2011, but was postponed by IRS Notice 2010–69 on October 23, 2010. Reporting is not required for any employer that was required to file fewer than 250 Forms W-2 in the preceding calendar year.
- New tax reporting changes were to come in effect. Lawmakers originally felt these changes would help prevent tax evasion by corporations. However, in April 2011, Congress passed and President Obama signed the Comprehensive 1099 Taxpayer Protection and Repayment of Exchange Subsidy Overpayments Act of 2011 repealing this provision, because it was burdensome to small businesses. Before the ACA, businesses were required to notify the IRS on form 1099 of certain payments to individuals for certain services or property over a reporting threshold of $600. Under the repealed law, reporting of payments to corporations would also be required. Originally it was expected to raise $17 billion over 10 years. The amendments made by Section 9006 of the ACA were designed to apply to payments made by businesses after December 31, 2011, but will no longer apply because of the repeal of the section.

=== Effective August 1, 2012 ===
- All new plans must cover certain preventive services such as mammograms and colonoscopies without charging a deductible, co-pay or coinsurance. Women's Preventive Services – including: well-woman visits; gestational diabetes screening; human papillomavirus (HPV) DNA testing for women age 30 and older; sexually transmitted infection counseling; human immunodeficiency virus (HIV) screening and counseling; FDA-approved contraceptive methods and contraceptive counseling; breastfeeding support, supplies and counseling; and domestic violence screening and counseling – will be covered without cost sharing. The requirement to cover FDA-approved contraceptive methods is also known as the contraceptive mandate.

=== Effective October 1, 2012 ===
- The Centers for Medicare & Medicaid Services (CMS) will begin the Readmissions Reduction Program, which requires CMS to reduce payments to IPPS hospitals with excess readmissions, effective for discharges beginning on October 1, 2012. The regulations that implement this provision are in subpart I of 42 CFR part 412 (§412.150 through §412.154). Starting in October, an estimated total of 2,217 hospitals across the nation will be penalized; however, only 307 of these hospitals will receive this year's maximum penalty, i.e., 1 percent off their base Medicare reimbursements. The penalty will be deducted from reimbursements each time a hospital submits a claim starting Oct. 1. The maximum penalty will increase after this year, to 2 percent of regular payments starting in October 2013 and then to 3 percent the following year. As an example, if a hospital received the maximum penalty of 1 percent and it submitted a claim for $20,000 for a stay, Medicare would reimburse it $19,800. Together, these 2,217 hospitals will forfeit more than $280 million in Medicare funds over the next year, i.e., until October 2013, as Medicare and Medicaid begin a wide-ranging push to start paying health care providers based on the quality of care they provide. The $280 million in penalties comprises about 0.3 percent of the total amount hospitals are paid by Medicare.

=== Effective January 1, 2013 ===
- Income from self-employment and wages of single individuals in excess of $200,000 annually will be subject to an additional tax of 0.9%. The threshold amount is $250,000 for a married couple filing jointly (threshold applies to joint compensation of the two spouses), or $125,000 for a married person filing separately. In addition, an additional Medicare tax of 3.8% will apply to unearned income, specifically the lesser of net investment income or the amount by which adjusted gross income exceeds $200,000 ($250,000 for a married couple filing jointly; $125,000 for a married person filing separately.)
- Beginning January 1, 2013, the limit on pre-tax contributions to healthcare flexible spending accounts will be capped at $2,500 per year.
- The threshold for itemizing medical expenses increases from 7.5% to 10% of adjusted gross income for taxpayers under age 65.
- Most medical devices become subject to a 2.3% excise tax collected at the time of purchase. (The ACA provided for a 2.6% tax, but this was reduced to 2.3% by the Reconciliation Act). This tax will also apply to some medical devices, such as examination gloves and catheters, that are used in veterinary medicine.
- Insurance companies are required to use simpler, more standardized paperwork, with the intention of helping consumers make apples-to-apples comparisons between the prices and benefits of different health plans.

=== Effective August 1, 2013 ===
- Religious organizations that were given an extra year to implement the contraceptive mandate are no longer exempt. Certain non-exempt, non-grandfathered group health plans established and maintained by non-profit organizations with religious objections to covering contraceptive services may take advantage of a one-year enforcement safe harbor (i.e., until the first plan year beginning on or after August 1, 2013) by timely satisfying certain requirements set forth by the U.S. Department of Health and Human Services.

=== Effective October 1, 2013 ===
- Individuals may enroll in health insurance plans offered through state-based health insurance exchanges, or through the federal exchange in states that opted not to develop their own state-based exchange. Coverage begins on January 1, 2014. Open enrollment through the health insurance exchanges ends on March 31, 2014, after which time uninsured individuals generally may not purchase insurance through an exchange until the following open enrollment period. In subsequent years, the open enrollment period will start on October 1 and end on December 7.

=== Effective January 1, 2014 ===
ACA Medicaid expansion by state. Not adopted Adopted Implemented

United States Department of Health and Human Services (HHS) federal poverty level in 2014
Persons in Family Unit	48 Contiguous States and D.C.	Alaska	Hawaii
1	$11,670	$14,580	$13,420
2	$15,730	$19,660	$18,090
3	$19,790	$24,740	$22,760
4	$23,850	$29,820	$27,430
5	$27,910	$34,900	$32,100
6	$31,970	$39,980	$36,770
7	$36,030	$45,060	$41,440
8	$40,090	$50,140	$46,110
Each additional person adds	$4,060	$5,080	$4,670

- Insurers are prohibited from denying coverage (or charging higher rates) to any individual based on pre-existing medical conditions or gender.
- Insurers are prohibited from establishing annual spending caps of dollar amounts on essential health benefits.
- Under the individual mandate provision (sometimes called a "shared responsibility requirement" or "mandatory minimum coverage requirement"), individuals who are not covered by an acceptable health insurance policy will be charged an annual tax penalty of $95, or up to 1% of income over the filing minimum, whichever is greater; this will rise to a minimum of $695 ($2,085 for families), or 2.5% of income over the filing minimum, by 2016. The penalty is prorated, meaning that if a person or family have coverage for part of the year they won't be liable if they lack coverage for less than a three-month period during the year. Exemptions are permitted for religious reasons, members of health care sharing ministries, or for those for whom the least expensive policy would exceed 8% of their income. Also exempted are US citizens who qualify as residents of a foreign country under the IRS foreign earned income exclusion rule. In 2010, the Commissioner speculated that insurance providers would supply a form confirming essential coverage to both individuals and the IRS; individuals would attach this form to their Federal tax return. Those who aren't covered will be assessed the penalty on their Federal tax return. In the wording of the law, a taxpayer who fails to pay the penalty "shall not be subject to any criminal prosecution or penalty" and cannot have liens or levies placed on their property, but the IRS will be able to withhold future tax refunds from them. (Ends in 2019. Repealed by the Tax Cuts and Jobs Act of 2017)
- In participating states, Medicaid eligibility is expanded; all individuals with income up to 133% of the poverty line qualify for coverage, including adults without dependent children. The law also provides for a 5% "income disregard", making the effective income eligibility limit 138% of the poverty line. States may choose to increase the income eligibility limit beyond this minimum requirement. As written, the ACA withheld all Medicaid funding from states declining to participate in the expansion. However, the Supreme Court ruled in National Federation of Independent Business v. Sebelius (2012) that this withdrawal of funding was unconstitutionally coercive and that individual states had the right to opt out of the Medicaid expansion without losing pre-existing Medicaid funding from the federal government. For states that do expand Medicaid, the law provides that the federal government will pay for 100% of the expansion for the first three years, then gradually reduce its subsidy to 90% by 2020. As of August 2016, 31 states and the District of Columbia have expanded Medicaid. (See: State rejections of Medicaid expansion).
- Health insurance exchanges are established, and subsidies for insurance premiums are given to individuals who buy a plan from an exchange and have a household modified adjusted gross income between 100% and 400% of the federal poverty line. Section 1401(36B) of PPACA explains that each subsidy will be provided as an advanceable, refundable tax credit and gives a formula for its calculation. A refundable tax credit is a way to provide government benefits to individuals who may have no tax liability (such as the earned income tax credit). The formula was changed in the amendments (HR 4872) passed March 23, 2010, in section 1001. To qualify for the subsidy, the beneficiaries cannot be eligible for other acceptable coverage. The U.S. Department of Health and Human Services (HHS) and Internal Revenue Service (IRS) on May 23, 2012, issued joint final rules regarding implementation of the new state-based health insurance exchanges to cover how the exchanges will determine eligibility for uninsured individuals and employees of small businesses seeking to buy insurance on the exchanges, as well as how the exchanges will handle eligibility determinations for low-income individuals applying for newly expanded Medicaid benefits. Premium caps have been delayed for a year on group plans, to give employers time to arrange new accounting systems, but the caps are still planned to take effect on schedule for insurance plans on the exchanges; the HHS and the Congressional Research Service calculated what the income-based premium caps for a "silver" healthcare plan for a family of four would be in 2014:

Health Insurance Premiums and Cost Sharing under PPACA for Average Family of 4
Income % of federal poverty level	Premium Cap as a Percentage of Income	Income $ (family of 4)^{a}	Max Annual Out-of-Pocket Premium	Premium Savings^{b}	Additional Cost-Sharing Subsidy
100%	2%	$23,850	$477	$10,851	$5,040
133%	3%	$31,721	$952	$10,376	$5,040
150%	4%	$35,775	$1,431	$9,897	$5,040
200%	6.3%	$47,700	$3,005	$8,323	$4,000
250%	8.05%	$59,625	$4,800	$6,528	$1,930
300%	9.5%	$71,550	$6,797	$4,531	$1,480
350%	9.5%	$83,475	$7,930	$3,398	$1,480
400%	9.5%	$95,400	$9,063	$2,265	$1,480
1. The 2014 FPL is $11,670 for a single person and about $23,850 for family of four. See Subsidy Calculator for specific dollar amount.; 2. DHHS and CBO estimate the average annual premium cost in 2014 will be $11,328 for a family of 4 without the reform.

Maximum Out-of-Pocket Premium Payments

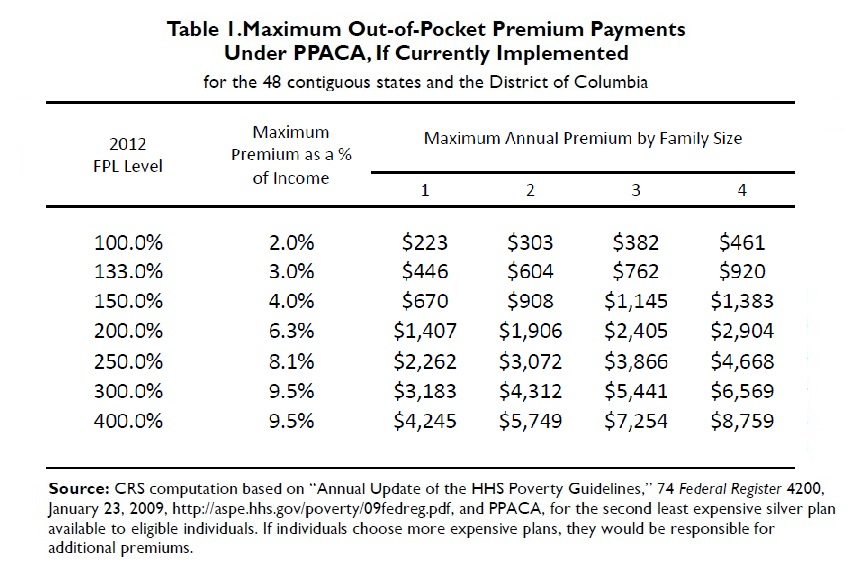
Maximum Out-of-Pocket Premium Payments Under PPACA by Family Size and federal poverty level. (Source: CRS)

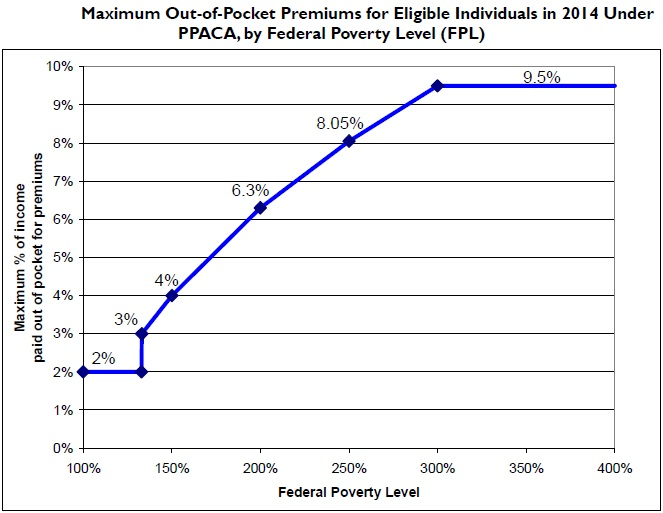
Maximum Out-of-Pocket Premium as Percentage of Family Income and federal poverty level (Source: CRS)

- Two federally regulated "multi-state plans" (MSP)—one of which must be offered by a non-profit insurer, and the other cannot cover abortion services—become available in a majority of state health insurance exchanges. The MSPs must abide by the same federal regulations required of an individual state's qualified health plans on the exchanges, and must provide identical cover privileges and premiums in all states. MSPs will be phased in nationally, being available in 60% of all states in 2014, 70% in 2015, 85% in 2016, and 100% in 2017.
- Section 2708 to the Public Health Service Act becomes effective, which prohibits patient eligibility waiting periods in excess of 90 days for group health plan coverage. The 90-day rule applies to all grandfathered and non-grandfathered group health plans and group health insurance issuers, including multiemployer health plans and single-employer group health plans pursuant to collective bargaining arrangements. Plans will still be allowed to impose eligibility requirements based on factors other than the lapse of time; for example, a health plan can restrict eligibility to employees who work at a particular location or who are in an eligible job classification. The waiting period limitation means that coverage must be effective no later than the 91st day after the employee satisfies the substantive eligibility requirements.
- Two years of tax credits will be offered to qualified small businesses. To receive the full benefit of a 50% premium subsidy, the small business must have an average payroll per full-time equivalent ("FTE") employee of no more than $50,000 and have no more than 25 FTEs. For the purposes of the calculation of FTEs, seasonal employees, and owners and their relations, are not considered. The subsidy is reduced by 3.35 percentage points per additional employee and 2 percentage points per additional $1,000 of average compensation. As an example, a 16 FTE firm with a $35,000 average salary would be entitled to a 10% premium subsidy.
- A $2,000 per employee penalty will be imposed on employers with more than 50 full-time employees who do not offer health insurance to their full-time workers (as amended by the reconciliation bill) – the 'Employer mandate'. "Full-time" is defined as, with respect to any month, an employee who is employed on average at least 30 hours of service per week. In July 2013, the Obama administration announced this penalty would not be enforced until January 1, 2015.
- For employer-sponsored plans, a $2,000 maximum annual deductible is established for any plan covering a single individual or a $4,000 maximum annual deductible for any other plan (see 111HR3590ENR, section 1302). These limits can be increased under rules set in section 1302. This provision was repealed on April 1, 2014
- To finance part of the new spending, spending and coverage cuts are made to Medicare Advantage, the growth of Medicare provider payments are slowed (in part through the creation of a new Independent Payment Advisory Board), Medicare and Medicaid drug reimbursement rates are decreased, and other Medicare and Medicaid spending is cut.
- Members of Congress and their staff are only offered health care plans through the exchanges or plans otherwise established by the bill (instead of the Federal Employees Health Benefits Program that they currently use).
- A new excise tax goes into effect that is applicable to pharmaceutical companies and is based on the market share of the company; it is expected to create $2.5 billion in annual revenue.
- Health insurance companies become subject to a new excise tax based on their market share; the rate gradually rises between 2014 and 2018 and thereafter increases at the rate of inflation. The tax is expected to yield up to $14.3 billion in annual revenue.
- The qualifying medical expenses deduction for Schedule A tax filings increases from 7.5% to 10% of adjusted gross income (AGI) for taxpayers under age 65.
- Consumer Operated and Oriented Plans (CO-OP), which are member-governed non-profit insurers, entitled to a 5-year federal loan, are permitted to start providing health care coverage.
- The Community Living Assistance Services and Supports Act (CLASS Act) provision would have created a voluntary long-term care insurance program, but in October 2011 the Department of Health and Human Services announced that the provision was unworkable and would be dropped. The CLASS Act was repealed January 1, 2013.

=== Effective October 1, 2014 ===
- Federal payments to disproportionate share hospitals, which are hospitals that treat large numbers of indigent patients, are reduced. The payments will subsequently be allowed rise based on the percentage of the population that is uninsured in each state.

=== Effective January 1, 2015 ===
- CMS begins using the Medicare fee schedule to give larger payments to physicians who provide high-quality care compared with cost.
- The "Employer Mandate" (originally scheduled to take effect on January 1, 2014) goes into effect for employers with 100 or more employees.

=== Effective October 1, 2015 ===
- States are allowed to shift children eligible for care under the Children's Health Insurance Program to health care plans sold on their exchanges, as long as HHS approves.

=== Effective January 1, 2016 ===
- States are permitted to form health care choice compacts and allows insurers to sell policies in any state participating in the compact.
- The "Employer Mandate" (originally scheduled to take effect on January 1, 2014) goes into effect for employers with 50 to 99 employees.

=== Effective January 1, 2017 ===
- Under Section 1332 of the Affordable Care Act, a state may apply to the Secretary of Health and Human Services for a renewable "waiver for state innovation" provided that the state passes legislation implementing an alternative health care plan meeting certain criteria. The decision of whether to grant the five-year waiver is up to the Secretary (who must annually report to Congress on the waiver process) after a public comment period. A state receiving the waiver would be exempt from some of the central requirements of the ACA, including the individual mandate, the creation by the state of an insurance exchange, and the penalty for certain employers not providing coverage. The state would also receive compensation equal to the aggregate amount of any federal subsidies and tax credits for which its residents and employers would have been eligible under the ACA plan, but which cannot be paid out due to the structure of the state plan. Before beginning the process of applying for an innovation waiver, states are required to organize "sufficient" opportunities for public commentary and meaningful feedback of the proposed system. To qualify for the waiver, the state plan must provide insurance at least as comprehensive and as affordable as that required by the ACA, must cover at least as many residents as the ACA plan would, and cannot increase the federal deficit. The coverage must continue to meet the consumer protection requirements of the ACA, such as the prohibition on increasing premiums because of pre-existing conditions. A bipartisan bill sponsored by Senators Ron Wyden and Scott Brown, and supported by President Obama, proposed making waivers available in 2014 rather than 2017, so that, for example, states that wish to implement an alternative plan need not set up an insurance exchange only to dismantle it a short time later.
  - In April 2011, Vermont announced its intention to pursue a waiver to implement a single-payer health care system; Vermont dropped the plans in December 2014. In September 2011, Montana announced it would also be seeking a waiver to set up its own single-payer system.
  - In September 2015, Hawaii became the first state to formally post a draft of the Section 1332 waiver, which proposed a state-level single-payer healthcare system. The draft requested an allowance to forgo several sections of the Affordable Care Act in conflict with the existing state healthcare system established in 1974, the Hawaii Prepaid Health Care Act (also known as Prepaid). Prepaid enforces employer mandated health insurance similar to the ACA's provisions, but its regulations are more stringent, creating challenges to their pre-existing infrastructure.
  - Massachusetts, Vermont, and California have also filed state innovation waivers within 2015–2016. Like Hawaii, Massachusetts and Vermont proposed drafts seeking exceptions on the basis of pre-existing employer coverage mandates, while California's waiver sought sources of coverage for undocumented immigrants.
  - There are a number of other states that have shown an interest in pursuing innovation waivers in the future. Many of these states (such as Arkansas and Kentucky) are primarily focused on finding novel approaches to utilize current Medicaid funding.
- States may allow large employers and multi-employer health plans to purchase coverage in the health insurance exchange.
- The two federally regulated "multi-state plans" (MSPs) that began being phased into state health insurance exchanges on January 1, 2014, become available in every state.
- The threshold for the itemized medical expense deduction increases from 7.5% to 10% of AGI for all taxpayers. This ends the 3-year delay for taxpayers over age 65. (Delayed until 2019 by the Tax Cuts and Jobs Act of 2017)

=== Effective January 1, 2018 ===
- A 40% excise tax on high cost ("Cadillac") insurance plans is introduced. The tax (as amended by the reconciliation bill) is on insurance premiums in excess of $27,500 (family plans) and $10,200 (individual plans), and it is increased to $30,950 (family) and $11,850 (individual) for retirees and employees in high risk professions. The dollar thresholds are indexed with inflation; employers with higher costs on account of the age or gender demographics of their employees may value their coverage using the age and gender demographics of a national risk pool. (Postponed until January 1, 2020)
- All health insurance plans must cover approved preventive care and checkups without co-payment. This ends the previous exemption for "grandfathered" health plans that were in existence prior to the passage of the ACA.

=== Effective January 1, 2019 ===
- Medicaid extends coverage to former foster care youths who were in foster care for at least six months and are under 25 years old.
- The increase in the threshold for the itemized medical expense deduction from 7.5% to 10% of AGI (originally scheduled to take effect on January 1, 2017) goes into effect (per the Tax Cuts and Jobs Act of 2017).
- The repeal of the "individual mandate" by the Tax Cuts and Jobs Act of 2017 goes into effect, reducing the tax penalty to zero.

=== Effective January 1, 2020 ===
- The Medicare Part D coverage gap (commonly called the "donut hole") will be completely phased out and hence closed.
- The "Cadillac Tax" (originally scheduled to take effect on January 1, 2018) will go into effect. (repealed in late 2019 before taking effect)

== Temporary waivers during implementation, 2010–2011 ==
During the implementation of the law, there were interim regulations put in place for a specific type of employer-funded insurance, the so-called "mini-med" or limited-benefit plans, which are low-cost to employers who buy them for their employees, but cap coverage at a very low level. The waivers allowed employers to temporarily avoid the regulations ending annual and lifetime limits on coverage, and were put in place to encourage employers and insurers offering mini-med plans not to withdraw medical coverage before those regulations come into force, by which time small employers and individuals will be able to buy non-capped coverage through the exchanges. Employers were only granted a waiver if they could show that complying with the limit would mean a significant decrease in employees' benefits coverage or a significant increase in employees' premiums.

By January 26, 2011, HHS said it had granted a total of 733 waivers for 2011, covering 2.1 million people, or about 1% of the privately insured population. In June 2011, the Obama Administration announced that all applications for new waivers and renewals of existing ones had to be filed by September 22 of that year, and no new waivers would be approved after this date.

The limited-benefit plans were sometimes offered to low-paid and part-time workers, for example in fast food restaurants or purchased direct from an insurer. Most company-provided health insurance policies starting on or after September 23, 2010, and before September 23, 2011, may not set an annual coverage cap lower than $750,000, a lower limit that is raised in stages until 2014, by which time no insurance caps are allowed at all. By 2014, no health insurance, whether sold in the individual or group market, will be allowed to place an annual cap on coverage.

Among those receiving waivers were employers, large insurers, such as Aetna and Cigna, and union plans covering about one million employees. McDonald's, one of the employers that received a waiver, has 30,000 hourly employees whose plans have annual caps of $10,000. The waivers are issued for one year and can be reapplied for. Referring to the adjustments as "a balancing act", Nancy-Ann DeParle, director of the Office of Health Reform at the White House, said, "The president wants to have a smooth glide path to 2014."

== Delays ==
On July 2, 2013, the Obama administration announced on the Treasury Department's website that it would delay the employer mandate for one year, under Proposed Regulations REG-138006-12 until 2015. In the statement, the administration said that they were delaying implementation in order to meet two goals: "First, it will allow us to consider ways to simplify the new reporting requirements consistent with the law. Second, it will provide time to adapt health coverage and reporting systems while employers are moving toward making health coverage affordable and accessible for their employees."

The announcement was met with strong criticism by some who claimed that the authority to delay the implementation of the law lay with Congress. Senate Minority Leader Mitch McConnell argued that President Obama's authorization to delay the provision exceeded the limits of his executive power. House Republicans brought two bills to a vote to draw attention to the issue: The Authority for Mandate Delay Act; and the Fairness for American Families Act, which would apply the same delay to the individual mandate, arguing that the individual mandate should be treated the same way – an action which the Obama administration opposes.

Constitutional scholar Simon Lazarus countered critics, saying that the delay was a lawful discretion of Executive power: "In effect, the Administration explains the delay as a sensible adjustment to phase-in enforcement, not a refusal to enforce… To be sure, the federal Administrative Procedure Act authorizes federal courts to compel agencies to initiate statutorily required actions that have been 'unreasonably delayed.' But courts have found delays to be unreasonable only in rare cases where, unlike this one, inaction had lasted for several years, and the recalcitrant agency could offer neither a persuasive excuse nor a credible end to its dithering." Critics of the House Republicans' comparison of the employer and individual mandate also pointed out that the two provisions are qualitatively different.

In August, another provision was delayed for a year: the premium caps on group plans. This was to give employers time to arrange new accounting systems for the premium caps, but the caps are still planned to take effect on schedule for insurance plans on the exchanges.

On 10 February 2014, the Treasury Department issued Treasury Decision 9655, which are final regulation, that it would delay the employer mandate until 2016 for employers with 50 to 99 workers. The Treasury Decision 9655 modifies Proposed Regulations REG-138006-12.

== See also ==
- HealthCare.gov
- Health Care and Education Reconciliation Act of 2010
- Federal Data Services Hub
