= Authority for Mandate Delay Act =

Proposed United States law

- Long title: To delay the application of the employer health insurance mandate, and for other purposes.
- Announced in: the 113th United States Congress
- Sponsored by: Rep. Tim Griffin (R, AR-2)
- Number of co-sponsors: 23

Codification
- Acts affected: Patient Protection and Affordable Care Act

Legislative history
- Introduced in the House as H.R. 2667 by Rep. Tim Griffin (R, AR-2) on July 11, 2013; Committee consideration by United States House Committee on Ways and Means, Passed the House on July 17, 2013 (264-161)

The Authority for Mandate Delay Act (H.R. 2667) is a bill that would amend the Patient Protection and Affordable Care Act "to delay until 2015 enforcement of requirements that large employers offer their full-time employees the opportunity to enroll in minimum essential coverage." The bill was introduced into the United States House of Representatives during the 113th United States Congress.

On July 2, 2013, the Obama Administration announced that it would be delaying one of the key requirements of the Patient Protection and Affordable Care Act (commonly known as "Obamacare"). The requirement that all companies which employed more than 50 workers must offer an employee health insurance plan or pay a fine would now be delayed until 2015, according to the Administration. The announcement was made on the United States Department of the Treasury's website. In that statement, the Administration announced that they would be delaying implementation for a year in order to meet two goals: "First, it will allow us to consider ways to simplify the new reporting requirements consistent with the law. Second, it will provide time to adapt health coverage and reporting systems while employers are moving toward making health coverage affordable and accessible for their employees." Critics sarcastically noted that "despite nearly four years of lead time, (the Obama Administration) still won’t have the capacity to collect from employers the information required to determine which employers will be subject to penalties in 2014."

The announcement of the delay was met with criticism by some. House Majority Leader Eric Cantor argued that Congress would need to formally approve any delay. The Authority for Mandate Delay Act was introduced by Rep. Timothy Griffin (R-AR) on July 11, 2013, arguing that this would be required to authorize the delay. A second bill, the Fairness for American Families Act (H.R. 2668) was introduced on the same day by Rep. Todd Young (R-IN). The Fairness for American Families Act would apply the same delay to the individual health insurance mandate, an action which the Obama Administration had not planned on.

== Background ==
The Patient Protection and Affordable Care Act (PPACA), commonly called Obamacare or the Affordable Care Act (ACA), is a United States federal statute signed into law by President Barack Obama on March 23, 2010. Together with the Health Care and Education Reconciliation Act, it represents the most significant government expansion and regulatory overhaul of the U.S. healthcare system since the passage of Medicare and Medicaid in 1965.

In July 2013, a letter signed by the leaders of the Teamsters, UFCW, and UNITE-HERE stated, "the ACA will shatter not only our hard-earned health benefits, but destroy the foundation of the 40 hour work week that is the backbone of the American middle class... the law creates an incentive for employers to keep employees’ work hours below 30 hours a week... we can no longer stand silent in the face of elements of the Affordable Care Act that will destroy the very health and wellbeing of our members along with millions of other hardworking Americans..."

On June 28, 2012, the United States Supreme Court upheld the constitutionality of most of the ACA in the case National Federation of Independent Business v. Sebelius.

The law was championed by President Barack Obama and supported by most Democrats, but Republicans have tried numerous times to overturn the law. When the Obama Administration announced that it would be delaying the implementation of part of the Patient Protection and Affordable Care Act, it was seen as a new opportunity to fight against the bill, leading to the proposal of the Authority for Mandate Delay Act and the Fairness for American Families Act.

== Provisions of the bill ==
This summary is based largely on the summary provided by the Congressional Research Service, a public domain source.

The Authority for Mandate Delay Act would amend the Patient Protection and Affordable Care Act to delay until 2015 enforcement of requirements that large employers offer their full-time employees the opportunity to enroll in minimum essential coverage. The bill would also delay the effective date of related reporting requirements for such employers and for providers of minimum essential coverage.

== Procedural history ==
The Authority for Mandate Delay Act was introduced into the House on July 11, 2013, by Rep. Timothy Griffin (R-AR). It was referred to the United States House Committee on Ways and Means. The bill passed the House on July 17, 2013, by 264- 161 in Roll Call 361.

Although the bill was expected to pass in the House, it was not expected to ever receive a vote in the Democratic-controlled United States Senate.

== Debate and discussion ==
=== Legal standing of the Administration's decision ===
The Obama Administration's decision to delay the employer health insurance mandate was met with immediate criticism as an illegal action. The Patient Protection and Affordable Care Act states in several different places that the employer mandate begins in January 2014 – certain tax credits become available January 1, penalties are stated for 2014 (to be adjusted by inflation in the following years), and the section about the employer mandate has a specific effective date. There is a specific section granting the authority to waive certain requirements, but only under a set of exact conditions, only on a state level basis, and not beginning until 2017; this indicates that "Congress clearly did not want the administration to waive it unless certain specified conditions were met."

Legal scholar and former federal judge on the United States Court of Appeals for the Tenth Circuit, Michael W. McConnell, wrote in an op-ed in The Wall Street Journal that Obama's decision "raises grave concerns about his understanding of the role of the executive in our system of government." He noted that "Article II, Section 3, of the Constitution states that the president 'shall take Care that the Laws be faithfully executed.' This is a duty, not a discretionary power." McConnell argued that President Obama had blatantly exceeded the limits of executive power in this decision and provided other examples of his behavior doing so in the past.

Critics from both political parties shared similar opinions to McConnell, arguing that this decision was evidence President Obama was only selectively enforcing the laws passed by Congress. Democratic Senator Tom Harkin was skeptical on this subject, asking "this was the law. How can they change the law?"

=== Arguments in favor of the House bill ===
When he explained why he had introduced the bill, Rep. Griffin argued that, although he believed the Obama Administration's unilateral decision to delay the mandate was illegal, he still believed delaying the mandate was a good idea in order to save jobs and protect workers.

=== Political maneuvering ===
The New York Times (NYT) described Obama's decision to delay the employer mandate as a "self-inflicted wound" which Republicans saw as an opportunity. The NYT suggested that a Republican strategy might begin by having multiple votes – one on affirming/legalizing President Obama's decision to delay the employer mandate (which Democrats would back) and then one on delaying the individual mandate (which Democrats might now have difficulty voting against). The Obama Administration's response to the criticism about this issue was seen as not very strong; the Administration refused to send a representative to a hearing about the matter being held at the House of Representatives.

However, Constitutional scholar Simon Lazarus argued that such concerns about the legality of the administration's decisions were overblown and ahistorical: "In fact, applicable judicial precedent places such timing adjustments well within the Executive Branch's lawful discretion... Nor is the one-year delay of the employer mandate an affront to the Constitution, as Professor Michael McConnell and Congressional Republicans insist... Rather, the President has authorized a minor temporary course correction regarding individual ACA provisions, necessary in his Administration's judgment to faithfully execute the overall statute, other related laws, and the purposes of the ACA's framers. As a legal as well as a practical matter, that's well within his job description."

== See also ==
- List of bills in the 113th United States Congress
- Presidency of Barack Obama
- Patient Protection and Affordable Care Act
- Health insurance mandate
- Health insurance coverage in the United States
- Fairness for American Families Act (H.R. 2668; 113th Congress)
