= HealthSherpa =

Health Technology company

- HealthSherpa Logo
- Company type: Startup
- Industry: Healthcare Navigation
- Founded: 2013
- Founder: George Kalogeropoulos; Ning Liang; Catherine Perez
- Headquarters: San Francisco, California, U.S.
- Area served: U.S.
- Number of employees: 73 (Nov 2021)
- Website: HealthSherpa.com

HealthSherpa is a California-based technology company focused on connecting individuals with health coverage. The site was initially developed as an alternative to research plans from Healthcare.gov.

== History ==
HealthSherpa was founded by Ning Liang and George Kalogeropoulos, who participated together in the Silicon Valley startup accelerator Y-Combinator. Catherine Perez was named a late co-founder and Chief Product Officer (CPO) in 2015. In addition to Y-Combinator, the company is backed by Innovation Endeavors, Kapor Capital, and Group 11.

== Services ==
In 2020, the company had 3 core business units:

1. Consumer. Shopping, quoting, enrollment and application & coverage management directly available to consumers to enroll in Affordable Care Act / "Obamacare" plans. Unique among for-profit enrollment sites, HealthSherpa.com shows all plans available from all insurers on equal footing without consideration of commission payments, and only offers ACA-compliant on-exchange coverage. HealthSherpa also partners with employers to help their non-benefits eligible employees find health coverage.
2. Carriers. Enhanced Direct Enrollment platform leveraged by insurance issuers. As of 2019, 10 of 11 issuers approved for EDE used HealthSherpa's platform.
3. Agencies and Brokers. A free enrollment pathway with integrated quoting, enrollment and servicing. More than 36,000 agents and 4,800 agencies have adopted HealthSherpa’s free agency and broker platform.

As of October 2021, over 6 million people have been enrolled in individual health coverage through HealthSherpa.

== Integration with Healthcare.gov ==
On December 4, 2018, HealthSherpa announced that it was the first company approved to utilize the Department of Health and Human Services’ innovative new Enhanced Direct Enrollment (EDE) technology, which permits private companies to carry out all enrollment and related activities for on-exchange health coverage.
