= Student Aid and Fiscal Responsibility Act =

United States law

- Long title: Section 2, Division III of Health Care and Education Reconciliation Act.
- Acronyms (colloquial): SAFRA
- Enacted by: the 111th United States Congress

Citations
- Statutes at Large: 124 Stat. 1071

Codification
- Acts amended: Patient Protection and Affordable Care Act

Legislative history
- Introduced in the House by George Miller (D–CA); Passed the House on September 17, 2009 (253-171); Signed into law by President Barack Obama on March 30, 2010

The Student Aid and Fiscal Responsibility Act of 2009 (SAFRA; H.R. 3221) is a bill introduced in the U.S. House of Representatives of the 111th United States Congress by Congressman George Miller that would expand federal Pell Grants to a maximum of $5,500 in 2010 and tie increases in Pell Grant maximum values to annual increases in the Consumer Price Index plus 1%. It would also end the practice of federally subsidized private loans, using all federal student loan funding for Direct Loans and potentially cutting the federal deficit by $87 billion over 10 years. On September 17, 2009, the House approved the bill by a 253–171 margin.

On March 18, 2010, the text of this act was included as a rider on the Health Care and Education Reconciliation Act of 2010, signed into law on March 30, 2010, by President Obama as an amendment to the Patient Protection and Affordable Care Act.
