= HealthCare.gov =

Health insurance exchange website

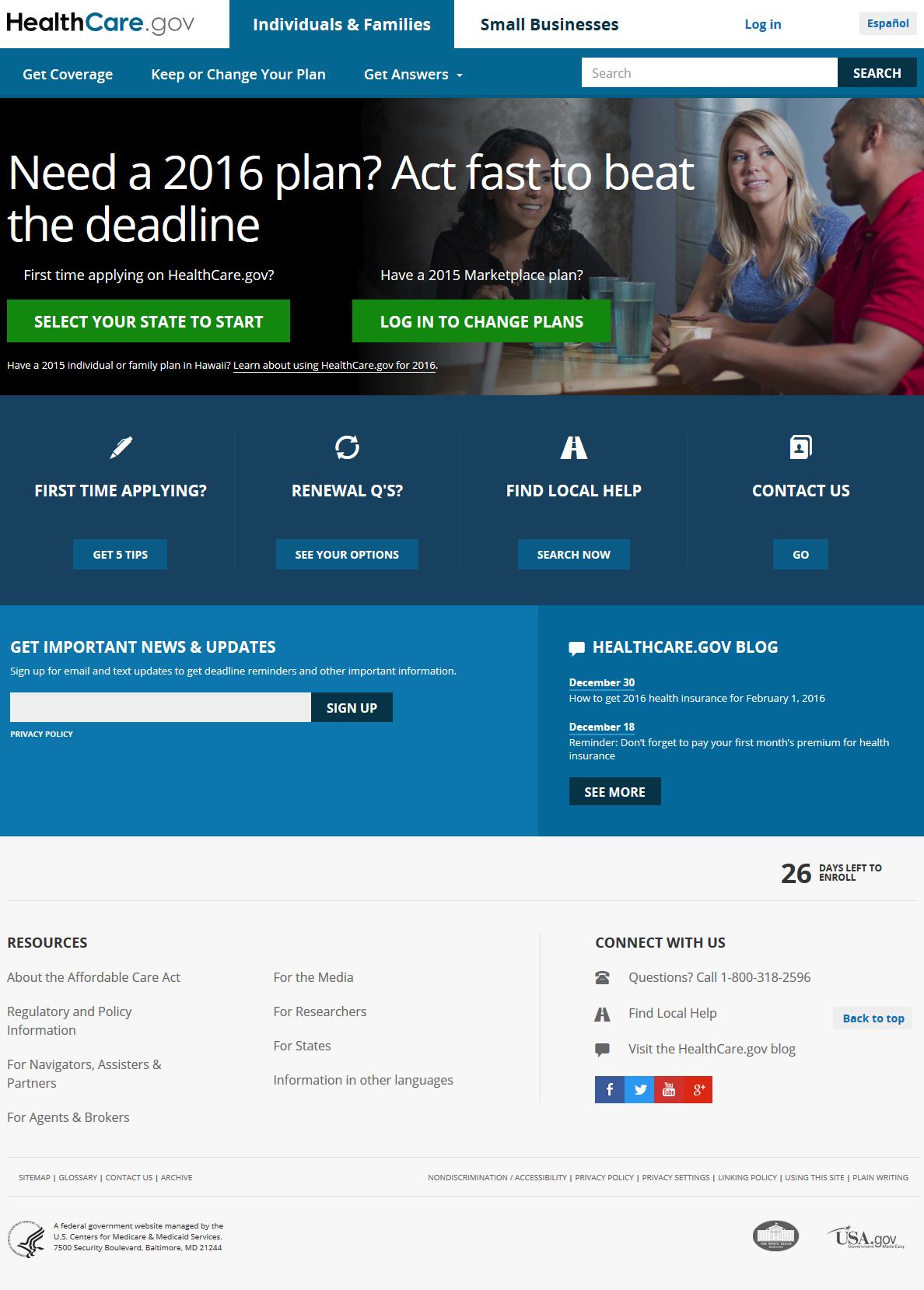
- Screenshot of HealthCare.gov Healthcare.gov as it appeared on January 5, 2016
- Website type: Health insurance marketplace
- Available in: English; Spanish
- Owner: U.S. Department of Health and Human Services
- Website: healthcare.gov (English) cuidadodesalud.gov (Spanish)
- Launched: October 1, 2013; 13 years ago
- Current status: Active

HealthCare.gov is a health insurance exchange website operated by the United States federal government under the provisions of the Affordable Care Act (ACA), informally referred to as "Obamacare", which currently serves the residents of the U.S. states which have opted not to create their own state exchanges. The exchange facilitates the sale of private health insurance plans to residents of the United States and offers subsidies to those who earn between one and four times the federal poverty line, but not to those earning less than the federal poverty line. The website also assists those persons who are eligible to sign up for Medicaid, and has a separate marketplace for small businesses.

On October 1, 2013, HealthCare.gov was rolled out as planned, despite the concurrent partial government shutdown. The launch was marred by serious technological problems, making it difficult for the public to sign up for health insurance. The deadline to sign up for coverage that would begin January 1, 2014, was December 23, 2013, by which time the problems had largely been fixed. The open enrollment period for 2016 coverage ran from November 1, 2015, to January 31, 2016. State exchanges also have had the same deadlines; their performance has been varied.

The design of the website was overseen by the Centers for Medicare and Medicaid Services and built by a number of federal contractors, most prominently CGI Inc. of Canada. The original budget for CGI was $93.7 million, but this grew to $292 million prior to launch of the website. While estimates that the overall cost for building the website had reached over $500 million prior to launch and in early 2014 HHS secretary Sylvia Mathews Burwell said there would be "approximately $834 million on Marketplace-related IT contracts and interagency agreements," the Office of Inspector General released a report in August 2014 finding that the total cost of the HealthCare.gov website had reached $1.7 billion and a month later, including costs beyond "computer systems," Bloomberg News estimated it at $2.1 billion. On July 30, 2014, the Government Accountability Office released a non-partisan study that concluded the administration did not provide "effective planning or oversight practices" in developing the HealthCare.gov website.

== Background and functionality ==
ACA Medicaid expansion by state. Not adopted Adopted Implemented

The site functions as a clearing house to allow Americans to compare prices on health insurance plans in their states, to begin enrollment in a chosen plan, and to simultaneously find out if they qualify for government healthcare subsidies. Visitors sign up and create their own specific user account first, listing some personal information, before receiving detailed information about what is available in their area. Designed to assist the millions of uninsured Americans, the comparison shopping features involve a visual format somewhat analogous to websites such as Amazon.com and Etsy.

HealthCare.gov also details Medicaid options for individuals. This relates to an expansion of the long-running program undertaken as a joint effort under the ACA. The Congressional Budget Office (CBO) projected that the exchange would be used by an estimated seven million Americans to obtain coverage during the first year after its launch; current estimates suggest that the combined figure is slightly above eight million.

== Development and history ==
President Barack Obama signed the Affordable Care Act (ACA) into law on March 23, 2010, in the East Room before a select audience of nearly 300 people. He stated that the health reform effort, designed after a long and acrimonious debate facing fierce opposition in the Congress to expand health insurance coverage, was based on "the core principle that everybody should have some basic security when it comes to their health care". The primary purpose of the ACA was to increase coverage to the American people either through public or private insurance and control healthcare costs. The Congressional Budget Office (CBO) estimated that the ACA would reduce the number of uninsured by 32 million, increasing coverage for the non-elderly citizens from 83 to 94 percent. Insurers were not allowed to deny insurance to applicants with pre-existing conditions. The Sunlight Foundation has stated that at least forty-seven private company contractors have been involved with the ACA in some capacity as of fall 2013, with the measure causing a wide variety of policy changes. Journalists writing for The New York Times have called the ACA "the most expansive social legislation enacted in decades".

A report by Reuters described HealthCare.gov itself as the "key" to the reform measure. Development of the website's interface as well as its supporting back-end services, to make sure that the website could work to help people compare between health insurance plans, were both outsourced to private companies. The front-end of the website was developed by the startup Development Seed. The back-end work was contracted out to CGI Federal Inc., a subsidiary of the Canadian IT Multinational corporation CGI Group, which subcontracted the work to other companies, as is common on large government contracts. CGI was also responsible for building some of the state-level healthcare exchanges, with varying levels of success (some did not open on schedule).

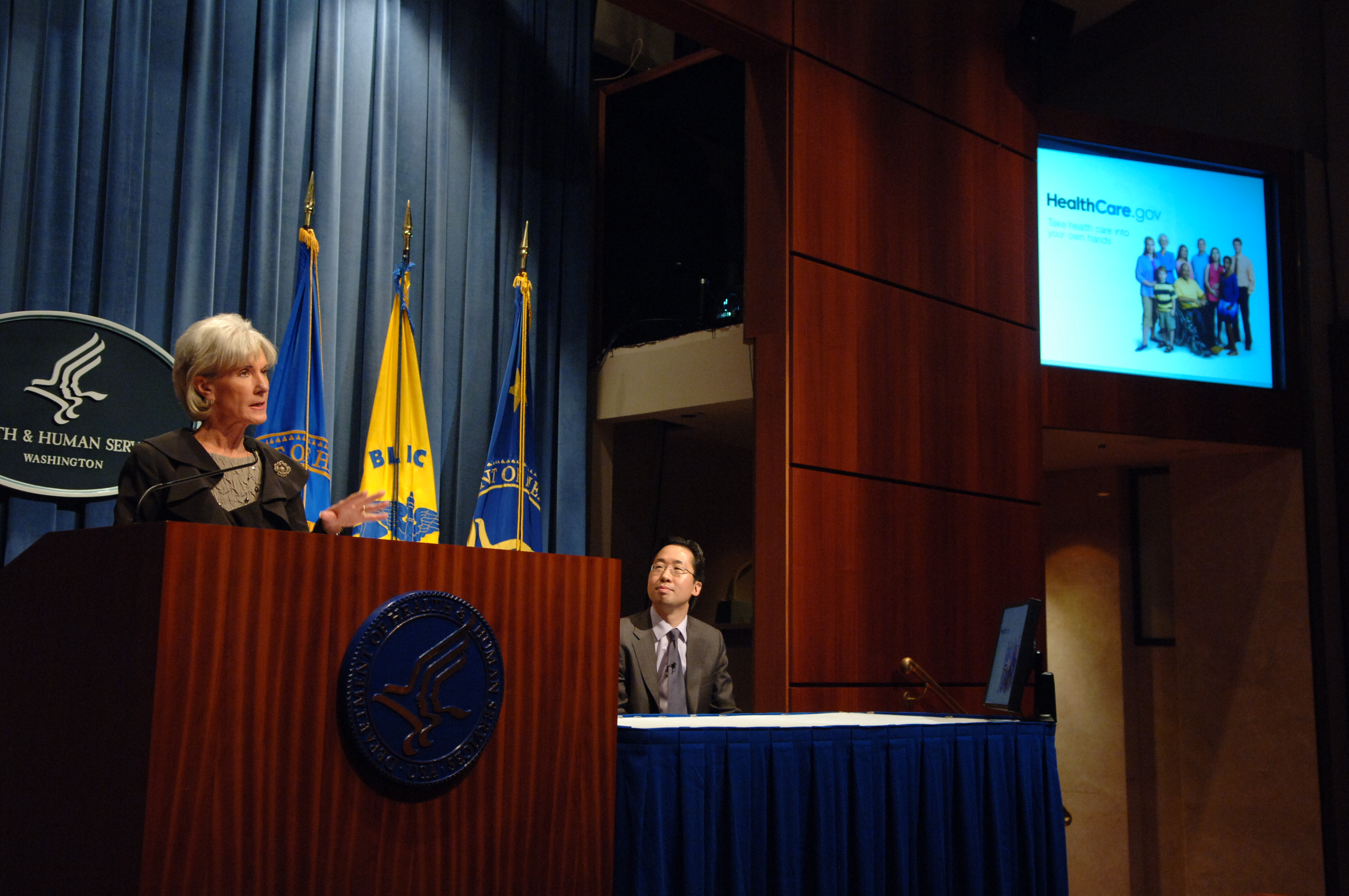
Kathleen Sebelius and Todd Park, chief technology officer of the Department of Health

According to author and journalist John J. Xenakis, CGI Federal's attempt in Massachusetts is characterized as a complete failure. In Xenakis' view, despite the Massachusetts connector being the type of website which a small team of five to ten could create in a few months on a 10 million dollar budget, a team of around 300 with a 200 million dollar budget failed. Xenakis claims CGI Federal were likely to have hired many incompetent programmers due to Massachusetts transferring the development contract to another firm, Optum. The software created by CGI was of poor quality and unusable by Optum, who had to start from scratch. CGI has also been accused of committing fraudulent tests and reports to those in charge of oversight. Similar problems occurred in many other states.

Specifically, aspects of HealthCare.gov relating to digital identity authentication were assigned to Experian. Quality Software Services, Inc. (QSSI) also played a role. The total number of companies enlisted in the website's creation, and their names, has not been disclosed by the Department of Health and Human Services. The whole effort was officially coordinated by the Centers for Medicare and Medicaid Services (CMS), an agency that commentators such as journalists David Perera and Sean Gallagher have speculated was ill-suited to that task. Social activist and technologist Clay Johnson later said that the federal government had issues come up given that it "leans towards a write-down-all-the-requirements-then-build-to-those-requirements type of methodology" not well suited to current IT especially when government contractors are focused on maximizing profits.

"The firms that typically get contracts are the firms that are good at getting contracts, not typically good at executing on them," Alex Howard, a fellow at the Harvard Ash Center for Democratic Governance and Innovation, remarked to The Verge as he evaluated the back-end of the project. In contrast, the web-magazine's journalist Adrianne Jeffries praised the successful use of an "innovative" startup business for the front-end. However, she found the overall rollout "bone-headed".

The Obama administration repeatedly modified regulations and policies until summer 2013, meaning contractors had to deal with changing requirements. However, changing requirements are by no means unusual in a large, expensive custom software project; they are a well-known factor in historical project failures, and methodologies such as agile software development have been developed to cope with them. Unfortunately, regulations pertaining to large government contracts in many countries, including the United States, are not a good match for agile software development.

== Statistics ==
Analysis by the Reuters news agency in mid-October stated that the total contract-based cost of building HealthCare.gov swelled threefold from its initial estimate of $93.7 million to about $292 million. In August 2014, the Office of Inspector General released a report finding that the cost of the HealthCare.gov website had reached $1.7 billion. As pointed out later by commentators such as Mark Steyn, the CGI company had already been embroiled in a mid-2000s controversy before over contract payments. While devising the Canadian Firearms Registry, estimated costs of $2 million ballooned to about $2 billion.

On March 25, 2019, the Centers for Medicare and Medicaid Services reported that 11.4 million Americans had selected enrolled in or automatically renewed their Exchange coverage during the 2019 Open Enrollment Period.

== Concerns about the website ==
=== Issues during launch ===
Health insurance exchange functionality by state: Creating state-operated exchanges Establishing state-federal partnership exchanges Defaulting to federal exchange

The HealthCare.gov website was launched on the scheduled date of October 1, 2013. Although the government shutdown began on the same day, HealthCare.gov was one of the federal government websites that remained open through the events. Although it appeared to be up and running normally, visitors quickly encountered numerous types of technical problems, and, by some estimates, only 1% of interested people were able to enroll to the site in the first week of its operations. Even for those that did manage to enroll, insurance providers later reported some instances of applications submitted through the site with required information missing.

In Bloomberg Businessweek journalist Paul Ford summed up the issue by remarking, "Regardless of your opinions on the health-care law, this is the wrong way to make software." He also wrote, "In the meantime, it's clear that tens of millions of dollars have been spent to launch something broken." A ConsumerReports.org article re-iterated previous advice, with the group recommending for people to stay "away from HealthCare.gov for at least another month". The group stated as well, "Hopefully that will be long enough for its software vendors to clean up the mess they've made."

In its third week of operations, technical problems continued. A CNN.com article highlighted the "maddeningly long wait times" as an issue. A variety of other problems included broken pull-down menus that have only worked intermittently, for example.

Todd Park, the U.S. chief technology officer, initially said on October 6 that the glitches were caused by unexpected high volume when the site drew 250,000 simultaneous users instead of the 50,000-60,000 expected. He claimed that the site would have worked with fewer simultaneous users. More than 8.1 million people visited the site from October 1 to 4. White House officials subsequently conceded that it was not just an issue of volume, but involved software and systems design issues. For example, consumers are required to create an account before being able to compare plans, and the registration process may have created a bottleneck that led to the long wait times. Also, stress tests done by contractors 1 day before the launch date revealed that the site became too slow with only 1,100 simultaneous users, nowhere near even the 50,000-60,000 expected.

Despite later comments, concerns about the readiness of the exchanges had been raised in March 2013, by Henry Chao, the deputy chief information officer at the Centers for Medicare and Medicaid Services (CMS), who had said that "let's just make sure it's not a third-world experience". A colleague of his, Gary Cohen, had also remarked, "Everyone recognizes that day one will not be perfect." Even by 2011, when the CMS awarded its private sector contracts, most of the ACA regulations and implementation measures were still in flux.

The New York Times and The Washington Post reported in November 2013 that the Obama administration brought in consulting firm McKinsey & Company to assess the website. Their report, delivered in March 2013, warned that the effort to build the HealthCare.gov site was falling behind and was at risk of failure unless immediate steps were taken to correct the problems.

On October 21, 2013, President Barack Obama addressed the technical problems and other issues in a thirty-minute press conference at the White House Rose Garden, saying that there was "no excuse" for them. He remarked, "There's no sugar coating: the website has been too slow, people have been getting stuck during the application process and I think it's fair to say that nobody's more frustrated by that than I am." He also stated that a "tech surge" was underway to fix the problems. The President additionally pointed out that people could instead apply through a call center or in person.

White House Press Secretary Jay Carney said more time was needed to get the website working properly. Carney also hinted that if the problems remained unresolved for such a long time that it prevented people from meeting their legal obligation to obtain insurance in time for the February deadline, the legal penalty for not obtaining insurance would not be applicable because the Obamacare law states that if affordable care is not available, the penalty will not be payable.

So, shortly after HealthCare.gov's launch, the problems still did not affect the legal requirement for Americans to have health insurance by December 15, which remained on the books as stated. However, on October 23, the effective legal deadline for applying for health insurance via HealthCare.gov without getting a penalty via the individual mandate was extended to March 31, 2014, possibly because of the problems with HealthCare.gov and some of the state healthcare exchanges (but without a de jure explanation as such given).

The Obama administration appointed a contractor, Quality Software Services, Inc (QSSI), to coordinate the work of the fixing of the website problems. The company had already worked on the website's back-end before the website went live. As stated before, prior to the launch, the Centers for Medicare and Medicaid Services (CMS) had been playing the role of coordinator, but critics charged that it was ill-suited for such a systems integration role. The administration appointed Jeffrey Zients to act as their adviser in the matter.

On October 25, Zients promised, in a conference call to the media, that the site would be working well "for the vast majority of users" by the end of November. He also claimed that 90% of visitors are now able to complete the account-creation process and actually used HealthCare.gov to compare plans. Perhaps the largest issue he faces, as he acknowledged in the call, are the error-riddled reports given to insurers, often messing up basic details such as an individual's gender.

As stated before, HealthCare.gov problems have persisted even weeks after the launch. For example, a networking failure error at the related data services hub killed the website's functionality again October 28. This occurred the exact day after Health and Human Services head Kathleen Sebelius had highlighted the design of that data hub as a government success. However, state-based exchanges have mostly worked well in registering individuals during this time period, with CNN.com describing them as "largely error free".

A large number of technical fixes took place through October and November, with an NPR.org report later remarking that the website seemed to be "working more smoothly." Yet, on November 13, the Obama administration revealed that fewer than 27,000 people had signed up to private health insurance through the site. By November 30, more than 137,000 people had obtained health insurance through the federal website. That figure represented a strong increase, but enrollment figures were still vastly below past U.S. government forecasts.

Accenture was chosen to replace CGI Group as the lead contractor for the website in January 2014.

A large issue with future enrollments is dealing with the accuracy of HealthCare.gov information sent to insurance companies. As stated in an NPR.org article citing "continuing problems" with HealthCare.gov, about one in ten enrollment notices have contained a significant error.

=== 2015 open enrollment period ===
Enrollment for the 2015 year through the federal government website, which serves 37 states with no enrollment websites, started at midnight of Nov 15, 2014, and ended on February 15, 2015.

The United States Department of Health and Human Services reported a relatively smooth experience for users. However, scattered reports of problems, such as blocking login access and long wait times, were encountered. In one case, a call center worker told a reporter that resolving their issue may take five to seven business days.

In January, USA Today reported that more health plans were offered in about 75% of counties for 2015, and while average insurance premium increased less than the average 10% annual jumps for plans before the Affordable Care Act, there were still some very large increases.

State and federal health care exchanges have enrolled more than 9.5 million people, but the numbers vary. Florida accounted for almost a seventh of all people who have selected plans on the exchanges. Texas, however, has the largest share of uninsured adults while enrollments lag.

=== 2016 open enrollment period ===
The open enrollment period for 2016 began on November 1, 2015, and ended on January 31, 2016.

=== Fake websites ===
Before HealthCare.gov went online, there was concern about misleading or fake websites at the state or local level. In early December 2013, a third fake health insurance site was shut down in Kentucky. California Democratic Party politicians condemned a California Republican Party-created website which resembled the state's official Obamacare sign-up website but provided political criticisms of the law instead of insurance coverage.

=== Privately-operated exchanges ===
Partly in response to the Healthcare.gov outages, a number of privately operated services have launched to provide tools for consumers to calculate subsidy eligibility, as well as research, compare, and enroll for plans examples include HealthSherpa, Stride Health and HealthPocket. In November 2013, HealthSherpa was launched by a team of coders in San Francisco and received media attention for its comparative ease of use. Critics pointed out that by focusing only on providing information, the HealthSherpa site did not resolve some of the most difficult problems, including allowing consumers to actually enroll in a plan. Stride Health launched in 2014, and focused on simplifying health care enrollment by recommending plans to its users based on their data and offering a full service team on the phone who can help its users enroll in plans. The company saw early success through partnerships with a number of large companies. By March 2014, HealthSherpa had become a full-service broker allowing users to enroll directly on the HealthSherpa site.

=== Security ===
In July 2014, a hacker broke into a test server for HealthCare.gov and uploaded malicious software. By the end of 2014, HealthCare.gov had apparently rewritten a large portion of the site and moved important functions "server-side," instead of being executed client-side in the user's web browser.

==== Data privacy ====
The initial launch of HealthCare.gov was plagued with security concerns and led to information security experts publicly testifying before the Congressional Committee on Science, Space and Technology and others speaking to the government about security vulnerabilities in HealthCare.gov. David Kennedy was able to locate 70,000 health records that were supposed to be private but were publicly available via a google dork.

There are concerns that personal information put into the website may not be secure in the way that users expect: on January 24, 2015 Kevin Counihan, the C.E.O. of Healthcare.gov, addressed concerns about privacy on the federal website. He said they launched a review of their privacy policies, contracts for third-party tools, and URL construction. He said that Healthcare.gov had encrypted a URL that contained data on users' income, age, and whether they were pregnant.

On Jan. 20, 2015, the Associated Press reported in an article titled: "Government health care website quietly sharing personal data" that HealthCare.gov is providing access to enrollees' personal data to private companies that specialize in advertising. The data may include age, income, ZIP code, whether a person smokes, and if a person is pregnant. It may also include a computer's Internet address, which can identify a person's name or address when combined with other information collected by data brokers and online advertising firms.

There is no evidence that this data has been misused, but connections to dozens of third-party tech firms were documented. Some of these companies were also collecting highly specific information.

=== Copyright infringement ===
In October 2013, The Weekly Standard reported the site was violating the copyrights of SpryMedia, a UK-based technology company, by utilizing their software with the copyright notices removed. The software was DataTables, a free and open-source plugin for jQuery designed to improve presentation of data, and was dual-licensed under the GNU GPL version 2 and a modified 3-clause BSD license. HealthCare.gov subsequently rectified the license violation by providing appropriate attribution, license and copyright notices.

== Reception and possible ramifications ==
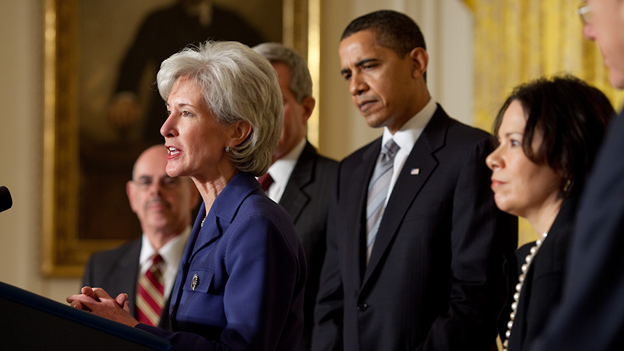
Kathleen Sebelius formally accepts her nomination as Secretary with President Obama by her side.

The technical problems were heavily criticized, and Republican representatives sent President Obama a list of questions, demanding explanations for what went wrong. Some Republicans called for the Secretary of Health and Human Services, Kathleen Sebelius, to be fired, because she oversaw the planning for the site launch. Former White House Press Secretary Robert Gibbs described the technical problems as "excruciatingly embarrassing", and he said that some people should be fired. Scott Amey of the Project on Government Oversight pointed to the development cost ceiling being raised from $93.7 million to $292 million, and he asked: "Where was the contract oversight?"

American conservative commentators such as National Review writers Jonah Goldberg and Mark Steyn have argued that the website's launch was a disaster that presages larger problems throughout the entire law, with Goldberg asserting that "the Republicans who insisted that this monstrosity had to be delayed are looking just a little bit more reasonable with every passing tick." In a statement, the Republican National Committee (RNC) responded to President Obama's comments that the "tech surge" was code for a "spending surge" and will waste millions of dollars. Said statement also read, "The federal bureaucracy has proven itself too slow, too bloated, too incompetent, and too outdated to manage America's health care."

Speaker of the House John Boehner, a Republican Representative from Ohio, told reporters that throughout November "more Americans are going to lose their health care than are going to sign up." Ohio Governor John Kasich stated on NBC's Meet the Press program on October 27 that the roll-out has "got everybody just shaking their heads". He also added that it seemed highly likely that most Ohioans would pay more on the HealthCare.gov plans. Kentucky Governor Steve Beshear counter-argued that while the website didn't work well yet that it soon would since HealthCare.gov represents "the future of health care", and he commented as well, "You know, the advice I would give the news media and the critics up here is take a deep breath."

The Daily Show host Jon Stewart notably lampooned the HealthCare.gov controversy during an interview with Sebelius. He jokingly challenged her to an online race: "I'm going to try and download every movie ever made, and you're going to try to sign up for Obamacare, and we'll see which happens first." She also faced grilling over the Obama administration's opposition to an extended individual mandate delay.

Sebelius later said in response to criticism, "The majority of people calling for me to resign I would say are people who I don't work for and who do not want this program to work in the first place". She also said, "I have had frequent conversations with the President and I have committed to him that my role is to get the program up and running, and we will do just that." Her popularity in her native Kansas where she previously served as governor, according to University of Kansas political science professor Burdett Loomis, has spurred her on to stay on.

U.S. House Minority Leader Nancy Pelosi, a Democratic Representative from California, commented about the controversy that she feels optimistic about things being fixed, saying "I have faith in technology" as well as "while there are glitches, there are solutions, as well." Democrats in Congress have accused Republican critics of HealthCare.gov of acting in bad faith. "We want the process to improve, but we're not interested in torpedoing the process," said Representative Xavier Becerra, another Democrat from California and chairman of the House Democratic Caucus.

Republican Senator Marco Rubio has drafted legislation as a result of the controversy to delay the individual mandate. The proposed legislation has drawn scattered Democratic support. Professor and author Victor Lombardi commented to Bloomberg Businessweek that the website's issues "don't sound catastrophic", and he added that history "may judge this project as the catalyst that revolutionized the United States health-care system" such that "no one will remember a few hiccups at launch."

Although the law that decreed the creation of HealthCare.gov has been divisive and political speculation has taken place, polling done by the Gallup organization around the time of the difficult roll-out still have found that a majority of Americans support keeping at least some aspects of Obamacare. Specifically, just 29% of the public favoured a complete repeal. However, a joint The Washington Post and ABC News survey stated that 56% of respondents consider the website's problems a harbinger of other problems with the health care measure.

On October 29, 2013, Rep. Lee Terry (R, NE-2) introduced the Exchange Information Disclosure Act. The bill would require the United States Department of Health and Human Services to submit weekly reports to Congress about the how many people are using HealthCare.gov and signing up for health insurance. These reports would be due every Monday until March 31, 2015, and would be available to the public. The bill would "require weekly updates on the number of unique website visitors, new accounts, and new enrollments in a qualified health plan, as well as the level of coverage," separating the data by state. The bill would also require reports on efforts to fix the broken portions of the website. The House was scheduled to vote on it on January 10, 2014.

Kathleen Sebelius resigned as Secretary of Health and Human Services on April 10, 2014. She was replaced by Sylvia Mathews Burwell on June 9.

== See also ==
- Centers for Medicare and Medicaid Services
- eHealthInsurance
- Health care in the United States
- Health care reform in the United States
- Health care reforms proposed during the Obama administration
- Health insurance coverage in the United States
- Health insurance marketplace
- List of failed and overbudget custom software projects
- The Mythical Man-Month
- Provisions of the Patient Protection and Affordable Care Act
- United States Department of Health and Human Services
