= Quality Software Services =

American software company

Quality Software Services, Inc. (QSSI) is an American software services company and a subsidiary of the UnitedHealth Group. QSSI specializes in providing management of information technology applications to federal and state governments, as well as commercial and healthcare organizations.

In 2013, it was chosen by the Department of Health and Human Services as one of the contractors to oversee repair the Obama Administration's website of Healthcare Marketplaces.

QSSI was founded in 1997 by Tony Singh and is based in Columbia, Maryland. It was acquired by the UnitedHealth Group in 2012.
