= Health Insurance Innovations =

- Type: Public
- Traded as: Nasdaq: BFYT (Class A); Russell 2000 Component
- Industry: health insurance
- Genre: Insurtech
- Founded: 2008; 18 years ago
- Headquarters: Tampa, Florida, United States
- Number of locations: 4
- Key people: Gavin Southwell (CEO and president)
- Services: short term health insurance and related products
- Website: hiiq.com

Health Insurance Innovations (HII) is a product agnostic insurance technology platform. The firm has headquarters in Tampa, Florida and is listed on NASDAQ. The company uses a cloud-based platform for licensed independent agents to enroll customers in products provided by insurance companies which provide the actual coverage. The firm also provides billing and information services for both the clients and the agents.

== Coverage ==
The firm provides access to a variety of coverage options, including Short-term health insurance, limited medical coverage, medical discount memberships, accident, cancer and critical illness coverage, prescription savings programs, dental and vision coverage, life insurance, AD&D coverage, health and wellness programs, and lifestyle discounts. These products and not comprehensive health insurance. They do not provide benefits that satisfy the minimum essential coverage requirements under the Affordable Care Act. Despite these limitations, telemarketers who sell HII products have been frequently accused of misleading consumers into believing that HII plans are as good as or even better than "Obamacare" health insurance. In a 2017 interview with the Capitol Forum, CEO Gavin Southwell dismissed the suggestion that HII is responsible for the conduct of its call centers, stating: "They’re privately-owned, so they kind of are what they are.”

== History ==
The company was initially run by Health Plan Intermediaries, LLC., which was owned by Naylor Group Partners, LLC. In 2011, Health Insurance Innovations agreed to purchase the units of Health Plan Intermediaries, LLC. As of September 30, 2012, the company had 51 employees.

In March 2015, Michael Hershberger, senior vice president of finance and business development, was named the interim chief financial officer, principal financial officer, and principal accounting officer. Gavin Southwell was named CEO and president in 2016.

In 2018, Fortune listed Health Insurance Innovations as #1 of the Top 100 Fastest Growing Companies. In 2019, projected growth of the short-term medical insurance market and "healthcare policy changes of the present and future", such as the repealed Individual Mandate Penalty and future changes to State subsidies for Medicaid, were factored into an analysis of the firm by SeekingAlpha.

== Ratings and reviews ==
HII currently has a D− rating with the Better Business Bureau due, in part, to the company's failure "to resolve underlying cause(s) of a pattern of complaints." In the past three years, consumers have filed 295 complaints with the BBB against HII.

== Acquisitions ==
In 2014, the company acquired HealthPocket Inc. for $32M, a free website for consumers to compare health insurance plans online. It includes a variety of health insurance resources such as statistics, polls, and research. In 2016, RAND Corporation included HealthPocket in their consumer healthcare decision-making research report for policymakers, industry experts, and researchers interested in web design and consumer choice. In 2018, both HealthPocket founders made a planned transition and are no longer with the company.

In 2015, Health Insurance Innovations announced the acquisition of Agile Health Insurance (or AgileHealthInsurance), which sells short-term health insurance alternatives to Affordable Care Act insurance (“ACA” or Obamacare). Agile's website details prices for various private health insurance plans and allows consumers to apply for coverage online. The company is headquartered in Mountain View, CA and the current SVP and Head of Business Operations is Shaun Greene.

In 2019, Health Insurance Innovations announced the acquisition of TogetherHealth (or TogetherHealth, LLC), which is a direct-to-consumer platform that connects individuals with insurance carriers through consumer acquisition and engagement.

== Legal actions ==
In December, 2018, the firm reached a settlement that resulted in no fines, penalties, or findings of wrongdoing with regulators in 43 states over its marketing practices.

In June, 2019, two lawsuits were filed in the Federal Court alleging that the firm had misled them in the sale of insurance. The policies were issued through Simple Health, a company closed by Federal regulators in November 2018 and terminated by HII at the same time; the lawsuit alleges that Simple Health had in fact been funded by HII despite the scrutiny received by the company from insurance departments in 43 states and the FTC. Without evidence, HII has stated that the "[t]he FTC and the DOI investigators recognized that HII was not the party responsible for the actions of Simple Health," implying that the company is not under scrutiny by regulators. The FTC has not issued any public statement clearing HII of responsibility for the fraudulent sales practices engaged in by Simple Health, nor has the agency confirmed whether or not HII is under investigation for these practices. HII has been the subject of an ongoing regulatory inquiry conducted by the Massachusetts Attorney General's office since at least June 2016. This investigation concerns "“the unlawful marketing and sale in Massachusetts of health insurance and discount health plans" by HII as well as its distributors, including National Brokers of America, an F-rated broker that has been the target of numerous regulatory actions.
