= Tim Griffin =

American lawyer & politician (born 1968)

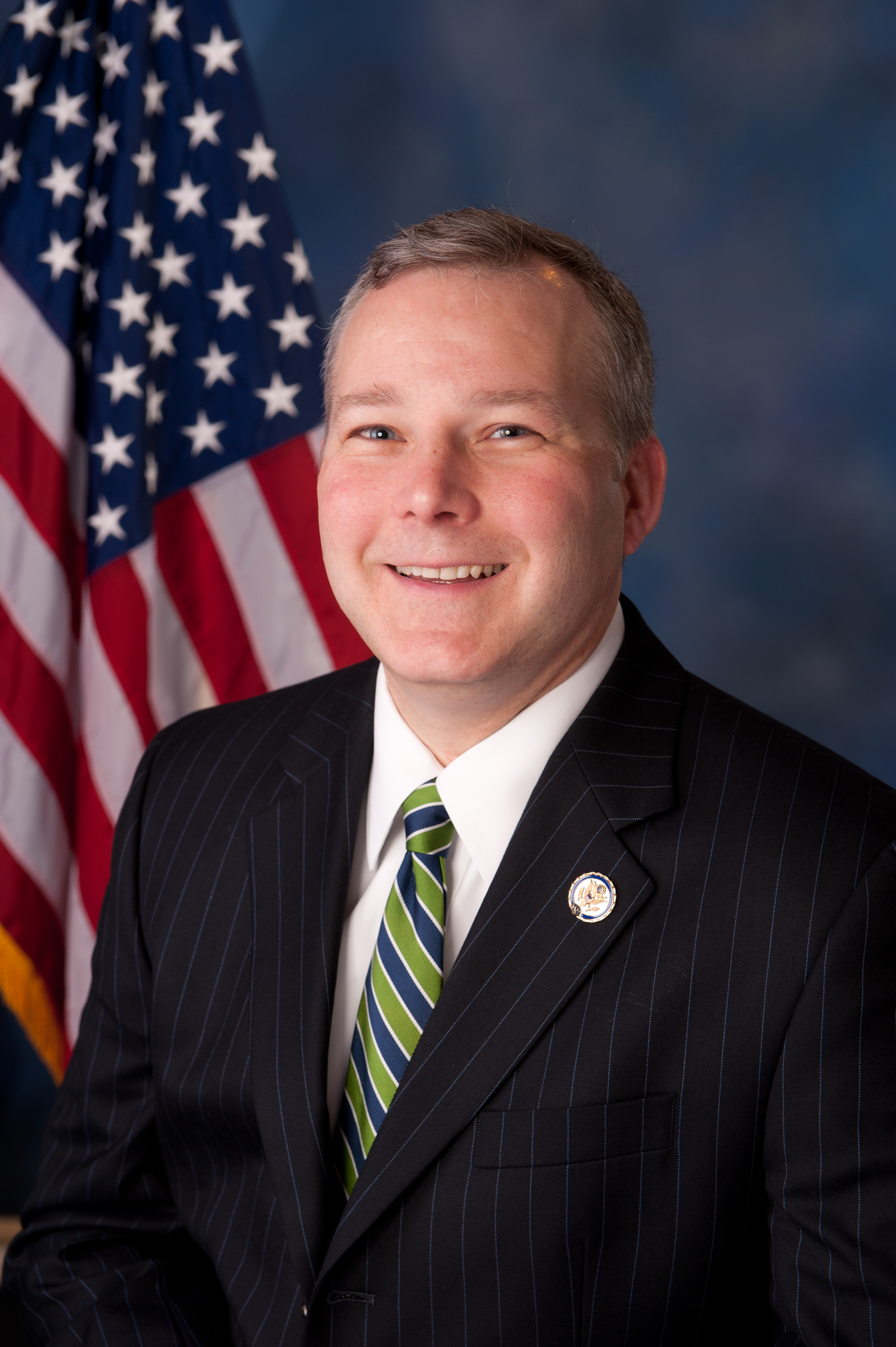
- Official portrait, 2011

57th Attorney General of Arkansas
- Incumbent
- Assumed office January 10, 2023
- Governor: Sarah Huckabee Sanders
- Preceded by: Leslie Rutledge

20th Lieutenant Governor of Arkansas
- In office January 13, 2015 – January 10, 2023
- Governor: Asa Hutchinson
- Preceded by: Mark Darr
- Succeeded by: Leslie Rutledge

Member of the U.S. House of Representatives from Arkansas's 2nd district
- In office January 3, 2011 – January 3, 2015
- Preceded by: Vic Snyder
- Succeeded by: French Hill

United States Attorney for the Eastern District of Arkansas
- In office December 20, 2006 – June 1, 2007
- President: George W. Bush
- Preceded by: Bud Cummins
- Succeeded by: Jane Duke

Personal details
- Born: John Timothy Griffin; August 21, 1968 (age 58) Charlotte, North Carolina, U.S.
- Party: Republican
- Spouse: Elizabeth Griffin
- Children: 3
- Education: Hendrix College (BA); Pembroke College, Oxford (attended); Tulane University (JD); United States Army War College (MSS)

Military service
- Allegiance: United States
- Branch: United States Army
- Service years: 1996–present (reserve)
- Rank: Colonel
- Unit: 172d Stryker Brigade Combat Team, 101st Airborne Division (May–August 2006)
- Conflict: Iraq War
- Awards: Meritorious Service Medal; Army Commendation Medal (6); Army Achievement Medal (5); Army Meritorious Unit Commendation; Combat Action Badge
- Griffin's voice Griffin on the Authority for Mandate Delay Act. Recorded July 17, 2013

John Timothy Griffin (born August 21, 1968) is an American lawyer and politician serving as the 57th attorney general of Arkansas. He served as the 20th lieutenant governor of Arkansas from 2015 to 2023. A member of the Republican Party, he previously was the United States Attorney for the Eastern District of Arkansas between 2006 and 2007 and U.S. Representative for Arkansas's 2nd congressional district from 2011 to 2015.

Griffin defeated Democrat John Burkhalter for lieutenant governor in 2014 and served under Governor Asa Hutchinson. In summer 2020, Griffin announced his candidacy for the 2022 Arkansas gubernatorial election but withdrew from the race in February 2021, then launching a successful run for Arkansas Attorney General.

== Early life and education ==
Griffin was born in Charlotte, North Carolina, and reared in Magnolia in Columbia County in southern Arkansas. He graduated from Hendrix College, attended Pembroke College, Oxford, and earned his Juris Doctor degree from Tulane Law School.

== Early political career ==
=== Prior to 2004 ===
Griffin worked from September 1995 to January 1997 with Special Prosecutor David Barrett in the investigation of former Secretary of Housing and Urban Development, Henry Cisneros. For two years after that, he was the Senior Investigative Counsel for the House Committee on Government Reform.

In September 1999, he became Deputy Research Director for the Republican National Committee (for George W. Bush's election campaign); while in that position, he was a legal advisor for the "Bush-Cheney 2000 Florida Recount Team" (see Bush v. Gore). From March 2001 through June 2002, he was a special assistant to the Assistant Attorney General Michael Chertoff.

=== 2004 presidential election ===
From June 2002 to December 2004, Griffin was Research Director and Deputy Communications Director for Bush's 2004 reelection campaign, a high-ranking position within the RNC.

In June 2007, Senators Edward Kennedy of Massachusetts and Sheldon Whitehouse of Rhode Island asked the U.S. Justice Department to investigate whether Griffin led an RNC effort to suppress the African-American vote in Jacksonville, Florida, through caging during the 2004 election. Griffin called the allegations of voter suppression "absolutely, positively false," and there was no finding of any wrongdoing.

=== White House (2005–2006) ===
In April 2005, Griffin began working in the George W. Bush administration as Karl Rove's aide, with the title of Special Assistant to the President and Deputy Director in the Office of Political Affairs.

=== U.S. Attorney (2006–2007) ===
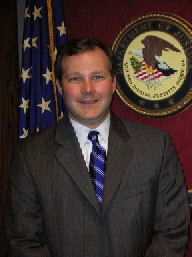
U.S. Attorney Tim Griffin

In September 2006, after ending a one-year military mobilization assignment, Griffin began working as a special assistant to U.S. Attorney Bud Cummins in the Eastern District of Arkansas.

On December 15, 2006, the Justice Department announced that Griffin would be appointed interim U.S. Attorney for the Eastern District of Arkansas, effective December 20, 2006, the date when the resignation of Cummins took effect.

Before a March 2006 revision to the Patriot Act, interim U.S. Attorneys had a 120-day term limit, pending confirmation by the Senate of a presidential nominee. The Attorney General makes interim appointments; after the revision, the Attorney General's interim appointees had no term limit, effectively bypassing the Senate confirmation process if the President declined to put forward a nomination. Griffin was among the first group of interim attorneys appointed by the Attorney General without a term limit. Gonzales's decision to bypass confirmation for Griffin particularly angered Arkansas's then Democratic senators, Blanche Lincoln and Mark Pryor, who both stated that Gonzales promised them Griffin would go before the Senate for confirmation. Gonzales's decision not to do so prompted Lincoln and Pryor to join many of their Democratic colleagues in demanding Gonzales's resignation or firing.

On May 30, 2007, Griffin resigned from his position effective June 1, 2007, with a tearful speech declaring that public service "not worth it. I'm married now and have a kid. I'm sorry I put my wife through this and I'm trying to move on."

Documents released by a subsequent congressional investigation showed that, in the summer of 2006, White House officials wanted a vacant slot in the U.S. Attorney's office in Little Rock so that Griffin could fill it. Before this, he was a top Republican researcher and aide to Rove. On February 16, 2007, ten days after McNulty testified that Cummins was dismissed and resigned under duress to create a vacancy for Griffin's appointment, Griffin announced he would not seek the presidential nomination to be U.S. attorney in Little Rock.

In September 2008, the Office of the Inspector General in the Department of Justice issued a report concluding that Cummins had not been removed for any reasons related to his performance, but rather to make a place for Griffin.

On August 11, 2009, The New York Times reported that previously classified White House emails showed that Karl Rove had lobbied for Griffin to be appointed Cummins's successor.

=== 2008 presidential election ===
On May 31, 2007, The Washington Post reported speculation that Griffin was in discussions with the then-nascent presidential campaign of Fred Thompson for a top-level post. Instead, Griffin set up an office in Little Rock for Mercury Public Affairs, a New York City-based firm, part of the Omnicom Group, at which Griffin had worked as general counsel and managing director. (The Thompson campaign paid Mercury Public Affairs to have Griffin as an advisor.) Then, after a short period with Mercury, he started Griffin Public Affairs and the Griffin Law Firm.

In late May 2008, columnist Robert Novak reported that Griffin had been named as the RNC's director of research for the presidential campaign of Senator John McCain of Arizona. Griffin was assigned to direct opposition research, "although final arrangements have not been pinned down," Novak said. But Griffin said he was not going back to the Republican National Committee (RNC), and that he had not talked to anyone in the GOP's leadership structure or with the McCain campaign about that role.

== U.S. House of Representatives ==
=== Elections ===
2010

On September 21, 2009, Griffin announced that he was running for Congress, to replace Democrat Vic Snyder who stepped down after fourteen years in Arkansas' 2nd congressional district. He defeated the Democratic nominee Joyce Elliott, then the outgoing Majority Leader of the Arkansas Senate. Elliott's campaign highlighted Griffin's past controversies such as the Bush campaign's voter caging efforts and his being named one of the "Crooked Candidates of 2010" by the liberal-leaning Citizens for Responsibility and Ethics in Washington.

Griffin won with 58% of the vote.

2012

Griffin won re-election with 55% of the vote, over former state representative Herb Rule.

=== Tenure ===
In 2009, Griffin signed a pledge sponsored by Americans for Prosperity promising to vote against any Global warming legislation that would raise taxes.

=== Legislation sponsored ===
- Authority for Mandate Delay Act (H.R. 2667; 113th Congress) (H.R. 2667) – Rep. Griffin introduced this bill on July 11, 2013 in response to a July 2, 2013 announcement from the Obama Administration that they would be delaying one of the key requirements of the Patient Protection and Affordable Care Act (commonly known as "Obamacare"). Their decision was that the requirement that all companies which employed more than 50 workers must offer an employee health insurance plan or pay a fine, scheduled to begin January 1, 2014, would now be delayed until 2015. This decision was immediately criticized by Republicans for exceeding executive authority.

In response to the Obama Administration's decision, then House Majority Leader Eric Cantor announced that Congress would need to approve any delay. When he explained why he had introduced the bill, Griffin argued that, although he believed the Obama Administration's unilateral decision to delay the mandate was illegal, he still believed delaying the mandate was a good way to save jobs and protect workers.

- Griffin, along with Rep. Ander Crenshaw and Rep. Candice Miller, introduced the Save Our Military Shopping Benefits Act in 2014. The bill would prohibit the military from closing or cutting commissary stores and exchanges on bases in the United States.

=== Committee assignments ===
Griffin served on the following committees and subcommittees:

- Committee on Ways and Means
  - Subcommittee on Human Resources
  - Subcommittee on Social Security
- Republican Study Committee

On January 16, 2014, House Ways and Means Subcommittee on Social Security held a hearing with the head of Social Security and the Social Security inspector general. During the hearing, Griffin challenged statistics presented by Carolyn Colvin, the acting commissioner of the Social Security Administration. In her testimony, Colvin said that 99 percent of Social Security disability payments are correctly made without fraud.

== Lieutenant governor ==
=== 2014 election ===
Griffin was the Republican nominee for Lieutenant Governor of Arkansas in the 2014 elections. He defeated two Republican challengers in the primary election, both outgoing members of the Arkansas House of Representatives, Andy Mayberry and Debra Hobbs, taking 63 percent of the vote to Mayberry's 21 percent and Hobbs' 16 percent.

In the general election on November 4, 2014, Griffin defeated Democrat John Burkhalter in the lieutenant governor's race.

=== 2018 election ===
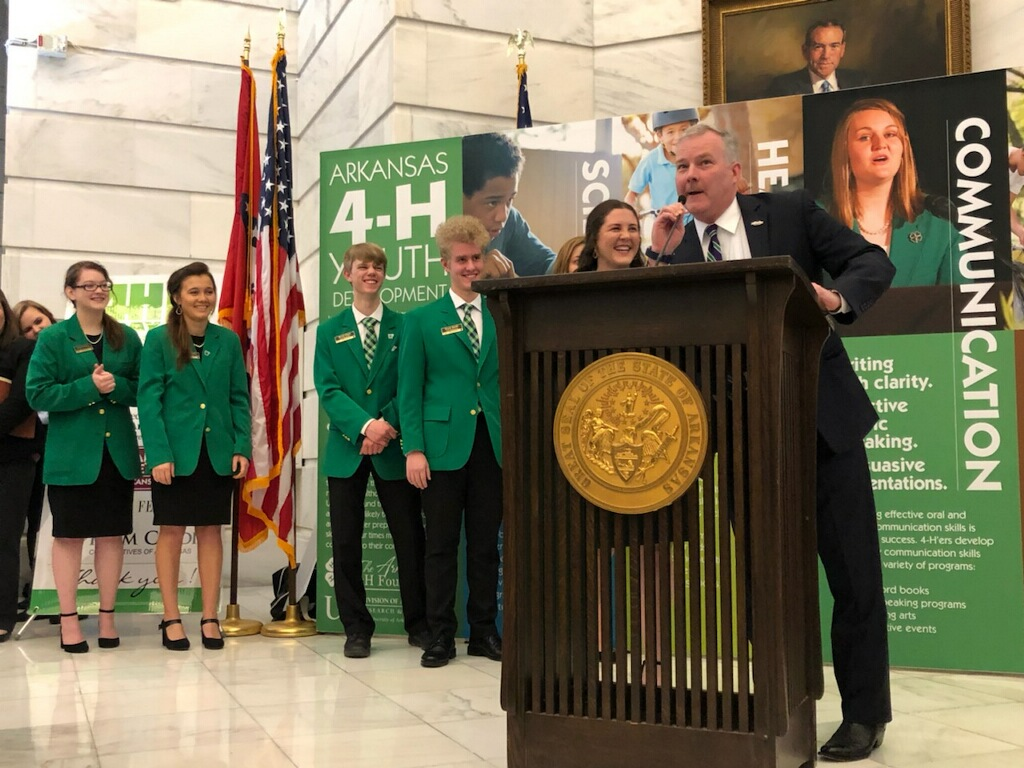
Griffin speaks at an event in the capitol

Griffin won re-election in the 2018 general election.

== Attorney General ==
As attorney general, Griffin is among several state attorneys who signed on an Amicus Brief in another book-banning lawsuit currently in the 11th Circuit that challenges Florida’s authority to decide which books can be removed from public schools in the state. In August of 2026, he praised the controversial book censorship law Arkansas Act 372 for allowing Arkansas to enforce a law intended to protect children from obscene materials.

== Personal life ==
Griffin attended Immanuel Baptist Church, a Southern Baptist congregation in Little Rock.

== Electoral history ==
Arkansas's 2nd Congressional District Republican Primary Election, 2010
Party	Candidate	Votes	%
Republican	Tim Griffin	24,610	61.69
Republican	Scott Wallace	15,285	38.31

Arkansas's 2nd Congressional District Election, 2010
Party	Candidate	Votes	%
Republican	Tim Griffin	122,091	57.90
Democratic	Joyce Elliott	80,687	38.27
Independent	Lance Levi	4,421	2.10
Green	Lewis Kennedy	3,599	1.71
Write-ins	Write-ins	54	0.03

Arkansas's 2nd Congressional District Election, 2012
Party	Candidate	Votes	%
Republican	Tim Griffin (inc.)	158,175	55.19
Democratic	Herb Rule	113,156	39.48
Green	Barbara Ward	8,566	2.99
Libertarian	Chris Hayes	6,701	2.34

Arkansas Lieutenant Governor Republican Primary Election, 2014
Party	Candidate	Votes	%
Republican	Tim Griffin	109,851	63.37
Republican	Andy Mayberry	35,703	20.60
Republican	Debra Hobbs	27,803	16.04

Arkansas Lieutenant Governor Election, 2014
Party	Candidate	Votes	%
Republican	Tim Griffin	479,673	57.16
Democratic	John Burkhalter	324,620	38.64
Libertarian	Christopher Olson	32,257	4.20

U.S. House of Representatives
Preceded by Vic Snyder	Member of the U.S. House of Representatives from Arkansas's 2nd congressional district 2011–2015	Succeeded by French Hill
Party political offices
Preceded by Mark Darr	Republican nominee for Lieutenant Governor of Arkansas; 2014, 2018	Succeeded by Leslie Rutledge
Preceded by Leslie Rutledge	Republican nominee for Attorney General of Arkansas; 2022, 2026	Most recent
Political offices
Preceded by Mark Darr	Lieutenant Governor of Arkansas; 2015–2023	Succeeded by Leslie Rutledge
Legal offices
Preceded by Leslie Rutledge	Attorney General of Arkansas; 2023–present	Incumbent
U.S. order of precedence (ceremonial)
Preceded by Cori Bush as Former U.S. Representative	Order of precedence of the United States as Former U.S. Representative	Succeeded by David Stockman as Former U.S. Representative
