= Loss ratio =

Ratio of losses to gains

A loss ratio is a ratio of losses to gains, used normally in a financial context. It is the reciprocal of the gross profit ratio (commonly known as the gross profit margin).

== Insurance loss ratio ==
For insurance, the loss ratio is the ratio of total losses incurred (paid and reserved) in claims plus adjustment expenses divided by the total premiums earned. For example, if an insurance company pays $60 in claims for every $100 in collected premiums, then its loss ratio is 60% with a profit ratio/gross margin of 40% or $40. Some portion of those 40 dollars must pay all operating costs (things such as overhead and payroll), and what is left is the net profit.

Loss ratios for property and casualty insurance (e.g. motor car insurance) typically range from 70% to 99%. Such companies are collecting premiums more than the amount paid in claims. Conversely, insurers that consistently experience high loss ratios may be in bad financial health. They may not be collecting enough premium to pay claims, expenses, and still make a reasonable profit.

The terms "permissible", "target", "balance point", or "expected" loss ratio are used interchangeably to refer to the loss ratio necessary to fulfill the insurer's profitability goal. This ratio is 1 minus the expense ratio, where the expenses consist of general and administrative expenses, commissions and advertising expenses, profit and contingencies, and various other expenses. Expenses associated with insurance payouts ("losses") are sometimes considered as part of the loss ratio. When calculating a rate change, the insurer will typically divide the incurred or actual experienced loss ratio (AER) by the permissible loss ratio.

== Banking loss ratio ==
For banking, a loss ratio is the total amount of unrecoverable debt when compared to total outstanding debt. For example, if $100 was loaned, but only $90 was repaid, the bank has a loss ratio of 10%. These calculations are applied class-wide and used to determine financing fees for loans. If the average loss ratio on a class of loans is 2%, then the financing fees for loans of that class must be greater than 2% to recover the normal loss and return a profit.

== Medical loss ratio ==
In the late 1990s, loss ratios for health insurance (known as the medical loss ratio, or MLR) ranged from 60% to 110% (40% profits to 10% losses). As of 2007, the average US medical loss ratio for private insurers was 81% (a 19% profit and expense ratio).

In an amendment written by Senator Al Franken, the Patient Protection and Affordable Care Act of 2010 now mandates minimum MLRs of 85% for the large group market and 80% for the individual and small group markets. Insurers that do not spend 80–85% of their premiums in health care costs must now issue rebates to consumers.
