= Kevin Counihan =

American healthcare executive

Kevin Counihan is the former CEO of healthcare.gov. He previously headed Connecticut’s health insurance exchange.

In 2017, he joined health care insurance company Centene.
