= Stride Health =

Stride Health, Inc.
- Company type: Startup
- Industry: Healthcare Navigation
- Founded: 1 January 2013
- Founder: Noah Lang; Matt Butner
- Headquarters: San Francisco, California, U.S.
- Area served: U.S.
- Website: StrideHealth.com

Stride Health, Inc. is a California startup focused on connecting individuals with health plans under the Affordable Care Act. Its approach to the marketplace has led to coverage from Wired Magazine, re/code, the San Francisco Chronicle and others. It is backed by New Enterprise Associates and Venrock.

== Services ==
According to Wired, the company exploits "a failing of the new federal and state health insurance marketplaces: a lack of quick recommendations tailored to specific needs of consumers." It provides a search service for consumers to find a health plan that fits their unique needs and circumstances, "such as age, gender, illnesses, medications, doctors they want to see and smoking habits." Other sources refer to this service as a "recommendation engine."

In January 2015, Stride Health launched a new mobile-focused version of its healthcare recommendation engine.

== Personnel ==
The company was founded by Noah Lang (formerly of Reputation.com) and Matt Butner (formerly of [R/GA]).
