= Health Care and Education Reconciliation Act of 2010 =

United States law

- Long title: An Act to provide for reconciliation pursuant to Title II of the concurrent resolution on the budget for fiscal year 2010 (S. Con. Res. 13).
- Enacted by: the 111th United States Congress

Citations
- Public law: 111-152
- Statutes at Large: 124 Stat. 1029 thru 124 Stat. 1084 (55 pages)

Codification
- Acts amended: Affordable Care Act

Legislative history
- Introduced in the House as H.R. 4872 by John Spratt (D-SC) on March 17, 2010; Committee consideration by Budget; Passed the House on March 21, 2010 (220–211); Passed the Senate on March 25, 2010 (56-43) with amendment; House agreed to Senate amendment on March 25, 2010 (220–207); Signed into law by President Barack Obama on March 30, 2010

House votes by congressional district: Democratic yea on both votes Democratic nay on both votes Democratic nay on first vote, not voting on second Republican nay on both votes Republican nay on first vote, not voting on second Republican nay on first vote, no representative seated on second No representative seated

Senate vote by state: Democratic yea Democratic nay Independent yea Republican nay Republican not voting

The Health Care and Education Reconciliation Act of 2010 (Pub. L. 111–152 (text) (PDF), 124 Stat. 1029) was enacted by the 111th United States Congress, by means of the budget reconciliation process, in order to amend and extend the recently passed legislation expanding healthcare access known as the Affordable Care Act (ACA)(Pub. L. 111–148 (text) (PDF)) (together, the bills implemented a healthcare reform that became known as "Obamacare").

The reconciliation also included the Student Aid and Fiscal Responsibility Act of 2009, which was attached as a rider: this pairing allowed Democrats to achieve reforms to student loans programs, but critically it also provided budget savings sufficient to offset the ACA's dramatically increased investment in healthcare; which in turn meant that the reform bills could be progressed and passed through the Senate using the budget reconciliation procedures, avoiding threatened Republican filibusters that otherwise would derail what were two of the major domestic policy reform priorities of the new President Obama.

The large and complex reconciliation bill was passed by the U.S. House of Representatives on March 21, 2010, by a vote of 220–211, and passed the Senate by a vote of 56–43 on March 25, after having had two minor provisions (relating to Pell Grants) stricken under the Byrd Rule. A few hours later the bill, as amended, was passed in the House by a vote of 220–207. The Act was signed into law by President Barack Obama on March 30, 2010, at Northern Virginia Community College.

== Legislative history ==
At the end of 2009, each house of Congress passed its own health care reform bill, but neither passed the bill from the other chamber. The Senate bill, the Patient Protection and Affordable Care Act, was less ambitious overall than the House's attempt: Democrats controlled the House, which was as a consequence of the election more progressive than the Senate. And the need for significant systematic healthcare reform was understood and acknowledged popularly, including by the President, who had determined healthcare would be the major reform push of his early presidency. Democrats' more extensive proposed reforms, however, would not easily pass the Senate, where they had a majority but less than the de facto majority requirement of 60 (of 100 total senators). Taking up the Senate's already passed, if relatively unambitious, bill was therefore the most viable avenue to the achievement of reforms; this was especially true following the death of Democratic Senator Ted Kennedy and his replacement by Republican Scott Brown. Lacking a filibuster-proof super-majority in the Senate, the Obama administration and House Speaker Nancy Pelosi encouraged the House to pass the Senate bill, building that as a foundation, and then come back to pass another, new bill — to amend and extend and fund what had been done by the Senate-drafted ACA — using the budget reconciliation process.

Under the Fiscal Year 2010 budget resolution, the text of the reconciliation bill submitted to the Budget Committee had to have been reported by the relevant Committees by October 15, 2009. Therefore, the Democrats combined the text of America's Affordable Health Choices Act of 2009 as reported out of the Ways and Means Committee, and as it was reported out of the Education and Labor Committee, and the text of the Student Aid and Fiscal Responsibility Act as reported out of the Education and Labor Committee. This version was never meant to be passed; it was only created so that the reconciliation bill would comply with the Budget resolution. The bill was automatically amended to the version that was meant to be passed per the special rule that was reported out of the Rules Committee. The Student Aid and Fiscal Responsibility Act was added to the Reconciliation Act as only one reconciliation bill can be passed each budget year, and it also faced a tough road through the Senate due to Republican filibuster and opposition from several centrist Democratic Senators. The move was also thought to give President Obama two key victories in overhauling the health care and student loan system. It also eventually became clear that the budget savings caused by the student loan bill would become essential to the overall reconciliation bill by reducing the deficit enough for the overall bill to qualify for the reconciliation process.

Passage of the legislation in the United States House of Representatives using the self-executing rule method was considered, but rejected by House Democrats. Instead, on March 21, 2010, the House held a series of votes: the first vote on ordering the previous question on the special rule resolution that set the terms of debate, the second on the rule itself, the third on the Senate bill, the fourth on a minority attempt to amend the reconciliation bill itself, and finally a vote on the reconciliation bill itself. The reconciliation bill passed on a vote of 220–211, with all 178 Republicans and 33 Democrats voting against it.

In the Senate, the bill faced numerous amendments made by the Republicans, which failed. Republicans struck two provisions dealing with Pell Grants from the bill due to violations of budget reconciliation rules, forcing the bill to return to the House. The two provisions were the fourth paragraph of Sec. 2101(a)(2)(C) and Sec. 2101(a)(2)(D). On March 25, the bill passed the Senate by a 56–43 vote, with all Republicans and three Democrats (Blanche Lincoln (D-AR), Ben Nelson (D-NE) and Mark Pryor (D-AR)) voting against it. Later that same day, the House passed the amended bill by a 220–207 vote, sending it to President Obama for a signature. On March 30, 2010 Obama signed the Health Care and Education Reconciliation Act of 2010, seven days after he had signed the Patient Protection and Affordable Care Act into law.

== Provisions ==
The Health Care and Education Reconciliation Act is divided into two titles, one addressing health care reform and the other addressing student loan reform.

=== Amending the Senate's Healthcare Bill ===
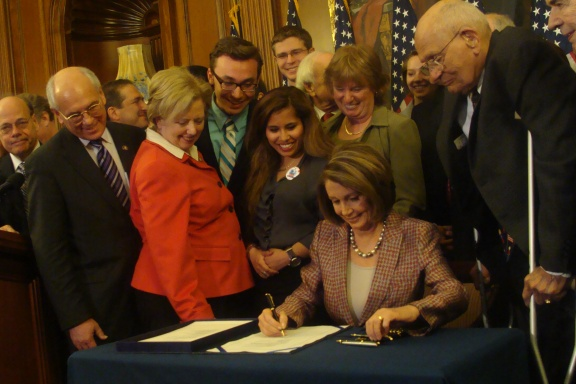
Speaker of the House Nancy Pelosi signing the bill after it passed in the House of Representatives on March 26, 2010

The Reconciliation bill made several changes to the Affordable Care Act that was signed into law seven days earlier on March 23, 2010. These changes include the following:

- Increasing tax credits to buy insurance
- Eliminating several of the special deals given to senators, such as Ben Nelson's "Cornhusker Kickback"
- Lowering the penalty for not buying insurance from $750 to $695
- Closing the Medicare Part D "donut hole" by 2020, giving seniors a rebate of $250.
- Delaying the implementation on taxing "Cadillac health-care plans" until 2018
- Requiring doctors treating Medicare patients to be reimbursed at the full rate
- Setting up a Medicare tax on the unearned incomes of families that earn more than $250,000 annually.
- Offering more generous subsidies to lower income groups. Households below 150% of the federal poverty level would pay 2-4% of their income on premiums. Health plans would cover 94% of the cost of benefits. Households with incomes from 150-400% of the federal poverty level ($88,200 for a family of four) would pay on a sliding scale from 4-9.8% of their income on premiums, rest will be covered by government advanceable, refundable tax credit. Health plans would cover 70% of the cost of the benefits.
- Setting a penalty for a company with more than 50 workers not offering health care coverage after 2014, of $2,000 for each full-time worker above 30 employees. For example, an employer with 53 workers will pay the penalty for 23 workers, or $46,000.
- Increasing Medicaid payment rates to primary care doctors to match Medicare payment rates, which are higher, in 2013 and 2014.
- Having the federal government pay all costs of expanding Medicaid under the reform until 2016, 95% in 2017, 94% in 2018, 93% in 2019, and 90% thereafter. Some states that already insure childless adults under Medicaid would receive more federal money for covering that group through 2018.
- Providing a 50% discount on brand-name drugs for Medicare patients starting in 2011. By 2020, the government would pay to provide up to 75% discount on brand-name and generic drugs, eventually closing the coverage gap.
- Extending the ban on lifetime limits and rescission of coverage to all existing health plans within six months after signing into Law.

=== Student loan reform ===
Title II of the reconciliation bill deals with student loan reform. The language is very similar to the Student Aid and Fiscal Responsibility Act that passed the House in 2009; but with some slight variation. The reform package included,

- Ending the process of the federal government giving subsidies to private banks to give out federally insured loans. Instead loans will be administered directly by the Department of Education (beginning on July 1, 2010).
- Increasing the Pell Grant scholarship award.
- For new borrowers of loans starting in 2014, those who qualify would be able to cap the amount they must spend on loan repayment each month to 10% of their discretionary income, down from 15%.
- For new borrowers after 2014, loans would be eligible to be forgiven to those who make timely payments after 20 years, down from 25 years previously.
- making it easier for parents to take out federal loans for students.
- using several billion dollars to fund schools that predominantly serve poor and minority students, as well as increasing community college funding.

=== Tax avoidance ===
The law codified the "economic substance" rule of Gregory v. Helvering from 1935, which allows the IRS to invalidate tax avoidance transactions in certain situations.

== Deficit effect ==
The Congressional Budget Office's last estimate predicted that if both bills were passed into law in 2010, the net reduction in federal deficits would be $143 billion over the 2010–2019 period as a result of the proposed changes in direct spending and revenues. That figure comprises $124 billion in net reductions deriving from the health care and revenue provisions and $19 billion in net reductions deriving from the education provisions. The health care and revenue provisions consist in part of several new taxes, fees on health-related industries, and cuts in government spending on healthcare programs like Medicare Advantage.

== See also ==
- 111th United States Congress
- Patient Protection and Affordable Care Act
- Health care reform in the United States
- Health care reform debate in the United States
