= Calorie count laws =

Food law

Calorie count laws are a type of law that require restaurants (typically only larger restaurant chains) to post food energy and nutritional information on the food served on menus.

Studies of consumer behavior have shown that for some fast-food chains, consumers reduce calorie consumption but at other chains they do not. In response to federal regulation in the United States, some restaurant chains have modified certain items to reduce calories, or introduced new menu items as lower-calorie alternatives.

== United States ==
The first U.S. menu item calorie labeling law was enacted in 2008 in New York City. California was the first state to enact a calorie count law, which occurred in 2009. Restaurants that do not comply can be fined up to $2,000.

Other localities and states have passed similar laws.

Nutrition labeling requirements of the Affordable Care Act were signed into federal law in 2010, but their implementation was delayed by the FDA several times until they went into effect on May 7, 2018.

== Australia ==
In 2011, the council of Australian governments and the forum on food regulation (formerly known as the Australia and New Zealand food regulation ministerial council) released the Labeling Logic report, recommending the mandatory display of the energy content of standardized food items on menus in chain food service outlets and vending machines.

Between 2011 and 2018, mandatory menu labeling, especially for displaying nutritional information at the point of sale in standard food outlets, was introduced by five Australian jurisdictions (New South Wales, South Australia, Australian Capital Territory, Queensland, and Victoria) with some variation in implementation.

== Legal challenges ==
In 2009, a federal appellate court rejected the New York State Restaurant Association's challenge to the city's 2007 regulation requiring most major fast-food and chain restaurants to prominently display calorie information on their menus. The rule applies to restaurants that are part of chains with at least 15 establishments doing business nationally.
