= Affordable Care Act =

U.S. federal healthcare statute

Patient Protection and Affordable Care Act
- Long title: The Patient Protection and Affordable Care Act
- Acronyms (colloquial): ACA, PPACA
- Nicknames: Obamacare, Affordable Care Act, Health Insurance Reform, Healthcare Reform
- Enacted by: the 111th United States Congress
- Effective: March 23, 2010; 16 years ago Most major provisions phased in by January 2014; remaining provisions phased in by 2020; penalty enforcing individual mandate set at $0 starting 2019

Citations
- Public law: 111–148
- Statutes at Large: 124 Stat. 119 through 124 Stat. 1025 (906 pages)

Codification
- Acts amended: Public Health Service Act
- Titles amended: 42 U.S.C.: Public Health and Social Welfare

Legislative history
- Introduced in the House as the "Service Members Home Ownership Tax Act of 2009" (H.R. 3590) by Charles Rangel (D–NY) on September 17, 2009; Committee consideration by Ways and Means; Passed the House on November 7, 2009 (220–215); Passed the Senate as the "Patient Protection and Affordable Care Act" on December 24, 2009 (60–39) with amendment; House agreed to Senate amendment on March 21, 2010 (219–212); Signed into law by President Barack Obama on March 23, 2010

Major amendments
- Health Care and Education Reconciliation Act of 2010; Comprehensive 1099 Taxpayer Protection and Repayment of Exchange Subsidy Overpayments Act of 2011; Tax Cuts and Jobs Act of 2017

United States Supreme Court cases
- National Federation of Independent Business v. Sebelius, 567 U.S. 519 (2012); Burwell v. Hobby Lobby Stores, Inc., 573 U.S. 682 (2014); King v. Burwell, 576 U.S. 473 (2015); Zubik v. Burwell, 578 U.S. 403 (2016); Maine Community Health Options v. United States, 590 U.S. 296 (2020); Little Sisters of the Poor Saints Peter and Paul Home v. Pennsylvania, 591 U.S. 657 (2020); California v. Texas, 593 U.S. 659 (2021); Cummings v. Premier Rehab Keller, P.L.L.C., 596 U.S. 212 (2022)

The Affordable Care Act (ACA), formally the Patient Protection and Affordable Care Act (PPACA) and informally known as Obamacare, is a landmark U.S. federal statute enacted by the 111th United States Congress and signed into law by President Barack Obama on March 23, 2010. Together with amendments made to it by the Health Care and Education Reconciliation Act of 2010, it represents the U.S. healthcare system's most significant regulatory overhaul and expansion of coverage since the enactment of Medicare and Medicaid in 1965. Most of the act remains in effect.

The ACA's major provisions came into force in 2014. By 2016, the uninsured share of the population had roughly halved, with estimates ranging from 20 to 24 million additional people covered. The law also enacted delivery system reforms intended to constrain healthcare costs and improve quality. After it came into effect, increases in overall healthcare spending slowed, including premiums for employer-based insurance plans. The increased coverage was due, roughly equally, to an expansion of Medicaid eligibility and changes to individual insurance markets. Both received new spending, funded by a combination of new taxes and cuts to Medicare provider rates and Medicare Advantage. Several Congressional Budget Office (CBO) reports stated that overall these provisions reduced the budget deficit, that repealing ACA would increase the deficit, and that the law reduced income inequality.

The act largely retained the existing structure of Medicare, Medicaid, and the employer market, but individual markets were radically overhauled. Insurers were made to accept all applicants without charging based on pre-existing conditions or demographic status (except age). To combat the resultant adverse selection, the act mandated that individuals buy insurance (or pay a monetary penalty) and that insurers cover a list of "essential health benefits". Young people were allowed to stay on their parents' insurance plans until they were 26 years old.

Before and after its enactment the ACA faced strong political opposition, calls for repeal, and legal challenges. In the Sebelius decision, the U.S. Supreme Court ruled that Congress cannot use the Commerce Clause to compel individuals to buy health insurance but upheld the individual mandate by recharacterizing the penalty as a tax. The Court also held that states could opt out of the ACA's Medicaid expansion without losing existing federal Medicaid funding, while otherwise upholding the law. This led Republican-controlled states to not participate in Medicaid expansion. Polls initially found that 43% of Americans wanted to see the law repealed or scaled back and 49% wanted to see it expanded or enacted as is. By 2017, the law had majority support. The Tax Cuts and Jobs Act of 2017 set the individual mandate penalty at $0 starting in 2019.

== Provisions ==
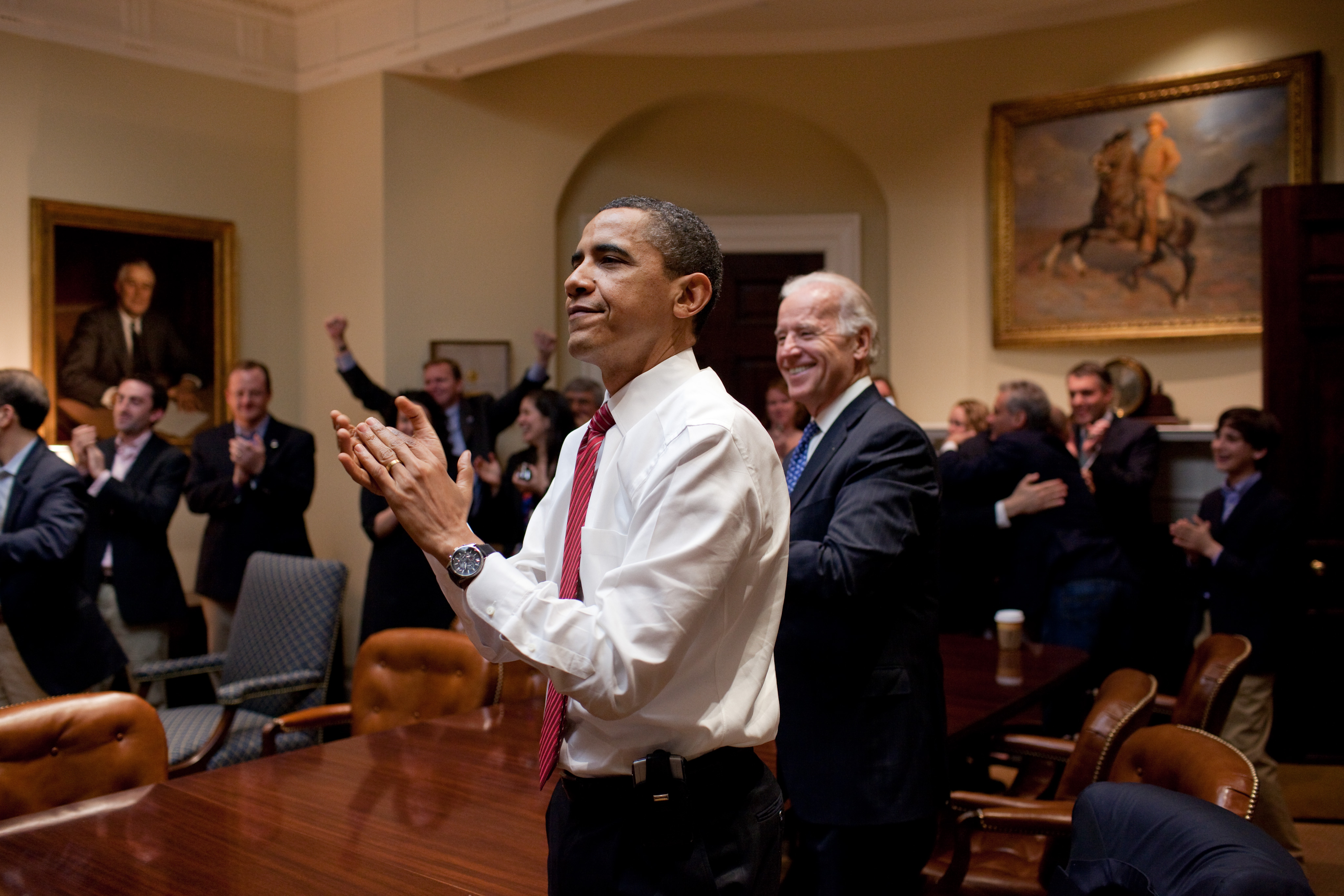
President Obama and White House staff react to the House of Representatives passing the bill on March 21, 2010.

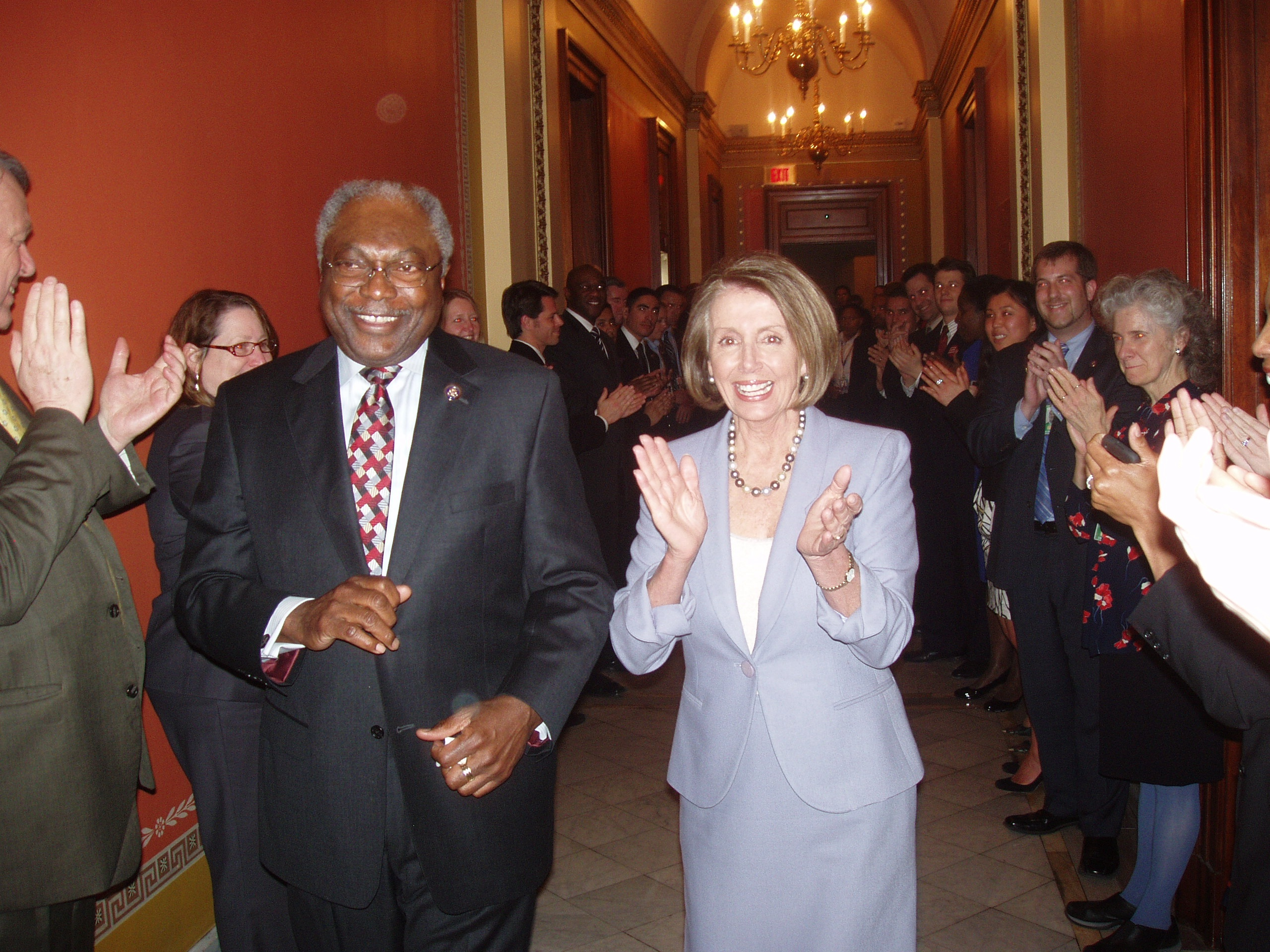
Jim Clyburn and Nancy Pelosi celebrate after the House passes the amended bill on March 21.

ACA amended the Public Health Service Act of 1944 and inserted new provisions on affordable care into Title 42 of the United States Code. The individual insurance market was radically overhauled, and many of the law's regulations applied specifically to this market, while the structure of Medicare, Medicaid, and the employer market were largely retained. Some regulations applied to the employer market, and the law also made delivery system changes that affected most of the health care system.

=== Insurance regulations: individual policies ===
All new individual major medical health insurance policies sold to individuals and families faced new requirements. The requirements took effect on January 1, 2014. They include:

- Guaranteed issue prohibits insurers from denying coverage to individuals because of preexisting conditions.
- States were required to ensure the availability of insurance for individual children who did not have coverage via their families.
- A partial community rating allows premiums to vary only by age and location, regardless of preexisting conditions. Premiums for older applicants can be no more than three times those for the youngest.
- Essential health benefits must be provided. The National Academy of Medicine defines the law's "essential health benefits" as "ambulatory patient services; emergency services; hospitalization; maternity and newborn care; mental health and substance use disorder services, including behavioral health treatment; prescription drugs; rehabilitative and habilitative services and devices; laboratory services; preventive and wellness services and chronic disease management; and pediatric services, including oral and vision care" and others rated Level A or B by the U.S. Preventive Services Task Force. In determining essential benefits, the law required that standard benefits should offer at least that of a "typical employer plan". States may require additional services.
- Preventive care and screenings for women. "[A]ll Food and Drug Administration approved contraceptive methods, sterilization procedures, and patient education and counseling for all women with reproductive capacity". This mandate applies to all employers and educational institutions except for religious organizations. These regulations were included on the recommendations of the Institute of Medicine.

In 2012 Senator Sheldon Whitehouse created this summary to explain his view on the act.

- Annual and lifetime coverage caps on essential benefits were banned.
- Insurers are forbidden from dropping policyholders when they become ill.
- All policies must provide an annual maximum out-of-pocket (MOOP) payment cap for an individual's or family's medical expenses (excluding premiums). After the MOOP payment is reached, all remaining costs must be paid by the insurer.
- Preventive care, vaccinations and medical screenings cannot be subject to co-payments, co-insurance or deductibles. Specific examples of covered services include: mammograms and colonoscopies, wellness visits, gestational diabetes screening, HPV testing, STI counseling, HIV screening and counseling, contraceptive methods, breastfeeding support/supplies and domestic violence screening and counseling.
- The law established four tiers of coverage: bronze, silver, gold and platinum. All categories offer essential health benefits. The categories vary in their division of premiums and out-of-pocket costs: bronze plans have the lowest monthly premiums and highest out-of-pocket costs, while platinum plans are the reverse. The percentages of health care costs that plans are expected to cover through premiums (as opposed to out-of-pocket costs) are, on average: 60% (bronze), 70% (silver), 80% (gold), and 90% (platinum).
- Insurers are required to implement an appeals process for coverage determination and claims on all new plans.
- Insurers must spend at least 80–85% of premium dollars on health costs; rebates must be issued if this is violated.

=== Individual mandate ===
The individual mandate required everyone to have insurance or pay a penalty. The mandate and limits on open enrollment were designed to avoid the insurance death spiral, minimize the free rider problem and prevent the healthcare system from succumbing to adverse selection.

The mandate was intended to increase the size and diversity of the insured population, including more young and healthy participants to broaden the risk pool, spreading costs.

Among the groups who were not subject to the individual mandate are:

- Undocumented immigrants. Estimated at 8 million, roughly a third of the 23 million projection, they are ineligible for insurance subsidies and Medicaid. They remain eligible for emergency services.
- Medicaid-eligible citizens not enrolled in Medicaid.
- Citizens whose insurance coverage would cost more than 8% of household income.
- Citizens who live in states that opt-out of Medicaid expansion and who qualify for neither existing Medicaid coverage nor subsidized coverage.

The Tax Cuts and Jobs Act of 2017, set to $0 the penalty for not complying with the individual mandate, starting in 2019.

=== Exchanges ===
ACA mandated that health insurance exchanges be provided for each state. The exchanges are regulated, largely online marketplaces, administered by either federal or state governments, where individuals, families and small businesses can purchase private insurance plans. Exchanges first offered insurance for 2014. Some exchanges also provide access to Medicaid.

States that set up their own exchanges have some discretion on standards and prices. For example, states approve plans for sale, and thereby influence (through negotiations) prices. They can impose additional coverage requirements—such as abortion. Alternatively, states can make the federal government responsible for operating their exchanges.

=== Premium subsidies ===
Individuals whose household incomes are between 100% and 400% of the federal poverty level (FPL) are eligible to receive federal subsidies for premiums for policies purchased on an ACA exchange, provided they are not eligible for Medicare, Medicaid, the Children's Health Insurance Program, or other forms of public assistance health coverage, and do not have access to affordable coverage (no more than 9.86% of income for the employee's coverage) through their own or a family member's employer. Households below the federal poverty level are not eligible to receive these subsidies. Lawful Residents and some other legally present immigrants whose household income is below 100% FPL and are not otherwise eligible for Medicaid are eligible for subsidies if they meet all other eligibility requirements. Married people must file taxes jointly to receive subsidies. Enrollees must have U.S. citizenship or proof of legal residency to obtain a subsidy.

The subsidies for an ACA plan purchased on an exchange stop at 400% of the federal poverty level (FPL). According to the Kaiser Foundation, this results in a sharp "discontinuity of treatment" at 400% FPL, which is sometimes called the "subsidy cliff". After-subsidy premiums for the second lowest cost silver plan (SCLSP) just below the cliff are 9.86% of income in 2019.

Subsidies are provided as an advanceable, refundable tax credit.

The amount of subsidy is sufficient to reduce the premium for the second-lowest-cost silver plan (SCLSP) on an exchange to a sliding-scale percentage of income. The percentage is based on the percent of federal poverty level (FPL) for the household, and varies slightly from year to year. In 2019, it ranged from 2.08% of income (100%-133% FPL) to 9.86% of income (300%-400% FPL). The subsidy can be used for any plan available on the exchange, but not catastrophic plans. The subsidy may not exceed the premium for the purchased plan.

(In this section, the term "income" refers to modified adjusted gross income.)

Small businesses are eligible for a tax credit provided they enroll in the SHOP Marketplace.

Maximum net premium after subsidies (2019) for family of four
Income % of federal poverty level	Premium cap as a share of income	Income^{a}	Maximum^{b} annual net premium after subsidy (second-lowest-cost silver plan)	Maximum out-of-pocket
133%	3.11% of income	$33,383	$1,038	$5,200
150%	4.15% of income	$37,650	$1,562	$5,200
200%	6.54% of income	$50,200	$3,283	$5,200
250%	8.36% of income	$62,750	$5,246	$12,600
300%	9.86% of income	$75,300	$7,425	$15,800
400%	9.86% of income	$100,400	$9,899	$15,800
a.In 2019, the federal poverty level was $25,100 for family of four (outside of Alaska and Hawaii). b.If the premium for the second lowest cost silver plan (SLCSP) is greater than the amount in this column, the amount of the premium subsidy will be such that it brings the net cost of the SCLSP down to the amount in this column. Otherwise, there will be no subsidy, and the SLCSP premium will (of course) be no more than (usually less than) the amount in this column. Note: The numbers in the table do not apply for Alaska and Hawaii.

=== Cost-sharing reduction subsidies ===
As written, ACA mandated that insurers reduce copayments and deductibles for ACA exchange enrollees earning less than 250% of the FPL. Medicaid recipients were not eligible for the reductions.

So-called cost-sharing reduction (CSR) subsidies were to be paid to insurance companies to fund the reductions. During 2017, approximately $7 billion in CSR subsidies were to be paid, versus $34 billion for premium tax credits.

The latter was defined as mandatory spending that does not require an annual Congressional appropriation. CSR payments were not explicitly defined as mandatory. This led to litigation and disruption later.

=== Risk management ===
==== Risk corridors ====
The risk corridor program was a temporary risk management device. It was intended to encourage reluctant insurers into ACA insurance market from 2014 to 2016. For those years the Department of Health and Human Services (DHHS) would cover some of the losses for insurers whose plans performed worse than they expected. Loss-making insurers would receive payments paid for in part by profit-making insurers. Similar risk corridors had been established for the Medicare prescription drug benefit.

While many insurers initially offered exchange plans, the program did not pay for itself as planned, losing up to $8.3 billion for 2014 and 2015. Authorization had to be given so DHHS could pay insurers from "general government revenues". However, the Consolidated Appropriations Act, 2014 stated that no funds "could be used for risk-corridor payments". leaving the government in a potential breach of contract with insurers who offered qualified health plans.

Several insurers sued the government at the United States Court of Federal Claims to recover the funds believed owed to them under the Risk Corridors program. While several were summarily closed, in the case of Moda Health v the United States, Moda Health won a $214-million judgment in February 2017. Federal Claims judge Thomas C. Wheeler stated, "the Government made a promise in the risk corridors program that it has yet to fulfill. Today, the court directs the Government to fulfill that promise." Moda Health's case was appealed by the government to the United States Court of Appeals for the Federal Circuit along with the appeals of the other insurers; here, the Federal Circuit reversed the Moda Health ruling and ruled across all the cases in favor of the government, that the appropriations riders ceded the government from paying out remain money due to the insurers. The Supreme Court reversed this ruling in the consolidated case, Maine Community Health Options v. United States, reaffirming as with Judge Wheeler that the government had a responsibility to pay those funds under the ACA and the use of riders to de-obligate its from those payments was illegal.

==== Reinsurance ====
The temporary reinsurance program is meant to stabilize premiums by reducing the incentive for insurers to raise premiums due to concerns about higher-risk enrollees. Reinsurance was based on retrospective costs rather than prospective risk evaluations. Reinsurance was available from 2014 through 2016.

==== Risk adjustment ====
Risk adjustment involves transferring funds from plans with lower-risk enrollees to plans with higher-risk enrollees. It was intended to encourage insurers to compete based on value and efficiency rather than by attracting healthier enrollees. Of the three risk management programs, only risk adjustment was permanent. Plans with low actuarial risk compensate plans with high actuarial risk.

=== Medicaid expansion ===
ACA revised and expanded Medicaid eligibility starting in 2014. All U.S. citizens and legal residents with income up to 133% of the poverty line would qualify for coverage in any state that participated in the Medicaid program. Previously, states could set various lower thresholds for certain groups and were not required to cover adults without dependent children. The federal government was to pay 100% of the increased cost in 2014, 2015 and 2016; 95% in 2017, 94% in 2018, 93% in 2019, and 90% in 2020 and all subsequent years. A 5% "income disregard" made the effective income eligibility limit for Medicaid 138% of the poverty level. But in National Federation of Independent Business v. Sebelius, the Supreme Court found this provision of ACA coercive and held that states could choose to continue at pre-ACA eligibility levels.

=== Medicare savings ===
Medicare reimbursements were reduced to insurers and drug companies for private Medicare Advantage policies that the Government Accountability Office and Medicare Payment Advisory Commission found to be excessively costly relative to standard Medicare; and to hospitals that failed standards of efficiency and care.

=== Taxes ===
==== Medicare taxes ====
Income from self-employment and wages of single individuals in excess of $200,000 annually are subjected to an additional tax of 0.9%. The threshold amount is $250,000 for a married couple filing jointly (threshold applies to their total compensation), or $125,000 for a married person filing separately.

In ACA's companion legislation, the Health Care and Education Reconciliation Act of 2010, an additional tax of 3.8% was applied to unearned income, specifically the lesser of net investment income and the amount by which adjusted gross income exceeds the above income limits.

==== Excise taxes ====
ACA included an excise tax of 40% ("Cadillac tax") on total employer premium spending in excess of specified dollar amounts (initially $10,200 for single coverage and $27,500 for family coverage) indexed to inflation. This tax was originally scheduled to take effect in 2018, but was delayed until 2020 by the Consolidated Appropriations Act, 2016 and again to 2022. The excise tax on high-cost health plans was completely repealed as part of H.R.1865 - Further Consolidated Appropriations Act, 2020.

Excise taxes totaling $3 billion were levied on importers and manufacturers of prescription drugs. An excise tax of 2.3% on medical devices and a 10% excise tax on indoor tanning services were applied as well. The tax was repealed in late 2019.

=== SCHIP ===
The State Children's Health Insurance Program (CHIP) enrollment process was simplified.

=== Dependents ===
Beginning September 23, 2010, dependents were permitted to remain on their parents' insurance plan until their 26th birthday, including dependents who no longer lived with their parents, are not a dependent on a parent's tax return, are no longer a student, or are married.

=== Employer mandate ===
Businesses that employ 50 or more people but do not offer health insurance to their full-time employees are assessed additional tax if the government has subsidized a full-time employee's healthcare through tax deductions or other means. This is commonly known as the employer mandate. This provision was included to encourage employers to continue providing insurance once the exchanges began operating.

=== Delivery system reforms ===
The act includes delivery system reforms intended to constrain costs and improve quality. These include Medicare payment changes to discourage hospital-acquired conditions and readmissions, bundled payment initiatives, the Center for Medicare and Medicaid Innovation, the Independent Payment Advisory Board, and accountable care organizations.

==== Hospital quality ====
Health care cost/quality initiatives included incentives to reduce hospital infections, adopt electronic medical records, and to coordinate care and prioritize quality over quantity.

==== Bundled payments ====
Medicare switched from fee-for-service to bundled payments. A single payment was to be paid to a hospital and a physician group for a defined episode of care (such as a hip replacement) rather than separate payments to individual service providers.

==== Accountable care organizations ====
The Medicare Shared Savings Program (MSSP) was established by section 3022 of the Affordable Care Act. It is the program by which an accountable care organization interacts with the federal government, and by which accountable care organizations can be created. It is a fee-for-service model.

The Act allowed the creation of accountable care organizations (ACOs), which are groups of doctors, hospitals and other providers that commit to give coordinated care to Medicare patients. ACOs were allowed to continue using fee-for-service billing. They receive bonus payments from the government for minimizing costs while achieving quality benchmarks that emphasize prevention and mitigation of chronic disease. Missing cost or quality benchmarks subjected them to penalties.

Unlike health maintenance organizations, ACO patients are not required to obtain all care from the ACO. Also, unlike HMOs, ACOs must achieve quality-of-care goals.

=== Medicare drug benefit (Part D) ===
Medicare Part D participants received a 50% discount on brand-name drugs purchased after exhausting their initial coverage and before reaching the catastrophic-coverage threshold. By 2020, the "doughnut hole" would be completely filled.

=== State waivers ===
Beginning in 2017, states could apply for a "waiver for state innovation" that allows them to conduct experiments that meet certain criteria. To obtain a waiver, a state must pass legislation setting up an alternative health system that provides insurance at least as comprehensive and as affordable as ACA, covers at least as many residents and does not increase the federal deficit. These states can escape some of ACA's central requirements, including the individual and employer mandates and the provision of an insurance exchange. The state would receive compensation equal to the aggregate amount of any federal subsidies and tax credits for which its residents and employers would have been eligible under ACA, if they cannot be paid under the state plan.

=== Other insurance provisions ===
The Community Living Assistance Services and Supports Act (or CLASS Act) established a voluntary and public long-term care insurance option for employees, The program was abolished as impractical without ever having taken effect.

Consumer Operated and Oriented Plans (CO-OP), member-governed non-profit insurers, could start providing health care coverage, based on a 5-year federal loan. There were 23 CO-OPs at launch in 2013; Health Republic Insurance of New York closed in 2015. As of 2017, only four of the original co-ops were still in operation, including Mountain Health CO-OP.

=== Nutrition labeling requirements ===
Nutrition labeling requirements were to take effect in 2010, but implementation was delayed, and they actually took effect on May 7, 2018.

== Legislative history ==
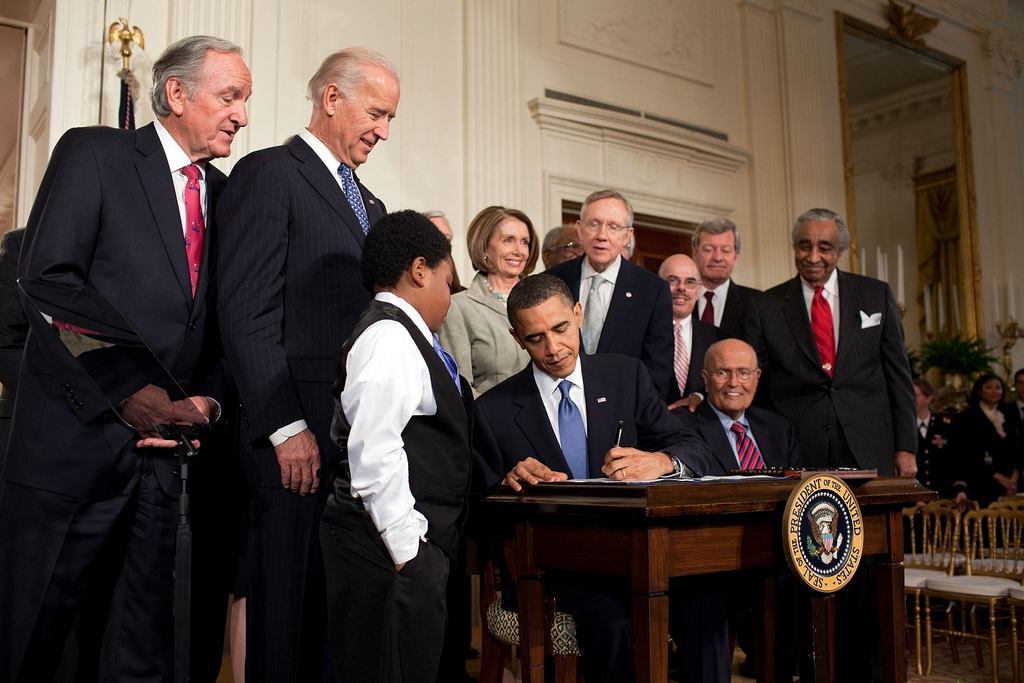
President Obama signs the Patient Protection and Affordable Care Act on March 23, 2010.

ACA followed a long series of unsuccessful attempts by one party or the other to pass major insurance reforms. Innovations were limited to health savings accounts (2003), medical savings accounts (1996) or flexible spending accounts, which increased insurance options, but did not materially expand coverage. Health care was a major factor in multiple elections, but until 2009, neither party had the votes to overcome the other's opposition.

=== Individual mandate ===
The concept of an individual mandate goes back to at least 1989, when The Heritage Foundation, a conservative think-tank, proposed an individual mandate as an alternative to single-payer health care. It was championed for a time by conservative economists and Republican senators as a market-based approach to healthcare reform on the basis of individual responsibility and avoidance of free rider problems. Specifically, because the 1986 Emergency Medical Treatment and Active Labor Act (EMTALA) requires any hospital participating in Medicare (nearly all do) to provide emergency care to anyone who needs it, the government often indirectly bore the cost of those without the ability to pay.

President Bill Clinton proposed a major healthcare reform bill in 1993 that ultimately failed. Clinton negotiated a compromise with the 105th Congress to instead enact the State Children's Health Insurance Program (SCHIP) in 1997. The failed Clinton plan included a mandate for employers to provide health insurance to all employees through a regulated marketplace of health maintenance organizations. Republican senators proposed an alternative that would have required individuals, but not employers, to buy insurance.

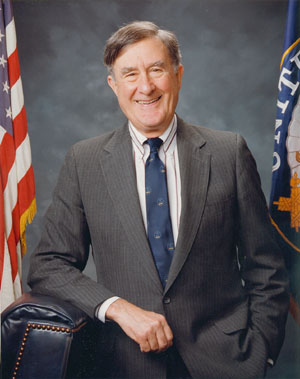
John Chafee

The 1993 Republican Health Equity and Access Reform Today (HEART) Act, contained a "universal coverage" requirement with a penalty for noncompliance—an individual mandate—as well as subsidies to be used in state-based 'purchasing groups'. Advocates included prominent Republican senators such as John Chafee, Orrin Hatch, Chuck Grassley, Bob Bennett and Kit Bond. The 1994 Republican Consumer Choice Health Security Act, initially contained an individual mandate with a penalty provision; however, author Don Nickles subsequently removed the mandate, stating, "government should not compel people to buy health insurance". At the time of these proposals, Republicans did not raise constitutional issues; Mark Pauly, who helped develop a proposal that included an individual mandate for George H. W. Bush, remarked, "I don't remember that being raised at all. The way it was viewed by the Congressional Budget Office in 1994 was, effectively, as a tax."

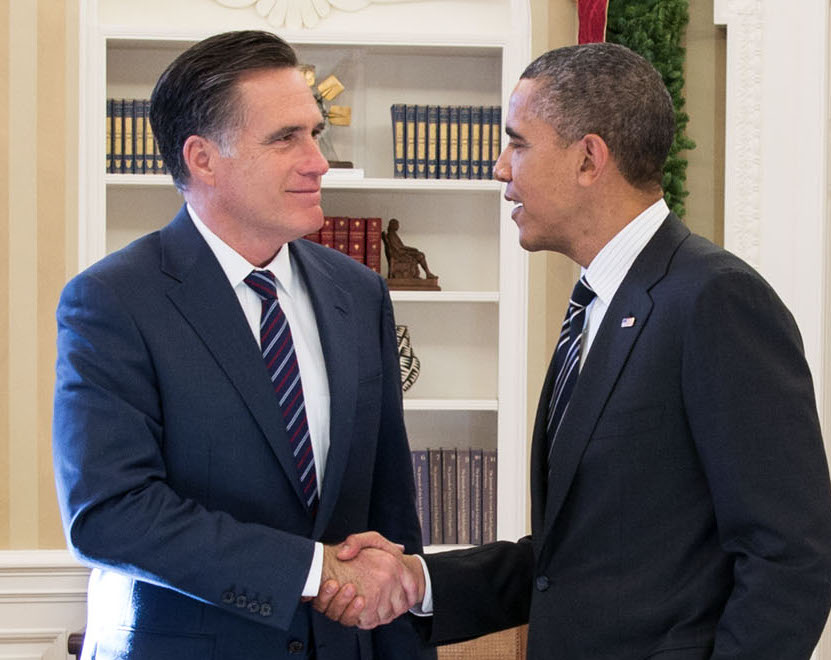
Mitt Romney's Massachusetts went from 90% of its residents insured to 98%, the highest rate in the nation.

In 2006, an insurance expansion bill was enacted at the state level in Massachusetts. The bill contained both an individual mandate and an insurance exchange. Republican Governor Mitt Romney used a line-item veto on some provisions, and the Democratic legislature overrode some of his changes (including the mandate). Romney's implementation of the 'Health Connector' exchange and individual mandate in Massachusetts was at first lauded by Republicans. During Romney's 2008 presidential campaign, Senator Jim DeMint praised Romney's ability to "take some good conservative ideas, like private health insurance, and apply them to the need to have everyone insured". Romney said of the individual mandate: "I'm proud of what we've done. If Massachusetts succeeds in implementing it, then that will be the model for the nation."

In 2007 Republican Senator Bob Bennett and Democratic Senator Ron Wyden introduced the Healthy Americans Act, which featured an individual mandate and state-based, regulated insurance markets called "State Health Help Agencies". The bill attracted bipartisan support, but died in committee. Many of its sponsors and co-sponsors remained in Congress during the 2008 healthcare debate.

By 2008 many Democrats were considering this approach as the basis for healthcare reform. Experts said the legislation that eventually emerged from Congress in 2009 and 2010 bore similarities to the 2007 bill and that it took ideas from the Massachusetts reforms.

=== Academic foundation ===
A driving force behind Obama's healthcare reform was Peter Orszag, Director of the Office of Management and Budget. Obama called Orszag his "healthcare czar" because of his knowledge of healthcare reform. Orszag had previously been director of the Congressional Budget Office, and under his leadership the agency had focused on using cost analysis to create an affordable and effective approach to health care reform. Orszag claimed that healthcare reform became Obama's top agenda item because he wanted it to be his legacy. According to an article by Ryan Lizza in The New Yorker, the core of "the Obama budget is Orszag's belief [in]...a government empowered with research on the most effective medical treatments". Obama bet "his presidency on Orszag's thesis of comparative effectiveness." Orszag's policies were influenced by an article in The Annals of Internal Medicine co-authored by Elliott S. Fisher, David Wennberg and others. The article presented strong evidence based on the co-authors' research that numerous procedures, therapies and tests were being delivered with scant evidence of their medical value. If those procedures and tests could be eliminated, this evidence suggested, medical costs might provide the savings to give healthcare to the uninsured population. After reading a New Yorker article that used the "Dartmouth findings" to compare two counties in Texas with enormous variations in Medicare costs using hard data, Obama directed that his entire staff read it. More than anything else, the Dartmouth data intrigued Obama since it gave him an academic rationale for reshaping medicine.

The concept of comparing the effectiveness of healthcare options based on hard data ("comparative effectiveness" and "evidence-based medicine") was pioneered by John E. Wennberg, founder of The Dartmouth Institute, co-founder of The Foundation for Informed Medical Decision Making and senior advisor to Health Dialog Inc., a venture that he and his researchers created to help insurers implement the Dartmouth findings.

=== Healthcare debate, 2008–10 ===
Healthcare reform was a major topic during the 2008 Democratic presidential primaries. As the race narrowed, attention focused on the plans presented by the two leading candidates, Hillary Clinton and the eventual nominee, Barack Obama. Each candidate proposed a plan to cover the approximately 45 million Americans estimated to not have health insurance at some point each year. Clinton's proposal would have required all Americans to obtain coverage (in effect, an individual mandate), while Obama's proposal provided a subsidy without a mandate.

During the general election, Obama said fixing healthcare would be one of his top four priorities as president. Obama and his opponent, Senator John McCain, both proposed health insurance reforms, though their plans differed. McCain proposed tax credits for health insurance purchased in the individual market, which was estimated to reduce the number of uninsured people by about 2 million by 2018. Obama proposed private and public group insurance, income-based subsidies, consumer protections, and expansions of Medicaid and SCHIP, which was estimated at the time to reduce the number of uninsured people by 33.9 million by 2018 at a higher cost.

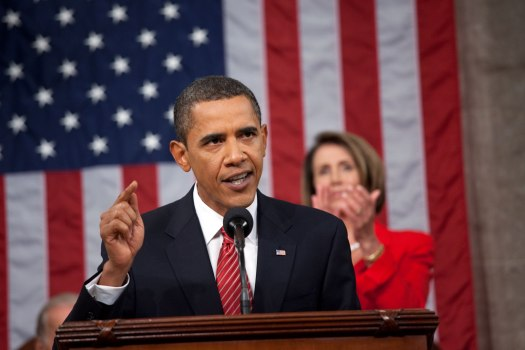
President Obama addressing Congress regarding healthcare reform, September 9, 2009

In February 2009, Obama announced to a joint session of Congress his intent to work with Congress to build a healthcare reform plan. By July, a series of bills were approved by committees within the House of Representatives. On the Senate side, from June to September, the Senate Finance Committee held 31 meetings to develop a proposal. This group—in particular, Democrats Max Baucus, Jeff Bingaman and Kent Conrad, along with Republicans Mike Enzi, Chuck Grassley and Olympia Snowe—met for more than 60 hours, and the principles they discussed, in conjunction with the other committees, became the foundation of a Senate bill.

Congressional Democrats and health policy experts, such as MIT economics professor Jonathan Gruber and David Cutler, argued that guaranteed issue would require both community rating and an individual mandate to ensure that adverse selection or "free riding" would not result in an insurance "death spiral". They chose this approach after concluding that filibuster-proof support in the Senate was not present for more progressive plans such as single-payer. By deliberately drawing on bipartisan ideas—the same basic outline was supported by former Senate Majority Leaders Howard Baker, Bob Dole, Tom Daschle and George J. Mitchell—the bill's drafters hoped to garner the necessary votes.

However, following the incorporation of an individual mandate into the proposal, Republicans threatened to filibuster any bill that contained it. Senate Minority Leader Mitch McConnell, who led the Republican response, concluded Republicans should not support the bill.

Republican senators, including those who had supported earlier proposals with a similar mandate, began to describe the mandate as "unconstitutional". Journalist Ezra Klein wrote in The New Yorker, "a policy that once enjoyed broad support within the Republican Party suddenly faced unified opposition."

The reform debate also attracted focused attention from lobbyists, including pharmaceutical and healthcare insurance company advocacy, to assure continued opposition from all Republicans and even from among more conservative Democrats, who had not fully supported the public option in earlier proposals.

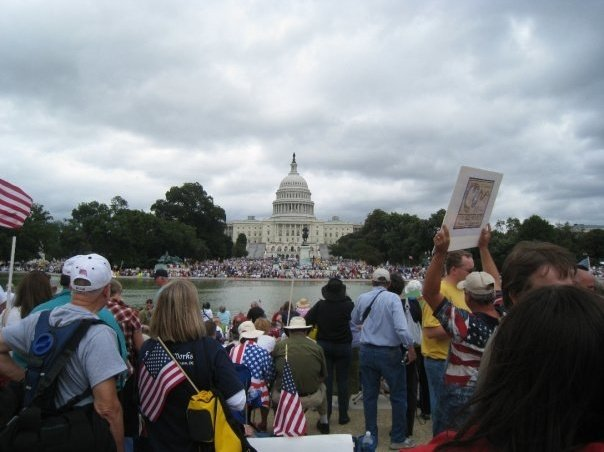
Tea Party protesters at the Taxpayer March on Washington, September 12, 2009

During the August 2009 summer congressional recess, many members went back to their districts and held town hall meetings on the proposals. The nascent Tea Party movement organized protests and many conservative groups and individuals attended the meetings to oppose the proposed reforms. Threats were made against members of Congress over the course of the debate.

In September 2009 Obama delivered another speech to a joint session of Congress supporting the negotiations. On November 7, the House of Representatives passed the Affordable Health Care for America Act on a 220–215 vote and forwarded it to the Senate for passage.

==== Senate ====
The Senate began work on its own proposals while the House was still working. The United States Constitution requires all revenue-related bills to originate in the House. To formally comply with this requirement, the Senate repurposed H.R. 3590, a bill regarding housing tax changes for service members. It had been passed by the House as a revenue-related modification to the Internal Revenue Code. The bill became the Senate's vehicle for its healthcare reform proposal, discarding the bill's original content. The bill ultimately incorporated elements of proposals that were reported favorably by the Senate Health and Finance committees. With the Republican Senate minority vowing to filibuster, 60 votes would be necessary to pass the Senate. At the start of the 111th Congress, Democrats had 58 votes. The Minnesota Senate election was ultimately won by Democrat Al Franken, making 59. Arlen Specter switched to the Democratic party in April 2009, giving them 60 seats, enough to end a filibuster.

Negotiations were undertaken attempting to satisfy moderate Democrats and to bring Republican senators aboard; particular attention was given to Republicans Bennett, Enzi, Grassley and Snowe.

After the Finance Committee vote on October 15, negotiations turned to moderate Democrats. Senate Majority Leader Harry Reid focused on satisfying centrists. The holdouts came down to Joe Lieberman of Connecticut, an independent who caucused with Democrats, and conservative Nebraska Democrat Ben Nelson. Lieberman's demand that the bill not include a public option was met, although supporters won various concessions, including allowing state-based public options such as Vermont's failed Green Mountain Care.

Senate vote by state Democratic yes (58) Independent yes (2) Republican no (39) Republican not voting (1)

The White House and Reid addressed Nelson's concerns during a 13-hour negotiation with two concessions: a compromise on abortion, modifying the language of the bill "to give states the right to prohibit coverage of abortion within their own insurance exchanges", which would require consumers to pay for the procedure out of pocket if the state so decided; and an amendment to offer a higher rate of Medicaid reimbursement for Nebraska. The latter half of the compromise was derisively termed the "Cornhusker Kickback" and was later removed.

On December 23, the Senate voted 60–39 to end debate on the bill: a cloture vote to end the filibuster. The bill then passed, also 60–39, on December 24, 2009, with all Democrats and two independents voting for it, and all Republicans against (except Jim Bunning, who did not vote). The bill was endorsed by the American Medical Association and AARP.

On January 19, 2010, Massachusetts Republican Scott Brown was elected to the Senate in a special election to seat of the recently deceased Ted Kennedy. Since September 2009, the seat had been held on an interim basis by Democrat Paul G. Kirk, who gave the bill its 60th vote on December 24, 2009. Brown campaigned on giving the Republican minority the 41st vote needed to sustain Republican filibusters. Additionally, the symbolic importance of losing Kennedy's traditionally Democratic Massachusetts seat made many Congressional Democrats concerned about the bill's political cost.

==== House ====
House vote by congressional district Democratic yes (219) Democratic no (34) Republican no (178) No representative seated (4)

House vote by agreement. Yes (219) No (212) No representative seated (4) House vote by party Democratic yes (219) Democratic no (34) Republican no (178) No representative seated (4)

With Democrats no longer able to get the 60 votes to break a filibuster in the Senate, White House Chief of Staff Rahm Emanuel argued that Democrats should scale back to a less ambitious bill, but House Speaker Nancy Pelosi pushed back, dismissing more moderate reform as "Kiddie Care".

Obama remained insistent on comprehensive reform. The news that Anthem in California intended to raise premium rates for its patients by as much as 39% gave him new evidence of the need for reform. On February 22, he laid out a "Senate-leaning" proposal to consolidate the bills. He held a meeting with both parties' leaders on February 25. The Democrats decided the House would pass the Senate's bill, to avoid another Senate vote.

House Democrats had expected to be able to negotiate changes in a House–Senate conference before passing a final bill. Since any bill that emerged from conference that differed from the Senate bill would have to pass the Senate over another Republican filibuster, most House Democrats agreed to pass the Senate bill on condition that it be amended by a subsequent bill. They drafted the Health Care and Education Reconciliation Act, which could be passed by the reconciliation process.

Per the Congressional Budget Act of 1974, reconciliation cannot be subject to a filibuster. But reconciliation is limited to budget changes, which is why the procedure was not used to pass ACA in the first place; the bill had inherently non-budgetary regulations. Although the already-passed Senate bill could not have been passed by reconciliation, most of House Democrats' demands were budgetary: "these changes—higher subsidy levels, different kinds of taxes to pay for them, nixing the Nebraska Medicaid deal—mainly involve taxes and spending. In other words, they're exactly the kinds of policies that are well-suited for reconciliation."

The remaining obstacle was a pivotal group of pro-life Democrats led by Bart Stupak who were initially reluctant to support the bill. The group found the possibility of federal funding for abortion significant enough to warrant opposition. The Senate bill had not included language that satisfied their concerns, but they could not address abortion in the reconciliation bill as it would be non-budgetary. Instead, Obama issued Executive Order 13535, reaffirming the principles in the Hyde Amendment to continue banning the use of federal funds for abortion. This won the support of Stupak and members of his group and assured the bill's passage. The House passed the Senate bill with a 219–212 vote on March 21, 2010, with 34 Democrats and all 178 Republicans voting against it. It passed the second bill, by 220–211, the same day (with the Senate passing this bill via reconciliation by 56-43 a few days later). The day after the passage of ACA, March 22, Republicans introduced legislation to repeal it. Obama signed ACA into law on March 23, 2010.

=== Post-enactment ===
Since passage, Republicans have voted to repeal all or parts of the Affordable Care Act more than sixty times.

The Tax Cuts and Jobs Act of 2017 eliminated the fine for violating the individual mandate, starting in 2019. (The requirement itself is still in effect.) In 2019 Congress repealed the so-called "Cadillac" tax on health insurance benefits, an excise tax on medical devices, and the Health Insurance Tax.

The American Rescue Plan Act of 2021, enacted during the COVID-19 pandemic in the United States, expanded subsidies for marketplace health plans. A continuation of these subsidies was introduced as part of the Inflation Reduction Act of 2022.

On December 11, 2025, 48 Republican senators voted to block a bill to extend the subsidies. The (51—48) vote was less than the 60 votes needed to proceed to extend the subsidies. On New Year's Day 2026, the Inflation Reduction Act's enhanced subsidies expired.

== Impact ==
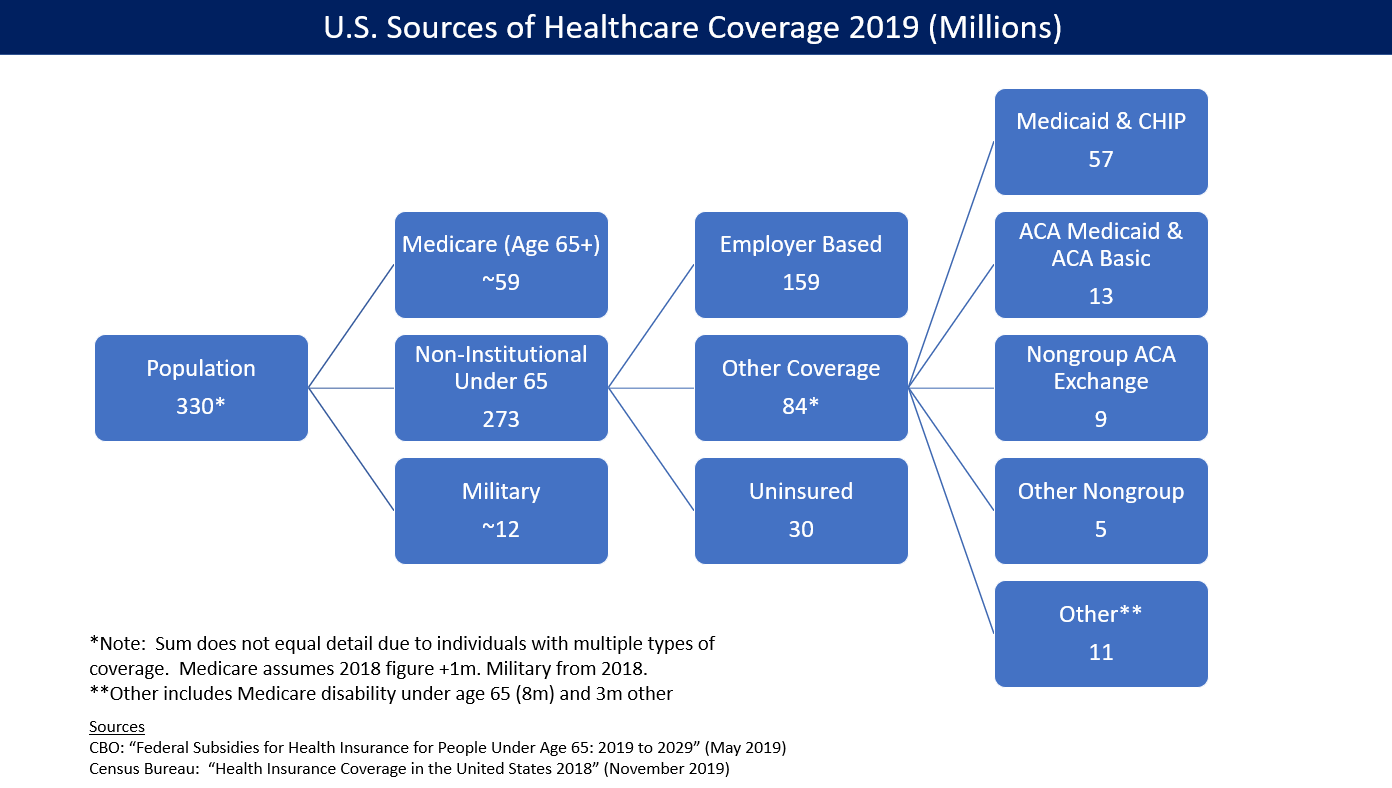
U.S. health insurance coverage by source in 2016. CBO estimated ACA/Obamacare was responsible for 23 million persons covered via exchanges and Medicaid expansion.

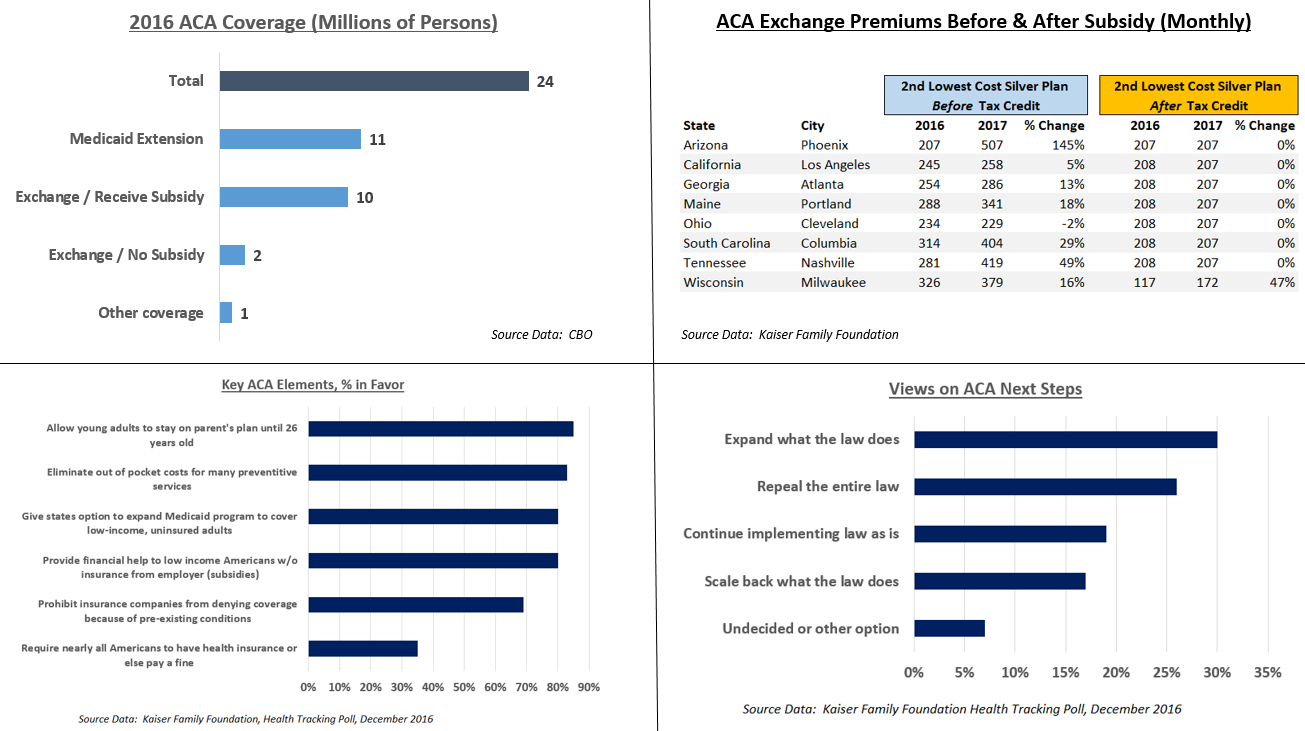
This chart illustrates several aspects of the Affordable Care Act, including number of persons covered, cost before and after subsidies, and public opinion.

=== Coverage ===
The law caused a significant reduction in the number and percentage of people without health insurance. The CDC reported that the percentage of people without health insurance fell from 16.0% in 2010 to 8.9% from January to June 2016. The uninsured rate dropped in every congressional district in the U.S. from 2013 to 2015. The Congressional Budget Office reported in March 2016 that approximately 12 million people were covered by the exchanges (10 million of whom received subsidies) and 11 million added to Medicaid. Another million were covered by ACA's "Basic Health Program", for a total of 24 million. CBO estimated that ACA would reduce the net number of uninsured by 22 million in 2016, using a slightly different computation for the above figures totaling ACA coverage of 26 million, less 4 million for reductions in "employment-based coverage" and "non-group and other coverage".

The U.S. Department of Health and Human Services (HHS) estimated that 20.0 million adults (aged 18–64) gained healthcare coverage via ACA as of February 2016; similarly, the Urban Institute found in 2016 that 19.2 million non-elderly Americans gained health insurance coverage from 2010 to 2015. In 2016, CBO estimated the uninsured at approximately 27 million people, or around 10% of the population or 7–8% excluding undocumented immigrants.

States that expanded Medicaid had a 7.3% uninsured rate on average in the first quarter of 2016, while those that did not had a 14.1% uninsured rate, among adults aged 18–64. As of December 2016 32 states (including Washington DC) had adopted the Medicaid extension.

A 2017 study found that the ACA reduced socioeconomic disparities in health care access.

The Affordable Care Act reduced the percent of Americans between 18 and 64 who were uninsured from 22.3 percent in 2010 to 12.4 percent in 2016. About 21 million more people have coverage ten years after the enactment of the ACA. Ten years after its enactment studies showed that the ACA also had a positive effect on health and caused a reduction in mortality.

=== Taxes ===
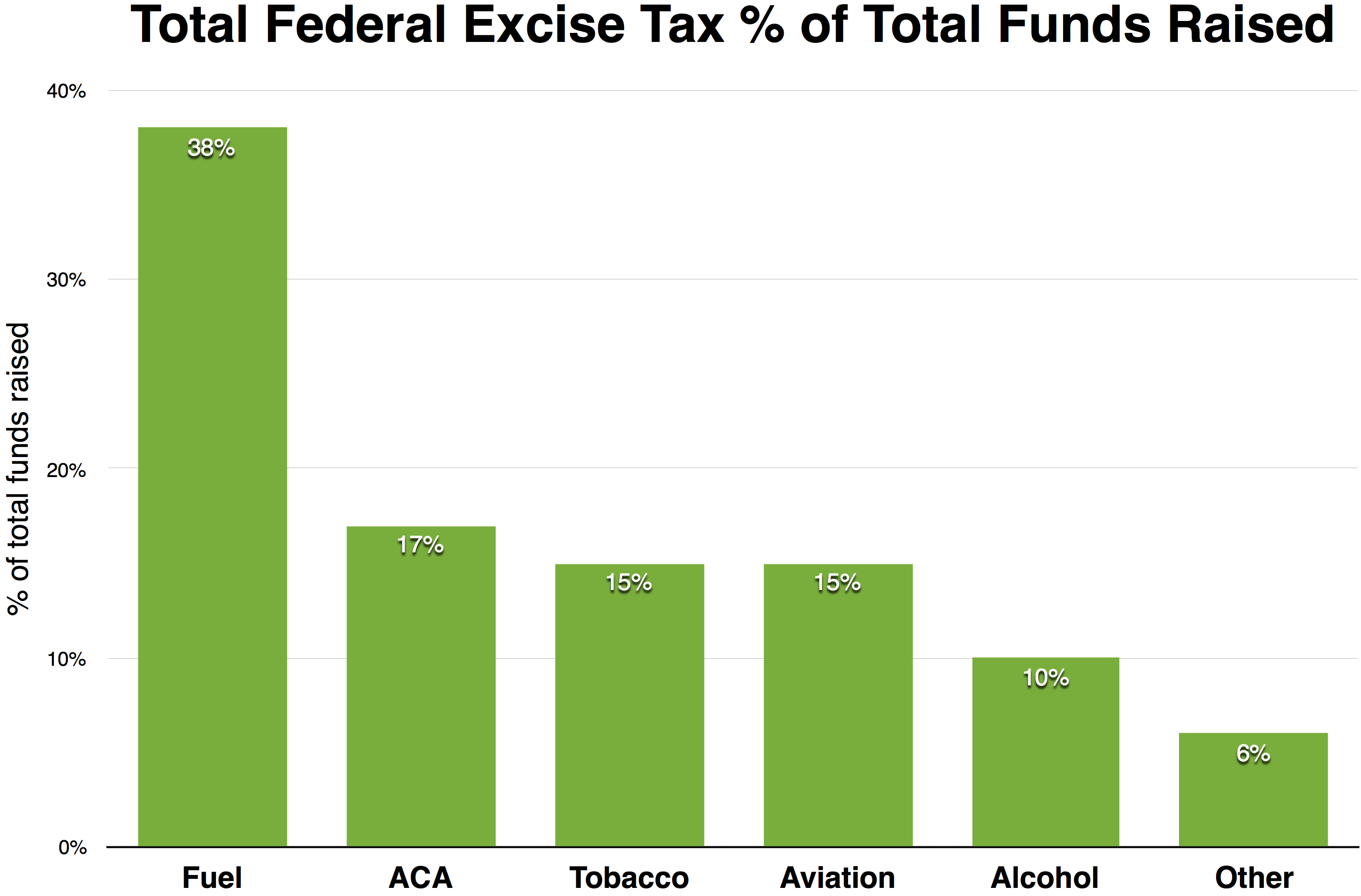
Excise taxes percentage 2015

Excise taxes from the Affordable Care Act raised $16.3 billion in fiscal year 2015. $11.3 billion came from an excise tax placed directly on health insurers based on their market share. Annual excise taxes totaling $3 billion were levied on importers and manufacturers of prescription drugs.

The Individual mandate tax was $695 per individual or $2,085 per family at a minimum, reaching as high as 2.5% of household income (whichever was higher). The tax was set to $0 beginning in 2019.

In the fiscal year 2018, the individual and employer mandates yielded $4 billion each. Excise taxes on insurers and drug makers added $18 billion. Income tax surcharges produced 437 billion.

ACA reduced income inequality measured after taxes, due to the income tax surcharges and subsidies. CBO estimated that subsidies paid under the law in 2016 averaged $4,240 per person for 10 million individuals receiving them, roughly $42 billion. The tax subsidy for the employer market, was approximately $1,700 per person in 2016, or $266 billion total.

=== Insurance exchanges ===
As of August 2016, 15 states operated their own health insurance marketplace. Other states either used the federal exchange, or operated in partnership with or supported by the federal government. By 2019, 12 states and Washington DC operated their own exchanges.

=== Medicaid expansion in practice ===
ACA Medicaid expansion by state. Not adopted Adopted Implemented

As of December 2019, 37 states (including Washington DC) had adopted the Medicaid extension. Those states that expanded Medicaid had a 7.3% uninsured rate on average in the first quarter of 2016, while the others had a 14.1% uninsured rate, among adults aged 18 to 64. Following the Supreme Court ruling in 2012, which held that states would not lose Medicaid funding if they did not expand Medicaid under ACA, several states rejected the option. Over half the national uninsured population lived in those states.

The Centers for Medicare and Medicaid Services (CMS) estimated that the cost of expansion was $6,366 per person for 2015, about 49 percent above previous estimates. An estimated 9 to 10 million people had gained Medicaid coverage, mostly low-income adults. The Kaiser Family Foundation estimated in October 2015 that 3.1 million additional people were not covered because of states that rejected the Medicaid expansion.

In many states income thresholds were significantly below 133% of the poverty line. Many states did not make Medicaid available to childless adults at any income level. Because subsidies on exchange insurance plans were not available to those below the poverty line, such individuals had no new options. For example, in Kansas, where only non-disabled adults with children and with an income below 32% of the poverty line were eligible for Medicaid, those with incomes from 32% to 100% of the poverty level ($6,250 to $19,530 for a family of three) were ineligible for both Medicaid and federal subsidies to buy insurance. Absent children, non-disabled adults were not eligible for Medicaid there.

Studies of the impact of Medicaid expansion rejections calculated that up to 6.4 million people would have too much income for Medicaid but not qualify for exchange subsidies. Several states argued that they could not afford the 10% contribution in 2020. Some studies suggested rejecting the expansion would cost more due to increased spending on uncompensated emergency care that otherwise would have been partially paid for by Medicaid coverage,

A 2016 study found that residents of Kentucky and Arkansas, which both expanded Medicaid, were more likely to receive health care services and less likely to incur emergency room costs or have trouble paying their medical bills. Residents of Texas, which did not accept the Medicaid expansion, did not see a similar improvement during the same period. Kentucky opted for increased managed care, while Arkansas subsidized private insurance. Later Arkansas and Kentucky governors proposed reducing or modifying their programs. From 2013 to 2015, the uninsured rate dropped from 42% to 14% in Arkansas and from 40% to 9% in Kentucky, compared with 39% to 32% in Texas.

A 2016 DHHS study found that states that expanded Medicaid had lower premiums on exchange policies, because they had fewer low-income enrollees, whose health on average is worse than that of those with higher income.

In September 2019, the Census Bureau reported that states that expanded Medicaid under the ACA had considerably lower uninsured rates than states that did not. For example, for adults between 100% and 399% of poverty level, the uninsured rate in 2018 was 12.7% in expansion states and 21.2% in non-expansion states. Of the 14 states with uninsured rates of 10% or greater, 11 had not expanded Medicaid. The drop in uninsured rates due to expanded Medicaid has broadened access to care among low-income adults, with post-ACA studies indicating an improvement in affordability, access to doctors, and usual sources of care.

A study using national data from the Health Reform Monitoring Survey determined that unmet need due to cost and inability to pay medical bills significantly decreased among low-income (up to 138% FPL) and moderate-income (139-199% FPL) adults, with unmet need due to cost decreasing by approximately 11 percentage points among low-income adults by the second enrollment period. Importantly, issues with cost-related unmet medical needs, skipped medications, paying medical bills, and annual out-of-pocket spending have been significantly reduced among low-income adults in Medicaid expansion states compared to non-expansion states.

As well, expanded Medicaid has led to a 6.6% increase in physician visits by low-income adults, as well as increased usage of preventative care such as dental visits and cancer screenings among childless, low-income adults. Improved health care coverage due to Medicaid expansion has been found in a variety of patient populations, such as adults with mental and substance use disorders, trauma patients, cancer patients, and people living with HIV. Compared to 2011–13, in 2014 there was a 5.4 percentage point reduction in the uninsured rate of adults with mental disorders (from 21.3% to 15.9%) and a 5.1 percentage point reduction in the uninsured rate of adults with substance use disorders (from 25.9% to 20.8%); with increases in coverage occurring primarily through Medicaid. Use of mental health treatment increased by 2.1 percentage points, from 43% to 45.1%.

Among trauma patients nationwide, the uninsured rate has decreased by approximately 50%. Adult trauma patients in expansion states experienced a 13.7 percentage point reduction in uninsured rates compared to adult trauma patients in non-expansion states, and an accompanying 7.4 percentage point increase in discharge to rehabilitation. Following Medicaid expansion and dependent coverage expansion, young adults hospitalized for acute traumatic injury in Maryland experienced a 60% increase in rehabilitation, 25% reduction in mortality, and a 29.8% reduction in failure-to-rescue. Medicaid expansion's swift impact on cancer patients was demonstrated in a study using the National Cancer Institute's Surveillance, Epidemiology, and End Results (SEER) program that evaluated more than 850,000 patients diagnosed with breast, lung, colorectal, prostate cancer, or thyroid cancer from 2010 to 2014. The study found that a cancer diagnosis in 2014 was associated with a 1.9 percentage-point absolute and 33.5% relative decrease in uninsured rates compared to a diagnosis made between 2010 and 2013. Another study, using Surveillance, Epidemiology, and End Results (SEER) Program data from 2010 to 2014, found that Medicaid expansion was associated with a 6.4% net increase in early stage (in situ, local, or regional) diagnoses of all cancers combined.

Data from the Centers for Disease and Prevention's (CDC) Medical Monitoring Project demonstrated that between 2009 and 2012, approximately 18% of people living with HIV (PLWH) who were actively receiving HIV treatment were uninsured and that at least 40% of HIV-infected adults receiving treatment were insured through Medicaid or Medicare, programs they qualified for only once their disease was advanced enough to be covered as a disability under Social Security. Expanded Medicaid coverage of PLWH has been positively associated with health outcomes such as viral suppression, retention of care, hospitalization rates, and morbidity at the time of hospitalization. An analysis of Behavioral Risk Factor Surveillance System (BRFSS) survey data found a 2.8% annual increase in viral suppression rates among all PLWH from 2010 to 2015 due to Medicaid expansion. As an early adopter of Medicaid expansion, Massachusetts found a 65% rate of viral suppression among all PLWH and an 85% rate among those retained in healthcare in 2014, both substantially higher than the national average.

An analysis of hospital discharge data from 2012 to 2014 in four Medicaid expansion states and two non-expansion states revealed hospitalizations of uninsured PLWH fell from 13.7% to 5.5% in the four expansion states and rose from 14.5% to 15.7% in the two non-expansion states. Importantly, uninsured PLWH were 40% more likely to die in the hospital than insured PLWH. Other notable health outcomes associated with Medicaid expansion include improved glucose monitoring rates for patients with diabetes, better hypertension control, and reduced rates of major post-operative morbidity.

A July 2019 study by the National Bureau of Economic Research (NBER) indicated that states enacting Medicaid expansion exhibited statistically significant reductions in mortality rates. From that study, states that took Medicaid expansion "saved the lives of at least 19,200 adults aged 55 to 64 over the four-year period from 2014 to 2017." Further, 15,600 older adults died prematurely in the states that did not enact Medicaid expansion in those years according to the NBER research. "The lifesaving impacts of Medicaid expansion are large: an estimated 39 to 64 percent reduction in annual mortality rates for older adults gaining coverage."

Due to many states' failure to expand, many Democrats co-sponsored the proposed 2021 Cover Now Act that would allow county and municipal governments to fund Medicaid expansion.

==== Gaps in expansion ====
Despite the significant increase in access to insurance coverage and healthcare services across the board, the ACA's Medicaid expansion has not fully addressed problems of economic equity. Critics argue that Medicaid expansion has not reduced cost-sharing by a significant margin, as the amount households paid out of pocket for healthcare over the past ten years (in the form of deductibles, co-payments, etc.) rose by 77%. Additionally, 30% of providers deny Medicaid patients, which affects the accessibility of quality care. This increase in denial may be in part because providers receive 62 cents from Medicaid for every dollar received from private insurers. Studies on insurance rates show that economic inequality still persists: a significantly higher proportion of those with income greater than 100% but less than 200% of the federal poverty level were uninsured from 2010 to 2015 than of those with income greater than 200% of the federal poverty level. This is exacerbated by the 2012 Supreme Court decision allowing states to opt out of Medicaid, since many of the states that have opted out have more vulnerable populations, with large numbers of minorities or low-income people.

Medicaid patients have also reported receiving "second-class" treatment compared to privately insured patients, with longer wait times and lower quality of care.

==== Medicaid expansion by state ====
State or territory	Status of expansion	Date of expansion	Health insurance marketplace	Notes
Alabama	No expansion	N/A	HealthCare.gov	
Alaska	In effect	September 1, 2015	HealthCare.gov	
Arizona	In effect	January 1, 2014	HealthCare.gov	
Arkansas	In effect	January 1, 2014	Arkansas Health Connector, HealthCare.gov	State implemented expansion through a "private option" under a Section 1115 waiver through the Arkansas Health Care Independence Program (HCIP). Work requirement added in 2018 through Arkansas Works. Work requirement removed in 2021. Currently only state using "private option" as of 2022.
California	In effect	January 1, 2014	Covered California, HealthCare.gov	
Colorado	In effect	January 1, 2014	Connect for Health Colorado, HealthCare.gov	
Connecticut	In effect	January 1, 2014	Access Health CT, HealthCare.gov	
Delaware	In effect	January 1, 2014	HealthCare.gov	
Florida	No expansion	N/A	HealthCare.gov	
Georgia	No expansion	N/A	HealthCare.gov	
Hawaii	In effect	January 1, 2014	Hawaii Health Connector, HealthCare.gov	
Idaho	In effect	January 1, 2020	Your Health Idaho, HealthCare.gov	Enacted through 2018 Idaho Proposition 2.
Illinois	In effect	January 1, 2014	Illinois Health Benefits Exchange, HealthCare.gov	
Indiana	In effect	February 1, 2015	HealthCare.gov	
Iowa	In effect	January 1, 2014	HealthCare.gov	
Kansas	No expansion	N/A	HealthCare.gov	
Kentucky	In effect	January 1, 2014	Kynect, HealthCare.gov	Enacted through gubernatorial executive order
Louisiana	In effect	July 1, 2016	HealthCare.gov	Enacted through gubernatorial executive order
Maine	In effect	January 10, 2019	HealthCare.gov	Enacted through 2017 Maine Question 2, but implementation was delayed due to gubernatorial opposition. coverage retroactive to 7/2/2018.
Maryland	In effect	January 1, 2014	Maryland Health Connection, HealthCare.gov	
Massachusetts	In effect	January 1, 2014	Massachusetts Health Insurance Connector, HealthCare.gov	
Michigan	In effect	April 1, 2014	HealthCare.gov	
Minnesota	In effect	January 1, 2014	MNsure, HealthCare.gov	
Mississippi	No expansion	N/A	HealthCare.gov	
Missouri	In effect	October 1, 2021	HealthCare.gov	Enacted through 2020 Missouri Amendment 2, but applications were denied until October 1, 2021, due to legislative opposition to the amendment. coverage retroactive to 7/1/2021.
Montana	In effect	January 1, 2016	HealthCare.gov	Legislature enacted expansion with a work requirement; work requirement was due to take effect in January 2020 but never received federal approval. Current expansion is extended to June 2025.
Nebraska	In effect	October 1, 2020	HealthCare.gov	enacted through 2018 Nebraska Initiative 427.
Nevada	In effect	January 1, 2014	Nevada Health Link, HealthCare.gov	
New Hampshire	In effect	August 15, 2014	HealthCare.gov	
New Jersey	In effect	January 1, 2014	HealthCare.gov	
New Mexico	In effect	January 1, 2014	New Mexico Health Insurance Exchange, HealthCare.gov	
New York	In effect	January 1, 2014	NY State of Health, HealthCare.gov	
North Dakota	In effect	January 1, 2014	HealthCare.gov	
North Carolina	In effect	December 1, 2023	HealthCare.gov	
Ohio	In effect	January 1, 2014	HealthCare.gov	
Oklahoma	In effect	July 1, 2021	HealthCare.gov	Enacted through 2020 Oklahoma State Question 802.
Oregon	In effect	January 1, 2014	Cover Oregon (2012–2015), HealthCare.gov	
Pennsylvania	In effect	January 1, 2015	Pennie, HealthCare.gov	
Rhode Island	In effect	January 1, 2014	HealthSource RI, HealthCare.gov	
South Carolina	No expansion	N/A	HealthCare.gov	
South Dakota	No expansion	N/A	HealthCare.gov	
Tennessee	No expansion	N/A	HealthCare.gov	
Texas	No expansion	N/A	HealthCare.gov	
Utah	In effect	January 1, 2020	HealthCare.gov	Enacted through 2018 Utah Proposition 3, but subsequently scaled back through legislative action to enforce a Section 1115 waiver for eligibility.
Vermont	In effect	January 1, 2014	Vermont Health Connect, HealthCare.gov	
Virginia	In effect	January 1, 2019	HealthCare.gov	
Washington	In effect	January 1, 2014	Washington Healthplanfinder, HealthCare.gov	
Washington, D.C.	In effect		DC Health Link, HealthCare.gov	
West Virginia	In effect	January 1, 2014	HealthCare.gov	
Wisconsin	No expansion	N/A	HealthCare.gov	
Wyoming	No expansion	N/A	HealthCare.gov	

=== Insurance costs ===
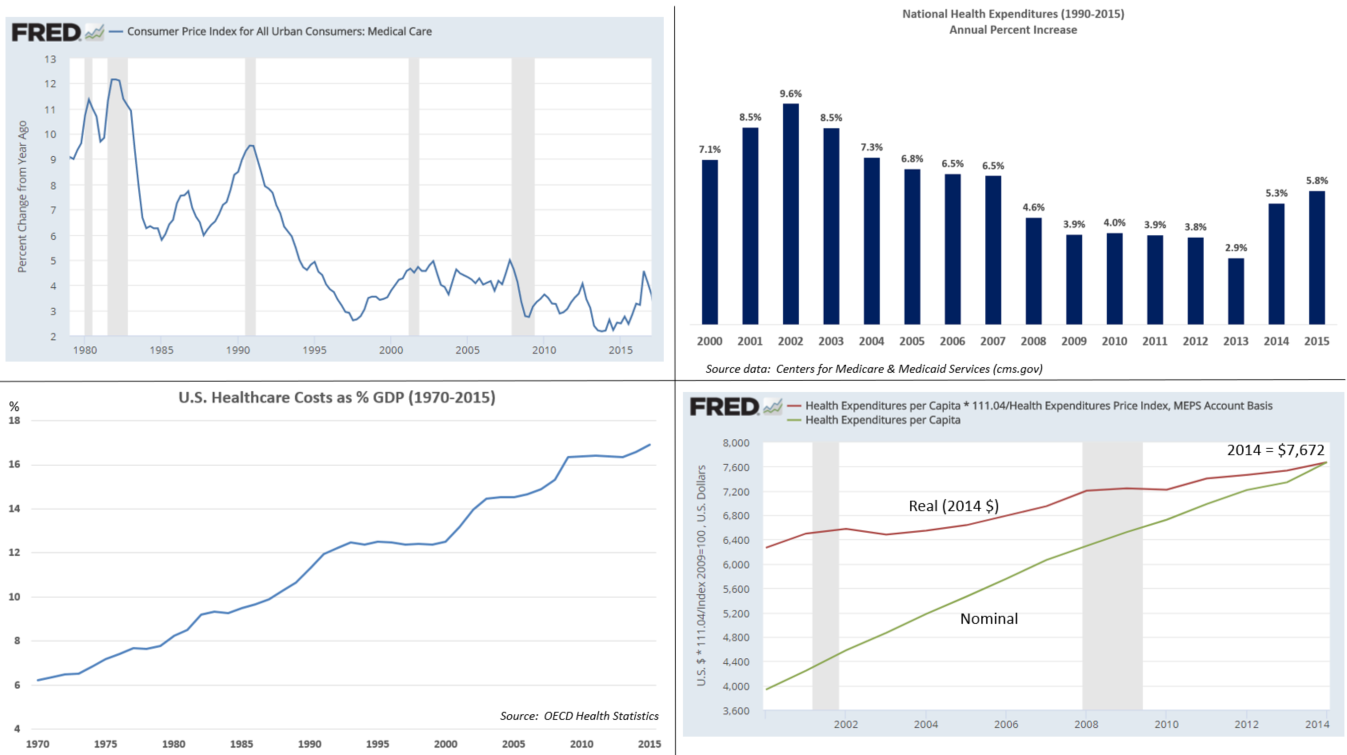

National health care expenditures rose faster than national income both before (2009–2013: 3.73%) and after (2014–2018: 4.82%) ACA's major provisions took effect. Premium prices rose considerably before and after. For example, a study published in 2016 found that the average requested 2017 premium increase among 40-year-old non-smokers was about 9%, although Blue Cross Blue Shield proposed increases of 40% in Alabama and 60% in Texas. However, some or all these costs were offset by tax credits. For example, the Kaiser Family Foundation reported that for the second-lowest cost "Silver plan", a 40-year old non-smoker making $30,000 per year would pay effectively the same amount in 2017 as they did in 2016 (about $208/month) after the tax credit, despite a large increase in the list price. This was consistent nationally. In other words, the subsidies increased along with the premium price, fully offsetting the increases for subsidy-eligible enrollees.

Premium cost increases in the employer market moderated after 2009. For example, healthcare premiums for those covered by employers rose by 69% from 2000 to 2005, but only 27% from 2010 to 2015, with only a 3% increase from 2015 to 2016. From 2008 to 2010 (before passage of ACA) health insurance premiums rose by an average of 10% per year.

Several studies found that the 2008 financial crisis and accompanying Great Recession could not account for the entirety of the slowdown and that structural changes likely shared at least partial credit. A 2013 study estimated that changes to the health system had been responsible for about a quarter of the recent reduction in inflation. Paul Krawzak claimed that even if cost controls succeed in reducing the amount spent on healthcare, such efforts on their own may be insufficient to outweigh the long-term burden placed by demographic changes, particularly the growth of the population on Medicare.

In a 2016 review, Obama claimed that from 2010 through 2014 mean annual growth in real per-enrollee Medicare spending was negative, down from a mean of 4.7% per year from 2000 through 2005 and 2.4% per year from 2006 to 2010; similarly, mean real per-enrollee growth in private insurance spending was 1.1% per year over the period, compared with a mean of 6.5% from 2000 through 2005 and 3.4% from 2005 to 2010.

==== Deductibles and co-payments ====
A contributing factor to premium cost moderation was that the insured faced higher deductibles, copayments and out-of-pocket maximums. In addition, many employees chose to combine a health savings account with higher deductible plans, making the net impact of ACA difficult to determine precisely.

For the group market (employer insurance), a 2016 survey found that:

- Deductibles grew 63% from 2011 to 2016, while premiums increased 19% and worker earnings grew by 11%.
- In 2016, 4 in 5 workers had an insurance deductible, which averaged $1,478. For firms with less than 200 employees, the deductible averaged $2,069.
- The percentage of workers with a deductible of at least $1,000 grew from 10% in 2006 to 51% in 2016. The 2016 figure dropped to 38% after taking employer contributions into account.

For the non-group market, of which two-thirds are covered by ACA exchanges, a survey of 2015 data found that:

- 49% had individual deductibles of at least $1,500 ($3,000 for family), up from 36% in 2014.
- Many exchange enrollees qualify for cost-sharing subsidies that reduce their net deductible.
- While about 75% of enrollees were "very satisfied" or "somewhat satisfied" with their choice of doctors and hospitals, only 50% had such satisfaction with their annual deductible.
- While 52% of those covered by ACA exchanges felt "well protected" by their insurance, in the group market 63% felt that way.

=== Health outcomes ===
According to a 2014 study, ACA likely prevented an estimated 50,000 preventable patient deaths from 2010 to 2013. Himmelstein and Woolhandler wrote in January 2017 that a rollback of ACA's Medicaid expansion alone would cause an estimated 43,956 deaths annually.

According to the Kaiser Foundation, expanding Medicaid in the remaining states would cover up to 4.5 million persons. A 2021 study found a significant decline in mortality rates in the states that opted in to the Medicaid expansion program compared with those states that did not do so. The study reported that states decisions' not to expand Medicaid resulted in approximately 15,600 excess deaths from 2014 through 2017.

Dependent Coverage Expansion (DCE) under the ACA has had a demonstrable effect on various health metrics of young adults, a group with a historically low level of insurance coverage and utilization of care. Numerous studies have shown the target age group gained private health insurance relative to an older group after the policy was implemented, with an accompanying improvement in having a usual source of care, reduction in out-of-pocket costs of high-end medical expenditures, reduction in frequency of Emergency Department visits, 3.5% increase in hospitalizations and 9% increase in hospitalizations with a psychiatric diagnosis, 5.3% increase in utilizing specialty mental health care by those with a probable mental illness, 4% increase in reporting excellent mental health, and a 1.5-6.2% increase in reporting excellent physical health. Studies have also found that DCE was associated with improvements in cancer prevention, detection, and treatment among young adult patients. A study of 10,010 women aged 18–26 identified through the 2008-12 National Health Interview Survey found that the likelihood of HPV vaccination initiation and completion increased by 7.7 and 5.8 percentage points respectively when comparing before and after October 1, 2010. Another study using National Cancer Database (NCDB) data from 2007 to 2012 found a 5.5 percentage point decrease in late-stage (stages III/IV) cervical cancer diagnosis for women aged 21–25 after DCE, and an overall decrease of 7.3 percentage points in late-stage diagnosis compared to those aged 26–34. A study using SEER Program data from 2007 to 2012 found a 2.7 percentage point increase in diagnosis at stage I disease for patients aged 19–25 compared with those aged 26–34 for all cancers combined. Studies focusing on cancer treatment after DCE found a 12.8 percentage point increase in the receipt of fertility-sparing treatment among cervical cancer patients aged 21–25 and an overall increase of 13.4 percentage points compared to those aged 26–34, as well as an increased likelihood that patients aged 19–25 with stage IIB-IIIC colorectal cancer receive timely adjuvant chemotherapy compared to those aged 27–34.

Two 2018 JAMA studies found the Hospital Readmissions Reduction Program (HRRP) was associated with increased post-discharge mortality for patients hospitalized for heart failure and pneumonia. A 2019 JAMA study found that ACA decreased emergency department and hospital use by uninsured individuals. Several studies have indicated that increased 30-day, 90-day, and 1-year post-discharge mortality of heart failure patients can be attributed to "gaming the system" through inappropriate triage systems in emergency departments, use of observation stays when admissions are warranted, and delay of readmission beyond the 30th day post-discharge, strategies that can reduce readmission rates at the expense of quality of care and patient survival. The HRRP was also shown to disproportionately penalize safety-net hospitals that predominately serve low-income patients. A 2020 study by Treasury Department economists in the Quarterly Journal of Economics using a randomized controlled trial (the IRS sent letters to some taxpayers noting that they had paid a fine for not signing up for health insurance but not to other taxpayers) found that over two years, obtaining health insurance reduced mortality by 12 percent. The study concluded that the letters, sent to 3.9 million people, may have saved 700 lives.

A 2020 JAMA study found that Medicare expansion under the ACA was associated with reduced incidence of advanced-stage breast cancer, indicating that Medicaid accessibility led to early detection of breast cancer and higher survival rates. Recent studies have also attributed to Medicaid expansion an increase in use of smoking cessation medications, cervical cancer screening, and colonoscopy, as well as an increase in the percentage of early-stage diagnosis of all cancers and the rate of cancer surgery for low-income patients. These studies include a 2.1% increase in the probability of smoking cessation in Medicaid expansion states compared to non-expansion states, a 24% increase in smoking cessation medication use due to increased Medicaid-financed smoking cessation prescriptions, a 27.7% increase in the rate of colorectal cancer screening in Kentucky following Medicaid expansion with an accompanying improvement in colorectal cancer survival, and a 3.4% increase in cancer incidence following Medicaid expansion that was attributed to an increase in early-stage diagnoses.

Transition-of-care interventions and Alternative Payment Models under the ACA have also shown promise in improving health outcomes. Post-discharge provider appointment and telephone follow-up interventions have been shown to reduce 30-day readmission rates among general medical-surgical inpatients. Reductions in 60, 90, and 180 post-discharge day readmission rates due to transition-of-care interventions have also been demonstrated, and a reduction in 30-day mortality has been suggested. Total joint arthroplasty bundles as part of the Bundled Payments for Care Improvement initiative have been shown to reduce discharge to inpatient rehabilitation facilities and post-acute care facilities, decrease hospital length of stay by 18% without sacrificing quality of care, and reduce the rate of total joint arthroplasty readmissions, half of which were due to surgical complications. The Hospital Value-Based Purchasing Program in Medicaid has also shown the potential to improve health outcomes, with early studies reporting positive and significant effects on total patient experience score, 30-day readmission rates, incidences of pneumonia and pressure ulcers, and 30-day mortality rates for pneumonia. The patient-centered medical home (PCMH) payment and care model, a team-based approach to population health management that risk-stratifies patients and provides focused care management and outreach to high-risk patients, has been shown to improve diabetes outcomes. A widespread PCMH demonstration program focusing on diabetes, known as the Chronic Care Initiative in the Commonwealth of Pennsylvania, found statistically significant improvements in A1C testing, LDL-C testing, nephropathy screening and monitoring, and eye examinations, with an accompanying reduction in all-cause emergency department visits, ambulatory care-sensitive emergency department visits, ambulatory visits to specialists, and a higher rate of ambulatory visits to primary care providers. The ACA overall has improved coverage and care of diabetes, with a significant portion of the 3.5 million uninsured US adults aged 18–64 with diabetes in 2009-10 likely gaining coverage and benefits such as closure of the Medicaid Part D coverage gap for insulin. 2.3 million of the approximately 4.6 million people aged 18–64 with undiagnosed diabetes in 2009–2010 may also have gained access to zero-cost preventative care due to section 2713 of the ACA, which prohibits cost sharing for United States Preventive Services Taskforce grade A or B recommended services, such as diabetes screenings.

=== Distributional impact ===
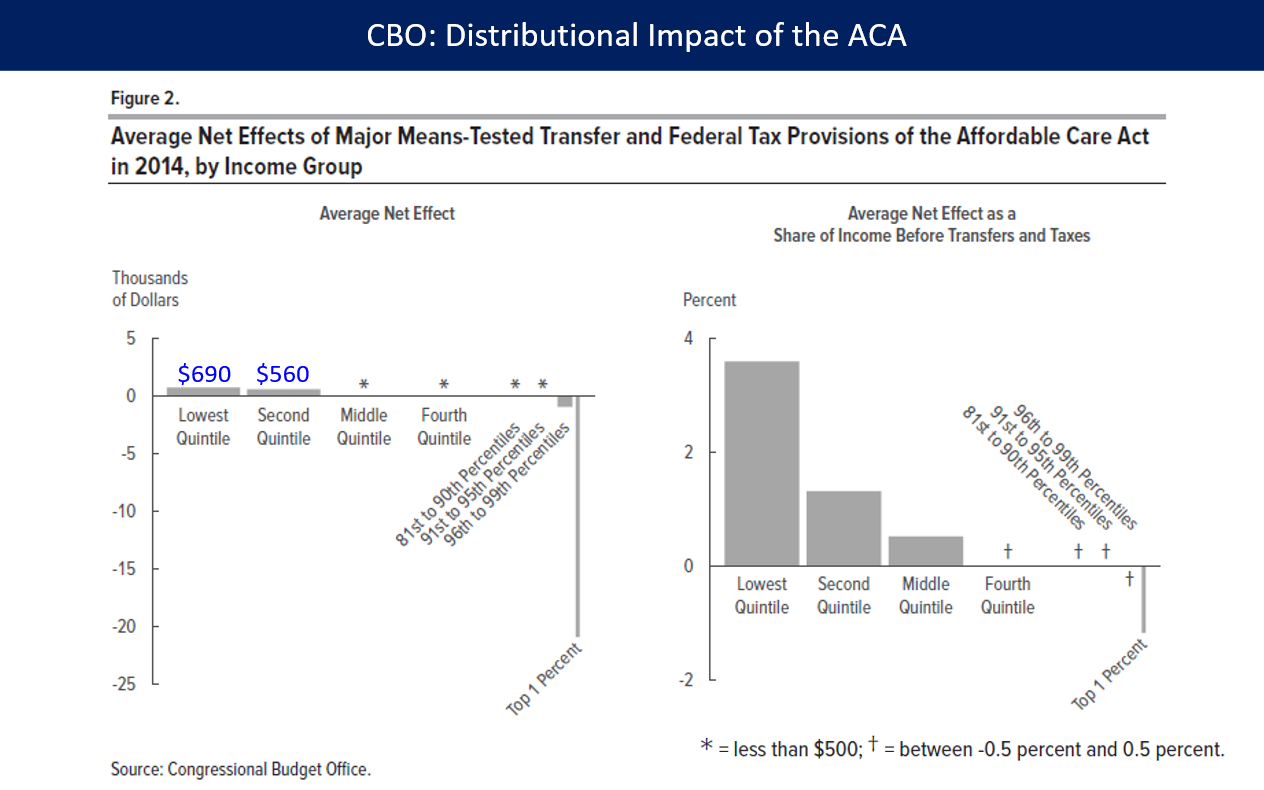
The distributional impact of the Affordable Care Act (ACA or Obamacare) during 2014. ACA raised taxes mainly on the top 1% to fund approximately $600 in benefits on average for the bottom 40% of families.

In March 2018, the CBO reported that ACA had reduced income inequality in 2014, saying the law led the lowest and second quintiles (the bottom 40%) to receive an average of an additional $690 and $560 respectively while causing households in the top 1% to pay an additional $21,000 due mostly to the net investment income tax and the additional Medicare tax. The law placed relatively little burden on households in the top quintile (top 20%) outside of the top 1%.

=== Federal deficit ===
==== CBO estimates of revenue and impact on deficit ====
The CBO reported in multiple studies that ACA would reduce the deficit, and repealing it would increase the deficit, primarily because of the elimination of Medicare reimbursement cuts. The 2011 comprehensive CBO estimate projected a net deficit reduction of more than $200 billion during the 2012–2021 period: it calculated the law would result in $604 billion in total outlays offset by $813 billion in total receipts, resulting in a $210 billion net deficit reduction. The CBO separately predicted that while most of the spending provisions do not begin until 2014, revenue would exceed spending in those subsequent years. The CBO claimed the bill would "substantially reduce the growth of Medicare's payment rates for most services; impose an excise tax on insurance plans with relatively high premiums; and make various other changes to the federal tax code, Medicare, Medicaid, and other programs"—ultimately extending the solvency of the Medicare trust fund by eight years.

This estimate was made before the Supreme Court's ruling that enabled states to opt out of the Medicaid expansion, thereby forgoing the related federal funding. The CBO and JCT subsequently updated the budget projection, estimating the impact of the ruling would reduce the cost estimate of the insurance coverage provisions by $84 billion.

In June 2015 The CBO forecast that repeal of ACA would increase the deficit between $137 billion and $353 billion over the 2016–2025 period, depending on the impact of macroeconomic feedback effects. The CBO also forecast that repeal of ACA would likely cause an increase in GDP by an average of 0.7% in the period from 2021 to 2025, mainly by boosting the supply of labor.

Although the CBO generally does not provide cost estimates beyond the 10-year budget projection period because of the degree of uncertainty involved in the projection, it decided to do so in this case at the request of lawmakers, and estimated a second decade deficit reduction of $1.2 trillion. CBO predicted deficit reduction around a broad range of one-half percent of GDP over the 2020s while cautioning that "a wide range of changes could occur".

In 2017 CBO estimated that repealing the individual mandate alone would reduce the 10-year deficit by $338 billion.

==== Opinions on CBO projections ====
The CBO cost estimates were criticized because they excluded the effects of potential legislation that would increase Medicare payments by more than $200 billion from 2010 to 2019. However, the so-called "doc fix" is a separate issue that would have existed with or without ACA. The Center on Budget and Policy Priorities objected that Congress had a good record of implementing Medicare savings. According to their study, Congress followed through on the implementation of the vast majority of provisions enacted in the past 20 years to produce Medicare savings, although not the doc fix. The doc fix became obsolete in 2015 when the savings provision was eliminated, permanently removing that spending restraint.

Health economist Uwe Reinhardt wrote, "The rigid, artificial rules under which the Congressional Budget Office must score proposed legislation unfortunately cannot produce the best unbiased forecasts of the likely fiscal impact of any legislation." Douglas Holtz-Eakin alleged that the bill would increase the deficit by $562 billion because, he argued, it front-loaded revenue and back-loaded benefits.

Scheiber and Cohn rejected critical assessments of the law's deficit impact, arguing that predictions were biased towards underestimating deficit reduction. They noted, for example, it is easier to account for the cost of definite levels of subsidies to specified numbers of people than to account for savings from preventive healthcare, and that the CBO had a track record of overestimating costs and underestimating savings of health legislation; stating, "innovations in the delivery of medical care, like greater use of electronic medical records and financial incentives for more coordination of care among doctors, would produce substantial savings while also slowing the relentless climb of medical expenses ... But the CBO would not consider such savings in its calculations, because the innovations hadn't really been tried on such large scale or in concert with one another—and that meant there wasn't much hard data to prove the savings would materialize."

In 2010 David Walker said the CBO estimates were not likely to be accurate, because they were based on the assumption that the law would not change.

=== Employer mandate and part-time work ===
The employer mandate applies to employers of more than fifty where health insurance is provided only to the full-time workers. Critics claimed it created a perverse incentive to hire part-timers instead. But between March 2010 and 2014, the number of part-time jobs declined by 230,000 while the number of full-time jobs increased by two million. Full-time jobs turned into part-time jobs much more in the public sector than in the private sector. A 2016 study found only limited evidence that ACA had increased part-time employment.

Several businesses and the state of Virginia added a 29-hour-a-week cap for their part-time employees, to reflect the 30-hour-or-more definition for full-time worker. As of 2013, few companies had shifted their workforce towards more part-time hours (4% in a survey from the Federal Reserve Bank of Minneapolis). Trends in working hours and the recovery from the Great Recession correlate with the shift from part-time to full-time work. Other confounding impacts include that health insurance helps attract and retain employees, increases productivity and reduces absenteeism; and lowers corresponding training and administration costs from a smaller, more stable workforce. Relatively few firms employ over 50 employees and more than 90% of them already offered insurance.

Most policy analysts (both right and left) were critical of the employer mandate provision. They argued that the perverse incentives regarding part-time hours, even if they did not change existing plans, were real and harmful; that the raised marginal cost of the 50th worker for businesses could limit companies' growth; that the costs of reporting and administration were not worth the costs of maintaining employer plans; and noted that the employer mandate was not essential to maintain adequate risk pools. The provision generated vocal opposition from business interests and some unions who were not granted exemptions.

=== Hospitals ===
From the start of 2010 to November 2014, 43 hospitals in rural areas closed. Critics claimed the new law had caused these closures. Many rural hospitals were built using funds from the 1946 Hill–Burton Act. Some of these hospitals reopened as other medical facilities, but only a small number operated emergency rooms (ER) or urgent care centers.

Between January 2010 and 2015, a quarter of ER doctors said they had seen a major surge in patients, while nearly half had seen a smaller increase. Seven in ten ER doctors claimed they lacked the resources to deal with large increases in the number of patients. The biggest factor in the increased number of ER patients was insufficient primary care providers to handle the larger number of insured. Michael Lee Jr. and Michael C. Monuteaux at Boston Children's Hospital analyzed national emergency department visits among children aged 0 to 17 from 2009 to 2016 using the American Community Survey (ACS) and Nationwide Emergency Department Sample (NEDS). They found no immediate change in pediatric emergency department visit rates the year after the ACA took full effect in 2014, but the rate of change from 2014 to 2016 was significantly higher than previous rate trends, almost 10%.

Several large insurers formed ACOs. Many hospitals merged and purchased physician practices, amounting to a significant consolidation of the provider industry. The increased market share gave them more leverage with insurers and reduced patient care options.

=== Economic consequences ===
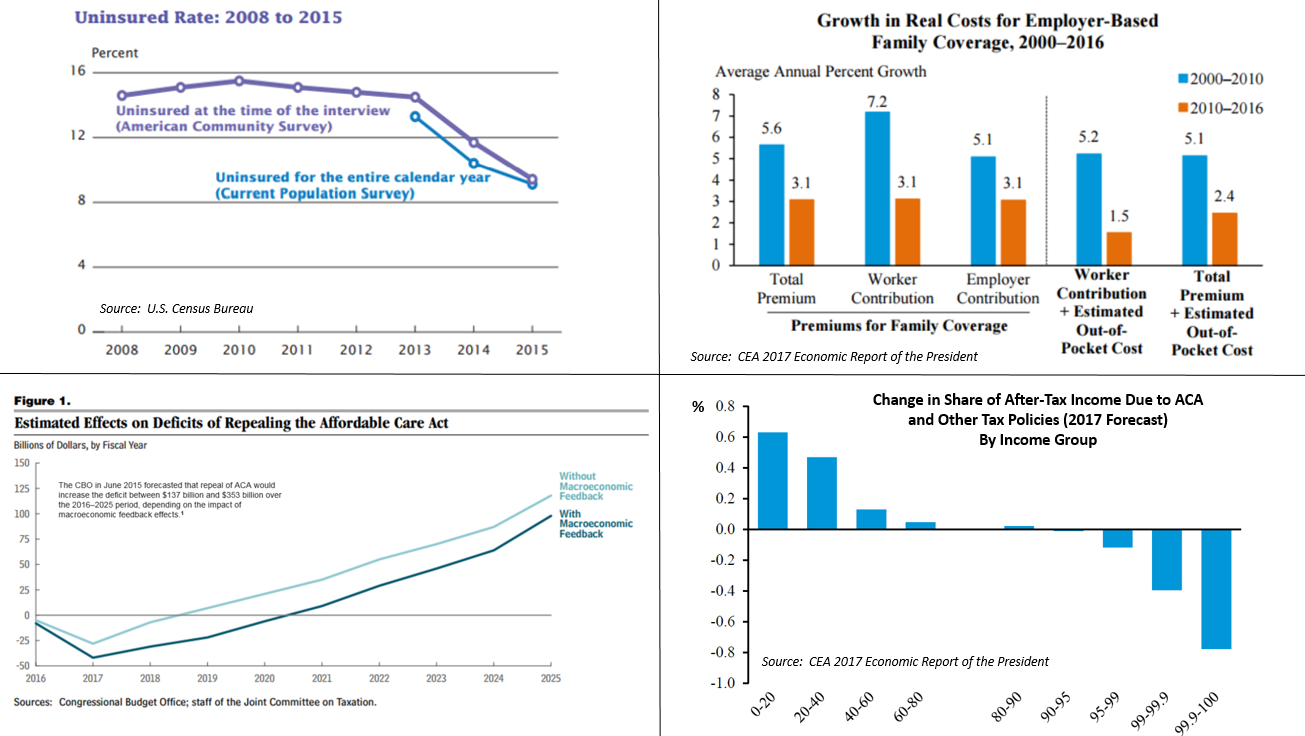
Coverage rate, employer market cost trends, budgetary impact, and income inequality aspects of the Affordable Care Act

CBO estimated in June 2015 that repealing ACA would:

- Decrease GDP in the short-term, as government spending (on subsidies) was only partially replaced by spending by recipients.
- Increase the supply of labor and aggregate compensation by about 0.8 and 0.9 percent over the 2021–2025 period. CBO cited ACA's expanded eligibility for Medicaid and subsidies and tax credits that rise with income as disincentives to work, so repealing ACA would remove those disincentives, encouraging workers to supply more labor, increasing the total number of hours worked by about 1.5% over the 2021–2025 period.
- Remove the higher tax rates on capital income, thereby encouraging investment, raising the capital stock and output in the long-run.

In 2015 the progressive Center for Economic and Policy Research found no evidence that companies were reducing worker hours to avoid ACA requirements for employees working more than 30 hours per week.

CBO estimated that ACA would slightly reduce the size of the labor force and number of hours worked, as some would no longer be tethered to employers for their insurance. Jonathan Cohn claimed that ACA's primary employment effect was to alleviate job lock and the reform's only significant employment impact was the retirement of those who were working only to stay insured.

=== Abrogated Supreme Court decision ===
ACA updated a portion of the False Claims Act that the United States Supreme Court interpreted in Graham County Soil & Water Conservation District v. United States ex rel. Wilson (2010). There, the court said that a subsection giving public officials immunity to qui tam lawsuits for false statements in "administrative" disclosures encompassed state officials as well as federal ones. Because of ACA, that section specifies that the immunity is limited to federal disclosures.

== Public opinion ==
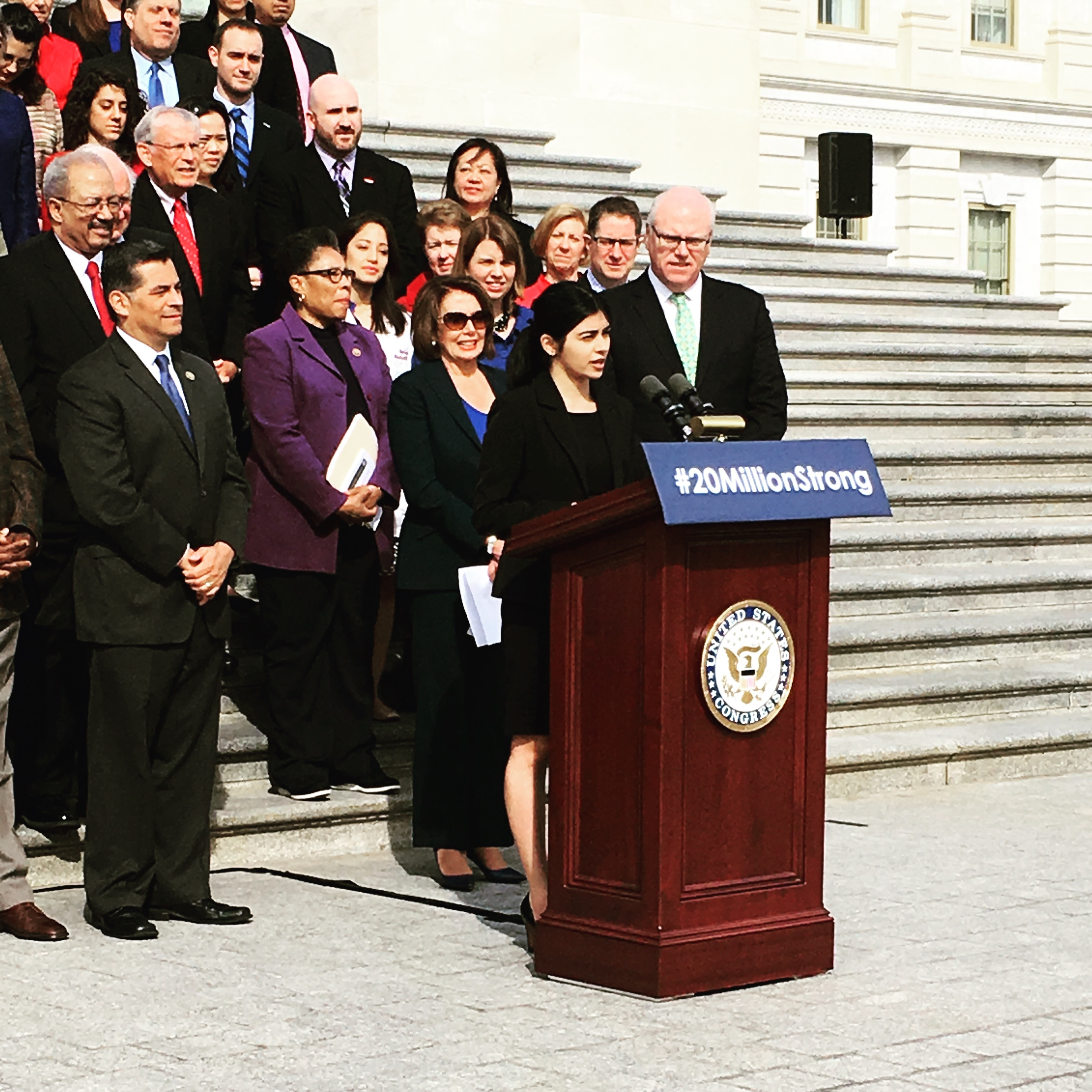
Congressional Democrats celebrate the 6th anniversary of the Affordable Care Act on the steps of the Capitol.

Public views became increasingly negative in reaction to specific plans discussed during the legislative debate over 2009 and 2010. Approval varied by party, race and age. Some elements were more widely favored (preexisting conditions) or opposed (individual mandate).

In a 2010 poll, 62% of respondents said they thought ACA would "increase the amount of money they personally spend on health care", 56% said the bill "gives the government too much involvement in health care", and 19% said they thought they and their families would be better off with the legislation. Other polls found that people were concerned the law would cost more than projected and would not do enough to control costs.

In a 2012 poll 44% supported the law, with 56% against. By 75% of Democrats, 27% of Independents and 14% of Republicans favored the law. 82% favored banning insurance companies from denying coverage to people with preexisting conditions, 61% favored allowing children to stay on their parents' insurance until age 26, 72% supported requiring companies with more than 50 employees to provide insurance for their employees, and 39% supported the individual mandate to own insurance or pay a penalty. By party affiliation, 19% of Republicans, 27% of Independents, and 59% of Democrats favored the mandate. Other polls showed additional provisions receiving majority support, including the exchanges, pooling small businesses and the uninsured with other consumers and providing subsidies.

Some opponents believed the reform did not go far enough: a 2012 poll indicated that 71% of Republican opponents rejected it overall, while 29% believed it did not go far enough; independent opponents were divided 67% to 33%; and among the much smaller group of Democratic opponents, 49% rejected it overall and 51% wanted more.

In June 2013, a majority of the public (52%) indicated a desire for "Congress to implement or tinker with the law rather than repeal it". After the Supreme Court upheld the individual mandate, a 2012 poll held that "most Americans (56%) want to see critics of President Obama's health care law drop efforts to block it and move on to other national issues".

As of October 2013, approximately 40% were in favor while 51% were against. About 29% of whites approved of the law, compared with 61% of Hispanics and 91% of African Americans. A solid majority of seniors opposed the idea and a solid majority of those under forty were in favor.

A 2014 poll reported that 26% of Americans support ACA. A later 2014 poll reported that 48.9% of respondents had an unfavorable view of ACA versus 38.3% who had a favorable view (of more than 5,500 individuals). Another held that 8% of respondents agreed the Affordable Care Act "is working well the way it is". In late 2014, a Rasmussen poll reported Repeal: 30%, Leave as is: 13%, Improve: 52%.

In 2015, a poll reported that 47% of Americans approved the health care law. This was the first time a major poll indicated that more respondents approved than disapproved. A December 2016 poll reported that: a) 30% wanted to expand what the law does; b) 26% wanted to repeal the entire law; c) 19% wanted to move forward with implementing the law as it is; and d) 17% wanted to scale back what the law does, with the remainder undecided.

Separate polls from Fox News and NBC/WSJ, both taken during January 2017, indicated more people viewed the law favorably than did not for the first time. One of the reasons for the improving popularity of the law is that Democrats who had once opposed it (many still prefer "Medicare for all") shifted their positions because ACA was under threat of repeal. Another January 2017 poll reported that 35% of respondents believed "Obamacare" and the "Affordable Care Act" were different or did not know. (About 45% were unsure whether "repeal of Obamacare" also meant "repeal of the Affordable Care Act".) 39% did not know that "many people would lose coverage through Medicaid or subsidies for private health insurance if the ACA were repealed and no replacement enacted", with Democrats far more likely (79%) to know that fact than Republicans (47%). A 2017 study found that personal experience with public health insurance programs led to greater support for the ACA, most prominently among Republicans and low-information voters.

By the end of 2023, a Morning Consult poll of registered voters found that 57% approved of the Affordable Care Act, while 30% disapproved of it. 85% of Democrats, 56% of independents, and 28% of Republicans supported the law.

== Political aspects ==
=== "Obamacare" ===
The term "Obamacare" was originally coined by opponents as a pejorative. According to research by Elspeth Reeve, the expression was used in early 2007, generally by writers describing the candidate's proposal for expanding coverage for the uninsured. The term officially emerged in March 2007 when healthcare lobbyist Jeanne Schulte Scott wrote, "We will soon see a 'Giuliani-care' and 'Obama-care' to go along with 'McCain-care', 'Edwards-care', and a totally revamped and remodeled 'Hillary-care' from the 1990s".

In May 2007, Mitt Romney introduced it to political discourse, saying, "How can we get those people insured without raising taxes and without having government take over healthcare?' And let me tell you, if we don't do it, the Democrats will. If the Democrats do it, it will be socialized medicine; it'll be government-managed care. It'll be what's known as Hillarycare or Barack Obamacare, or whatever you want to call it."

By mid-2012, Obamacare had become the colloquial term used both by supporters and opponents. Obama eventually endorsed the nickname, saying, "I have no problem with people saying Obama cares. I do care." By 2016 Obama explicitly and repeatedly referred to the ACA as "Obamacare".

The use of "Obamacare" became increasingly rare, and at the 2024 Democratic National Convention, Obama said, "I noticed, by the way, since it became popular, they don't call it 'Obamacare' no more."

=== Common misconceptions ===
==== "Death panels" ====
On August 7, 2009, Sarah Palin created the term "death panels" to describe groups who would decide whether sick patients were "worthy" of medical care. "Death panel" referred to two claims about early drafts.

One was that under the law, seniors could be denied care due to their age and the other that the government would advise seniors to end their lives instead of receiving care. The ostensible basis of these claims was the provision for an Independent Payment Advisory Board (IPAB). IPAB was given the authority to recommend cost-saving changes to Medicare by facilitating the adoption of cost-effective treatments and cost-recovering measures when statutory expenditure levels were exceeded within any given three-year period. In fact, the Board was prohibited from recommending changes that would reduce payments before 2020, and was prohibited from recommending changes in premiums, benefits, eligibility and taxes, or other changes that would result in rationing.

The other related issue concerned advance-care planning consultation: a section of the House reform proposal would have reimbursed physicians for providing patient-requested consultations for Medicare recipients on end-of-life health planning (which is covered by many private plans), enabling patients to specify, on request, the kind of care they wished to receive. The provision was not included in ACA.

In 2010, the Pew Research Center reported that 85% of Americans were familiar with the claim, and 30% believed it was true, backed by three contemporaneous polls. The allegation was named PolitiFact's 2009 "Lie of the Year", one of FactCheck.org's "whoppers" and the most outrageous term by the American Dialect Society. AARP described such rumors as "rife with gross—and even cruel—distortions".

==== Members of Congress ====
ACA requires members of Congress and their staffs to obtain health insurance either through an exchange or some other program approved by the law (such as Medicare), instead of using the insurance offered to federal employees (the Federal Employees Health Benefits Program).

==== Undocumented immigrants ====
ACA explicitly denies insurance subsidies to "unauthorized (illegal) aliens".

==== Exchange "death spiral" ====
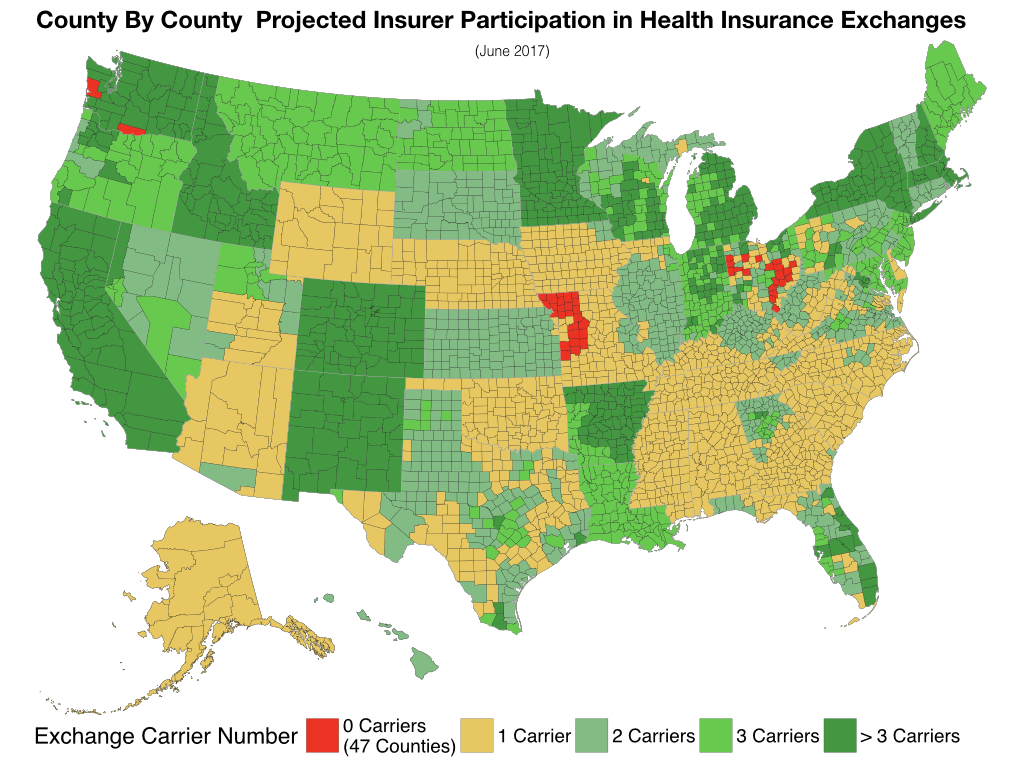

Opponents claimed that combining immediate coverage with no provision for preexisting conditions would lead people to wait to get insured until they got sick. The individual mandate was designed to push people to get insured without waiting. This has been called a "death spiral". In the years after 2013, many insurers did leave specific marketplaces, claiming the risk pools were too small.

The median number of insurers per state was 4.0 in 2014, 5.0 in 2015, 4.0 in 2016 and 3.0 in 2017. Five states had one insurer in 2017, 13 had two, 11 had three; the remainder had four or more.

==== "If you like your plan" ====
At various times during and after ACA debate Obama said, "If you like your health care plan, you'll be able to keep your health care plan." But in 2013, millions of Americans with individual policies received notices that their insurance plans had been terminated, and several million more risked seeing their plans canceled.

Obama's previous unambiguous assurance that consumers could keep their own plans became a focal point for critics, who challenged his truthfulness. Various bills were introduced in Congress to allow people to keep their plans.

PolitiFact initially cited various estimates that only about 2% of the total insured population (4 million out of 262 million) received such notices, but readers later voted Obama's claims as the 2013 "Lie of the Year".

== Criticism and opposition ==
Opposition and efforts to repeal the legislation have drawn support from sources that include labor unions, conservative advocacy groups, Republicans, small business organizations and the Tea Party movement. These groups claimed the law would disrupt existing health plans, increase costs from new insurance standards, and increase the deficit. Some opposed the idea of universal healthcare. President Donald Trump repeatedly promised to "repeal and replace" it.

As of 2013 unions that expressed concerns included the AFL–CIO, which called ACA "highly disruptive", claiming it would drive up costs of union-sponsored plans; the International Brotherhood of Teamsters, United Food and Commercial Workers International Union, and UNITE-HERE, whose leaders argued "PPACA will shatter not only our hard-earned health benefits, but destroy the foundation of the 40-hour work week that is the backbone of the American middle class." In 2014, Laborers' International Union of North America (LIUNA) president Terry O'Sullivan and Unite Here president D. Taylor wrote, "ACA, as implemented, undermines fair marketplace competition in the health care industry."

In October 2016, Mark Dayton, the governor of Minnesota, said ACA had "many good features" but it was "no longer affordable for increasing numbers of people"; he called on the state legislature to provide emergency relief to policyholders. Dayton later said he regretted his remarks after they were seized on by Republicans seeking to repeal the law.

=== Socialism debate ===
Many economically conservative opponents called the ACA "socialist" or "socialized medicine", pointing to the government redistribution of wealth via subsidies for low-income purchasers of private insurance, expansion of Medicaid, government requirements as to what products can be sold on the exchanges, and the individual mandate, which reduces freedom of consumer choice to be uninsured.

Other observers considered the law a relatively capitalist or "regulated free-market" means of paying for near-universal health care, because it creates new marketplaces with choices for consumers, largely relies on private employers and private health insurance companies, maintains private ownership of hospitals and doctor's offices, and was originally advocated by economic conservatives as a capitalist alternative to single-payer health care. Some pointed out that the previous system also had socialist aspects. Even for-profit private health insurance companies socialize risk and redistribute wealth from people who have it (all premium payers) to those who need it (by paying for medically necessary healthcare). The requirement to provide emergency care also forced redistribution from people who pay insurance premiums to those who choose to be uninsured, when they visit the emergency room.

Some ACA supporters accused conservatives of using the term "socialism" as a negative buzzword for ACA as it was for Medicare and Medicaid, and some embraced the label "socialism" as desirable, distinguishing democratic socialism as desirable for education and health care and communism as undesirable. Milos Forman opined that critics "falsely equate Western European-style socialism, and its government provision of social insurance and health care, with Marxist–Leninist totalitarianism".

=== Legal challenges ===
==== National Federation of Independent Business v. Sebelius ====
Opponents challenged ACA's constitutionality in multiple lawsuits on multiple grounds. The Supreme Court ruled, 5–4, that the individual mandate was constitutional when viewed as a tax, although not under the Commerce Clause.

ACA withheld all Medicaid funding from states declining to participate in the expansion. The Court ruled that this was unconstitutionally coercive and that individual states had the right to opt out without losing preexisting Medicaid funding.

==== Contraception mandate ====
In March 2012, the Catholic Church, while supportive of ACA's objectives, voiced concern through the United States Conference of Catholic Bishops that aspects of the mandate covering contraception and sterilization and HHS's narrow definition of a religious organization violated the First Amendment right to free exercise of religion and conscience. Various lawsuits addressed these concerns, including Burwell v. Hobby Lobby Stores, Inc., which looked at private corporations and their duties under the ACA.

In Little Sisters of the Poor Saints Peter and Paul Home v. Pennsylvania, the Supreme Court ruled 7–2 on July 8, 2020, that employers with religious or moral objections to contraceptives can exclude such coverage from an employee's insurance plan. Writing for the majority, Justice Clarence Thomas said, "No language in the statute itself even hints that Congress intended that contraception should or must be covered. It was Congress, not the [administration], that declined to expressly require contraceptive coverage in the ACA itself." Justices Roberts, Alito, Gorsuch, and Kavanaugh joined Thomas's opinion. Justice Elena Kagan filed a concurring opinion in the judgment, in which Stephen Breyer joined. Justices Ginsburg and Sotomayor dissented, saying the court's ruling "leaves women workers to fend for themselves."

In a later lawsuit brought by private health insurance buyers and businesses, Judge Reed O'Connor of the Federal District Court for the Northern District of Texas ruled in March 2023 that the ACA's provision of contraceptives, HIV testing, and screenings for cancer, diabetes, and mental health violated the plaintiffs' freedom of religious exercise, and placed an injunction on that portion of the ACA. The Biden administration planned to seek a hold on O'Connor's decision.

==== King v Burwell ====
On June 25, 2015, the U.S. Supreme Court ruled, 6–3, that federal subsidies for health insurance premiums could be used in the 34 states that did not set up their own insurance exchanges.

==== House v. Price ====
House Republicans sued the Obama administration in 2014, alleging that cost-sharing reduction subsidy payments to insurers were unlawful because Congress had not appropriated funds to pay for them. The argument classified the CSR subsidy as discretionary spending subject to annual appropriation. In May 2016, a federal judge ruled for the plaintiffs, but the Obama administration appealed. Later, President Trump ended the payments. This led to further litigation.

==== United States House of Representatives v. Azar ====
The House sued the administration, alleging that the money for CSRs to insurers had not been appropriated, as required for any federal government spending. The ACA subsidy that helps customers pay premiums was not part of the suit.

Without the CSRs, the government estimated that premiums would increase by 20% to 30% for silver plans. In 2017, the uncertainty about whether the payments would continue caused Blue Cross Blue Shield of North Carolina to try to raise premiums by 22.9% the next year, as opposed to an increase of 8.8% that it would have sought if the payments were assured.

U.S. District Judge Rosemary M. Collyer ruled that the cost-sharing program was unconstitutional for spending money that has not been specifically provided by an act of Congress, but concluded that Congress had in fact authorized that program to be created. The judge also found that Congress had provided authority to cover the spending for the tax credits to consumers who use them to help afford health coverage. Collyer enjoined further cost-sharing payments, but stayed the order pending appeal to the United States Court of Appeals for the District of Columbia Circuit. The case ended in a settlement before the Circuit Court.

==== California v. Texas ====
Texas and 19 other states filed a civil suit in the United States District Court for the Northern District of Texas in February 2018, arguing that with the passage of the Tax Cuts and Jobs Act of 2017, which eliminated the tax for not having health insurance, the individual mandate no longer had a constitutional basis and thus the entire ACA was no longer constitutional. The Department of Justice said it would no longer defend the ACA in court, but 17 states led by California stepped in to do so.

District Judge Reed O'Connor of Texas ruled for the plaintiffs on December 14, 2018, writing that the "Individual Mandate can no longer be fairly read as an exercise of Congress's Tax Power and is still impermissible under the Interstate Commerce Clause—meaning the Individual Mandate is unconstitutional." He then further reasoned that the individual mandate is an essential part of the entire law, and thus was not severable, making the entire law unconstitutional. O'Connor's decision regarding severability turned on several passages from the Congressional debate that focused on the importance of the mandate. While he ruled the law unconstitutional, he did not overturn the law.

The intervening states appealed the decision to the Fifth Circuit. These states argued that Congress's change in the tax was only reducing the amount of the tax, and that Congress had the power to write a stronger law to this end. O'Connor stayed his decision pending the appeal. The Fifth Circuit heard the appeal on July 9, 2019; in the interim, the U.S. Department of Justice joined with Republican states to argue that the ACA was unconstitutional, while the Democratic states were joined by the Democrat-controlled U.S. House of Representatives. An additional question was addressed, as the Republican plaintiffs challenged the Democratic states' standing to defend the ACA.

In December 2019, the Fifth Circuit agreed the individual mandate was unconstitutional, but did not agree that the entire law should be voided. Instead, it remanded the case to the District Court for reconsideration of that question. The Supreme Court accepted the case in March 2020, to be heard in the 2020–2021 term, with the ruling likely falling after the 2020 elections.

Democrats pointed out that the effect of invalidating the entire law would be to remove popular provisions such as the protection for preexisting conditions, and that the Republicans had still not offered any replacement plan—important issues in the 2020 elections.

On June 17, 2021, the Court rejected the challenge in a 7–2 decision, ruling that Texas and the other plaintiff states did not have standing to challenge the provision, leaving the full ACA intact.

==== Section 1557 ====
In April 2024, the Biden administration issued a final rule implementing Section 1557 of the ACA, adding gender identity to Title IX's definition of discrimination based on sex. In May 2024, 15 states led by Tennessee sued HHS in the U.S. District Court for the Southern District of Mississippi, arguing that the 2024 rule violated the Administrative Procedure Act and the U.S. Constitution. In October 2025, a federal judge struck down the 2024 rule to the extent that it prohibits discrimination against transgender people in education and health-care programs.

==== Risk corridors ====
The Supreme Court ruled that promised risk corridor payments must be made even in the absence of specific appropriation of money by Congress.

==== Non-cooperation ====
Officials in Texas, Florida, Alabama, Wyoming, Arizona, Oklahoma and Missouri opposed those elements over which they had discretion. For example, Missouri declined to expand Medicaid or establish a health insurance marketplace engaging in active non-cooperation, enacting a statute forbidding any state or local official to render any aid not specifically required by federal law. Other Republicans discouraged efforts to advertise the law's benefits. Some conservative political groups launched ad campaigns to discourage enrollment.

=== Repeal and modification efforts ===
ACA was the subject of many unsuccessful repeal efforts by Republicans in the 111th, 112th, and 113th Congresses: Representatives Steve King and Michele Bachmann introduced bills in the House to repeal the ACA the day after it was signed, as did Senator Jim DeMint in the Senate. In 2011, after Republicans gained control of the House, one of the first votes held was on a bill titled "Repealing the Job-Killing Health Care Law Act" (H.R. 2), which the House passed 245–189. All Republicans and three Democrats voted for repeal. In the Senate, the bill was offered as an amendment to an unrelated bill, but was voted down. President Obama said he would veto the bill had it passed.

2017 House Budget

On February 3, 2015, the House of Representatives added its 67th repeal vote to the record (239 to 186). This attempt also failed.

==== 2013 federal government shutdown ====
Strong partisan disagreement in Congress prevented adjustments to the Act's provisions. But at least one change, a proposed repeal of a tax on medical devices, received bipartisan support. Some Congressional Republicans argued against improvements to the law on the grounds that they would weaken the arguments for repeal.

Republicans attempted to defund the ACA's implementation, and in October 2013 House Republicans refused to fund the federal government unless it came with an implementation delay, after Obama unilaterally deferred the employer mandate by one year, which critics claimed he had no power to do. The House passed three versions of a bill funding the government while submitting various versions that would repeal or delay the ACA, with the last version delaying enforcement of the individual mandate. The Democratic Senate leadership said the Senate would pass only a bill without any restrictions on ACA. The government shutdown lasted from October 1 to October 17.

==== 2017 repeal effort ====
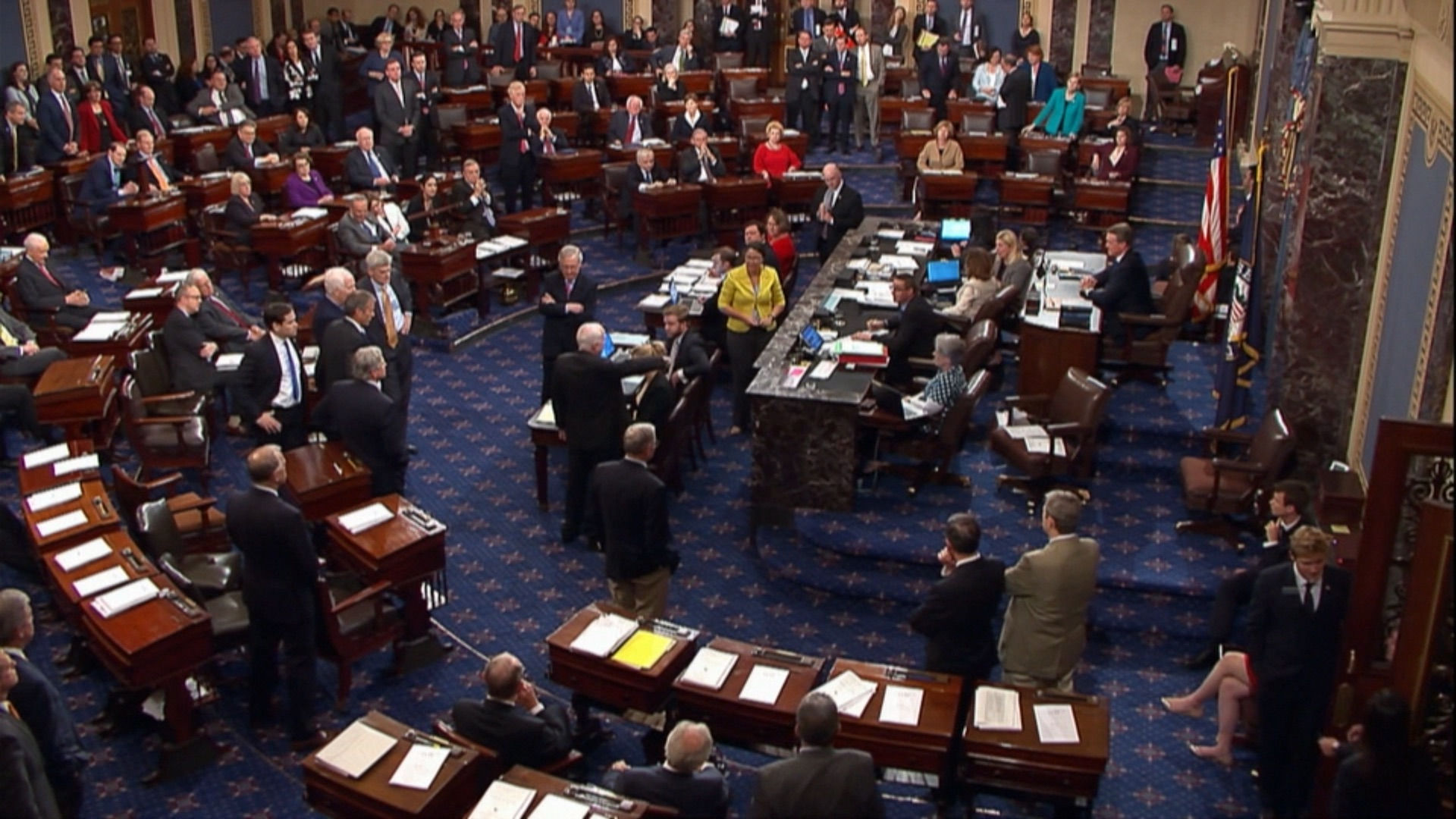
McCain votes no on repealing the Affordable Care Act by giving a thumbs down.

During a midnight congressional session starting January 11, the Senate of the 115th Congress of the United States voted to approve a "budget blueprint" that would allow Republicans to repeal parts of the law "without threat of a Democratic filibuster". The plan, which passed 51–48, was named by Senate Republicans the "Obamacare 'repeal resolution.'" Democrats opposing the resolution staged a protest during the vote.

House Republicans announced their replacement, the American Health Care Act, on March 6. On March 24, the AHCA failed amid a revolt among Republican representatives.

On May 4 the House voted to pass the AHCA by a margin of 217 to 213. The Senate Republican leadership announced that Senate Republicans would write their own version of the bill instead of voting on the House version.

Leader McConnell named a group of 13 Republicans to draft the substitute version in private, raising bipartisan concerns about lack of transparency. On June 22, Republicans released the first discussion draft, which renamed it the "Better Care Reconciliation Act of 2017" (BCRA). On July 25, although no amendment proposal had garnered majority support, Republicans voted to advance the bill to the floor and begin formal consideration of amendments. Senators Susan Collins and Lisa Murkowski were the only two dissenting Republicans, making the vote a 50–50 tie. Vice President Mike Pence then cast the tie-breaking vote in the affirmative.

The revised BCRA failed, 43–57. A subsequent "Obamacare Repeal and Reconciliation Act" abandoned the "repeal and replace" approach in favor of a straight repeal, but that too failed, 45–55. Finally, the "Health Care Freedom Act", nicknamed "skinny repeal" because it would have made the least change to ACA, failed by 49–51, with Collins, Murkowski, and McCain joining all Democrats and independents in voting against it.

==== Proposed changes in 2024 ====
Donald Trump, who has historically opposed the ACA, said during the 2024 United States presidential debates that he had "concepts of a plan" to modify or scrap it. JD Vance has said that Trump intends to allow insurance companies to discriminate against people with preexisting conditions or disability, with subsidized insurance replaced with private insurance. Kamala Harris said during her 2024 campaign that she would "maintain and grow" the ACA.

==== 2025 federal government shutdown ====
During the 2025 federal government shutdown, the ACA once again became a focal point of partisan disagreement. On November 8–9, 2025, as the shutdown reached its 39th day, President Donald Trump urged Senate Republicans to redirect federal funds used for ACA insurance subsidies toward direct cash payments to individuals, framing the proposal as a strategy to resolve the budgetary impasse. Several Republican senators expressed openness to the idea; Democrats rejected it. Analysts noted that the proposal lacked the bipartisan support necessary to reopen the federal government. Contemporary reports described the dispute over the ACA's subsidy structure as one of the key issues contributing to the protracted shutdown. Trump said he believed the law will expire once its tax credit is eliminated and not renewed.

The disagreement focused on whether to continue the enhanced premium tax credits expanded under previous legislation, including the American Rescue Plan, which lowered the portion of health insurance costs consumers pay. Observers noted that if these subsidies expired, many individuals could face significant premium increases, potentially more than doubling for some enrollees. This raised concerns about decreased enrollment in the ACA marketplaces, especially among individuals who previously received little or no subsidy.

In addition to the effects on consumers, small businesses and self-employed individuals relying on ACA marketplace plans faced potential financial strain. Reports also highlighted that certain federal health agency employees were furloughed during the shutdown, temporarily affecting the oversight and administration of health programs. The debate over ACA funding illustrated how federal budget impasses can have immediate effects on both insurance markets and the delivery of health services.

=== Actions to hinder implementation ===
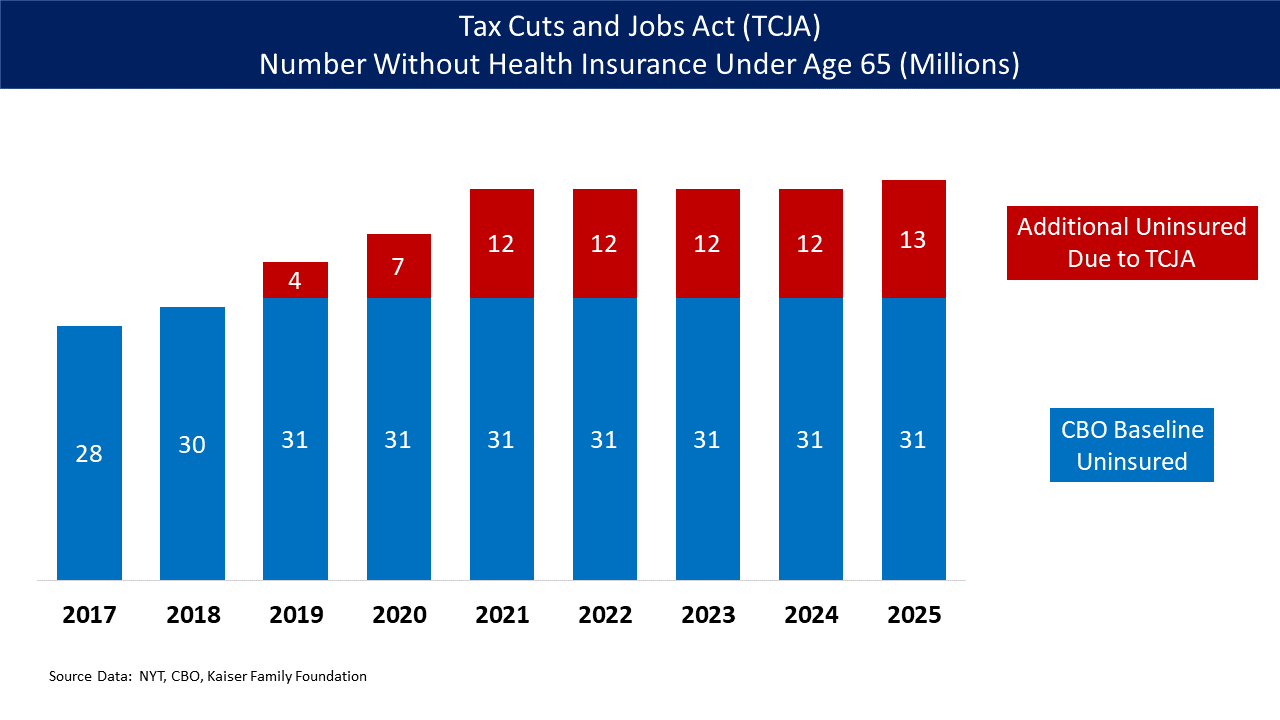
Tax Cuts and Jobs Act—number of additional persons uninsured

Under both the ACA (current law) and the AHCA, the CBO reported that the health exchange marketplaces would remain stable. But Republican politicians took a variety of steps to undermine it, creating uncertainty that adversely impacted enrollment and insurer participation while increasing premiums. Concern about the exchanges became another argument for reforms. Past and ongoing Republican attempts to weaken the law have included:

- Lawsuits such as King v. Burwell and House v. Price.
- President Trump ended the payment of cost-sharing reduction subsidies to insurers on October 12, 2017. CBO estimated in September 2017 that discontinuing the payments would add an average of 15–20 percentage points to health insurance costs on the exchanges in 2018 while increasing the budget deficit nearly $200 billion over a decade. In response, insurers sued the government for reimbursement. Various cases are under appeal as of 2019. Several insurers and actuarial groups estimated this resulted in a 20 percentage point or more increase in premiums for the 2018 plan year. In other words, premium increases expected to be 10% or less in 2018 became 28–40% instead. The insurers would need to make up the $7 billion they had previously received in cost-sharing reductions (CSRs) by raising premiums. Since most premiums are subsidized, the federal government would cover most of the increases. CBO also estimated that initially up to one million fewer people would have health insurance coverage, although rising subsidies might eventually offset this. The 85% of enrollees who received subsidies would be unaffected. CBO expected the exchanges to remain stable (i.e., no "death spiral" before or after Trump's action) as the premiums would increase and prices would stabilize at the higher (non-CSR) level. Several insurance companies who sued the United States for failure to pay CSRs won cases in 2018 and 2019. The judiciary decided the insurance companies are entitled to unpaid CSRs.
- The 2015 appropriations bill had a rider that ended the payment of risk corridor funds. This was repeated in later years. This resulted in the bankruptcy of many co-ops. This action was attributed to Senator Marco Rubio. The cutoff generated some 50 lawsuits. The Supreme Court granted certiorari in 2019 in the case Maine Community Health Options v. United States.
- Trump weakened the individual mandate with his first executive order, which limited enforcement of the tax. For example, tax returns without indications of health insurance ("silent returns") will still be processed, overriding Obama's instructions to reject them.
- Trump reduced funding for advertising for exchange enrollment by up to 90%, with other reductions to support resources used to answer questions and help people sign-up for coverage. The CBO said the reductions would reduce ACA enrollment.
- Trump reduced the enrollment period for 2018 by half, to 45 days.
- Trump made public statements that the exchanges were unstable or in a death spiral.

=== Perceived inadequacies ===
In December 2009, former DNC chairman and former Vermont governor Howard Dean called the ACA "a bigger bailout for the insurance industry than AIG" and "an insurance company's dream". He viewed the bill's end form as a death of the health care reform effort.

In his 2011 book Remedy and Reaction, Paul Starr, the former senior advisor for Bill Clinton's health care reform plan, notes that the ACA did not make health insurance a right and did not make medical care free at the point of service. He criticizies the ACA on the grounds that some lower-income individuals still cannot afford treatment and go without care "if health care and insurance are treated as ordinary commodities".

The ACA's critics often cite its inability to control costs and lower deductibles, the difficulty for average people to compare plans, lack of a strong public option, and inadequate regulations on or alternatives (such as co-operatives) to large corporate health care companies.

== Implementation ==
In 2010 small business tax credits took effect. Then Pre-Existing Condition Insurance Plan (PCIP) took effect to offer insurance to those who had been denied coverage by private insurance companies because of a preexisting condition. By 2011, insurers had stopped marketing child-only policies in 17 states, as they sought to escape this requirement. In National Federation of Independent Business v. Sebelius the Supreme Court allowed states to opt out of the Medicaid expansion.

In 2013, the Internal Revenue Service ruled that the cost of covering only the individual employee would be considered in determining whether the cost of coverage exceeded 9.5% of income. Family plans would not be considered even if the cost was above the 9.5% income threshold. On July 2, Obama delayed the employer mandate until 2015. The launch for both the state and federal exchanges was beset by management and technical failings. HealthCare.gov, the website that offers insurance through the exchanges operated by the federal government, crashed on opening and suffered many problems. Operations stabilized in 2014, although not all planned features were complete.

The Government Accountability Office released a non-partisan study in 2014 that concluded the administration had not provided "effective planning or oversight practices" in developing the exchanges. In Burwell v. Hobby Lobby the Supreme Court exempted closely held corporations with religious convictions from the contraception rule. At the beginning of the 2015, 11.7 million had signed up (ex-Medicaid). By the end of the year about 8.8 million consumers had stayed in the program. Congress repeatedly delayed the onset of the "Cadillac tax" on expensive insurance plans first until 2020 and later until 2022 and repealed it in late 2019.

An estimated 9 to 10 million people had gained Medicaid coverage in 2016, mostly low-income adults. The five major national insurers expected to lose money on ACA policies in 2016, in part because the enrollees were lower income, older and sicker than expected.

More than 9.2 million people (3.0 million new customers and 6.2 million returning) enrolled on the national exchange in 2017, down some 400,000 from 2016. This decline was due primarily to the election of President Trump. The eleven states that run their own exchanges signed up about 3 million more. The IRS announced that it would not require that tax returns indicate a person has health insurance, reducing the effectiveness of the individual mandate, in response to Trump's executive order. The CBO reported in March that the healthcare exchanges were expected to be stable. In May the House voted to repeal the ACA using the American Health Care Act (AHCA), but the AHCA was defeated in the Senate. The Tax Cuts and Jobs Act set the individual mandate penalty at $0 starting in 2019. The CBO estimated that the change would cause 13 million fewer people to have health insurance in 2027.

The 2017 Individual Market Stabilization Bill was proposed to fund cost-sharing reductions, provide more flexibility for state waivers, allow a new "Copper Plan" offering only catastrophic coverage, allow interstate insurance compacts, and redirect consumer fees to states for outreach. The bill failed.

By 2019, 35 states and the District of Columbia had either expanded coverage via traditional Medicaid or via an alternative program.

== In popular culture ==
SNL presented a sketch in October 2009 about the legislation's gridlock, with Dwayne Johnson playing an angry President Obama confronting three senators opposing the plan.

The show aired another sketch in September 2013 with Jay Pharoah as President Obama rolling out the plan to the public, and Aaron Paul (in character as Jesse Pinkman) and other cast members playing ordinary Americans helping him in advocating for the legislation.

== See also ==
- Social policy
- Health policy
- Broccoli mandate
- Comparison of the healthcare systems in Canada and the United States
- Individual shared responsibility provision
- Massachusetts health care reform (sometimes called "Romneycare")
- Medicaid
- Medicare Access and CHIP Reauthorization Act of 2015 (Reform to the American Health Care system signed into law by President Obama)
- Single-payer health care
- Blue Dog Coalition
- Universal health care
- Universal health coverage by country
- U.S. health care compared with eight other countries (tabular form)
