= Health Republic Insurance of New York =

- Type: Not-for-Profit, CO-OP
- Industry: Health Insurance
- Founded: 2013
- Headquarters: New York, New York
- Area served: New York State
- Website: healthrepublicny.org

Health Republic Insurance of New York was a not-for-profit health insurance cooperative in New York State.

Health Republic was created as one of 23 Consumer Operated and Oriented Plans, known as CO-OPs, established under the Affordable Care Act to increase competition in the marketplace and give consumers a voice in their healthcare. Health Republic began selling insurance plans to individuals and small groups, both on and off the NY State of Health marketplace, in October 2013.

During the 2013-2014 Open Enrollment period, Health Republic captured the largest marketshare on the New York State of Health marketplace. It became the largest CO-OP in the country during this period.

In September 2014, Health Republic members were able to vote for Member Directors on the CO-OP's Board of Directors, with nine members ultimately elected from across the state, making up a majority of the Board.

For 2015, Health Republic expanded its service area by 11 counties upstate to a total of 43 counties statewide; added two new products: an out-of-network plan for small groups and a higher-deductible plan for individuals; and expanded its provider network in the Albany area

On September 27, 2015, Health Republic announced that it would begin the processes of ceasing operations, effective immediately.
