= Nutrition labeling requirements of the Affordable Care Act =

Section 4205 of the Patient Protection and Affordable Care Act (ACA) requires that standard menu items at qualifying chain restaurants and vending machines have proper nutrition labeling. Though the Affordable Care Act was signed into federal law in 2010, implementation of the menu labeling requirements was delayed by the U.S. Food and Drug Administration several times until they went into effect on May 7, 2018.

This act falls under Title IV of the ACA: Prevention of Chronic Disease and Improving Public Health, which seeks to "transition from a system focused primarily on treating the sick to one that helps keep people well throughout their lives." Section 4205 is an amendment to the nutrition labeling requirements of Section 403(q)(5) in the Federal Food, Drug, and Cosmetic Act (FFDCA), under the Nutrition Labeling and Education Act of 1990 (NLEA). Section 4205 mandates labeling nutrition information for foods at chain restaurants and vending machine items to help consumers make more informed food choices.

== Importance ==
Section 4205 of the ACA addresses the issues of obesity and chronic disease by raising awareness of calories consumed outside of the home, as, according to the American Journal of Preventive Medicine, these types of calories increase obesity, a disease that costs the U.S. $147 billion in health care expenses in 2008.

== Requirements ==
=== Covered Establishments ===
The FDA’s Proposed Requirements under Section 4205 apply to all “restaurants or similar retail food establishments with 20 or more locations doing business under the same name and offering for sale substantially the same menu items." The primary business activity of a covered establishment is the sale of food to consumers. A business is covered under this requirement if:

1. The establishment presents itself as a restaurant, or
2. More than 50% of the establishments total floor area is used for the sale of food.

Not covered under these regulations are:

- Mass transit (such as airplanes);
- Bowling alleys;
- All other establishments that do not exist for the primary purpose to sell food.

Businesses may also voluntarily apply to take part in these requirements.

Caloric Information

Establishments must provide a calorie display, statement regarding calorie intake, and additional written nutrition information available upon request.

Calorie Display

- Disclose calorie count on all menus and menu boards, labelled with the words "Calories" or "Cal";
- Clear and prominent display of calories;
- Disclose calorie ranges for variable menu items;
- Display of calories contained per serving of foods on display or self-service foods, such as salad bars, buffets, and fountain beverages;
- Food items that do not require a calorie count include: condiments and other general use items, daily specials and items appearing on the menu for less than 90 days.

Statement of Caloric Intake

Covered establishments must provide consumers a “succinct statement concerning suggested daily caloric intake”, which is intended to increase consumers’ contextual awareness of their food choice in relation their recommended daily caloric intake.

Additional Written Nutritional Information

- Statement of availability of additional written nutrition information available upon request must be displayed on menus and menu boards.
- Additional nutrition information for standard menu items must include total calories, calories from fat, total fat, saturated fat, cholesterol, trans fat, sodium, total carbohydrates, sugars, dietary fiber and protein.

Furthermore, nutrition information is to be established on a ‘reasonable basis’ through nutrient analysis, cookbooks, or nutrient databases. In the case that there are variations in menu items (i.e. soft drinks, flavors, toppings and combination meals), the Secretary of Health and Human Services will establish standards to account for these differences.

=== Vending Machines ===
Under Section 4205, owners of 20 or more vending machines must make calorie information for each item sold in the machine visible to consumers prior to purchase, either by making nutrition information on individual packages visible or by posting calorie information in close proximity to the food.

Calorie Display

- Display calorie information clearly and prominently;
- Utilize the term "Calorie" or "Cal" on postings of caloric information;
- Post calorie information on a sign in close proximity to the article of food or the selection button with a “clear and conspicuous statement disclosing the number of calories contained in the article.”

=== Other ===
Restaurants and vending machine owners who are not subject to the law may voluntarily participate by registering with the Secretary of Health and Human Services within 120 days of enactment.

== Implementation ==
The requirement to implement these changes has been extended to an additional year, to May 7, 2018.

Provisions for the nutrition labeling of standard menu items at chain restaurants became effective on March 23, 2010, when President Barack Obama signed the bill into law. Because specific provisions of the law depend on rules developed by the Food and Drug Administration, certain requirements could not be immediately enforced.

=== Provisions of Section 4205 Immediately Required upon the Passage of the ACA ===
Immediately upon enactment of the law, the following provisions of Section 4205 were required:

Restaurants or similar food establishments covered by the provision were required to:

- Disclose the number of calories of each standard menu item on menus and menu boards;
- Make available written nutrition information to consumers upon request;
- State the availability of written nutrition information in a "prominent, clear, and conspicuous" manner on menus and menu boards; and
- Provide calorie information, per serving/food item, for self-service items and food on display, on a sign adjacent to each food item.

Chain vending machine operators covered by the provision were required to:

- Disclose the number of calories in each food article on a sign located in close proximity to each article of food (or the selection button) unless the Nutrition
- Facts Panel is visible to the consumer. This information must be visible to the consumer prior to purchasing the items.

Despite the requirement of these provisions immediately upon enactment of the law, several provisions cannot be enforced until the regulations are finalized. The FDA must establish the requirements for the following provisions before they may be enforced:

- Requirements for a statement on the menu or menu board to include calorie information in terms of total daily caloric intake; and
- Standards to determine and disclose nutrient content for standard menu items that come in different flavors, varieties or combinations, however, they are listed as a single menu item.

The FDA may issue additional nutrient disclosure regulations under Section 4205, at their discretion, to further assist the public in making healthy eating choices.

== Challenges ==
=== Cost ===
==== Covered Establishments ====
The FDA estimates the initial cost of compliance to be $315 million with a continuous annual cost of approximately $44 million; however, the food industry estimates that the total costs of completing nutrition analyses, updating labeling, training employees, and developing new menu boards will be roughly 1 billion dollars. According to the FDA’s Center for Food Safety and Applied Nutrition, there are three elements of cost for this rule:

1. Collecting and managing nutritional analysis records;
2. Revising or replacing existing menus and menu boards; and
3. Employee training.

According to the FDA, 27% of restaurant chains have obtained the necessary nutrition analysis information for their menu items that comply with state and local regulations. These establishments will not experience additional expenses associated with compliance with national policy.

==== Vending Machines ====
Over 5 million vending machines, maintained by roughly 10,800 companies, will be required to comply with nutrition labeling regulations under section 4205. The FDA estimates the cost to display this information at $25.8 million initially, with an additional $24 million per year for subsequent upkeep.

=== Pre-existing Laws at the State and Local Level ===
Some states imposed nutrition labeling regulations prior to the enactment of the ACA. Section 4205 prohibits states from imposing nutrition labeling requirements that are different from or not included in section 4205.

The FDA’s proposed regulations in relationship to State and local laws:

- Prohibits State and local government from imposing different or additional requirements for food sold in covered establishments under Federal law;
- Enables State and local governments to establish nutrition labeling requirements for establishments not covered under Federal law.
