= Michael Monuteaux =

Michael Carl Monuteaux (born March 21, 1974) is a senior epidemiologist and biostatistician in the Division of Emergency Medicine at Boston Children's Hospital, as well as an assistant professor of pediatrics at Harvard Medical School. He specializes in research on the prevention of violent injuries, especially those resulting from the use of firearms. He graduated from Boston University and Harvard School of Public Health.
