= Charles R. Drew University of Medicine and Science =

Private university in Willowbrook, California, US

Coordinates: 33.925634°N 118.242594°W

- Motto: A Private University with a Public Mission
- Type: Private research university
- Established: 1966; 58 years ago
- Accreditation: WSCUC
- Academic affiliations: ASPPH; AAMC; NAICU; AICCU
- Endowment: $182 million
- President: David M. Carlisle
- Provost: Jose A. Torres-Ruiz
- Students: 949 (2024)
- Location: Los Angeles, California, United States
- Campus: Urban 11 acres (4.5 ha)
- Colors: Gold and black
- Mascot: Drew the Lion
- Website: www.cdrewu.edu

Charles R. Drew University of Medicine and Science (CDU) is a private research university in Willowbrook, California, focused on health sciences. It was founded in 1966 in response to inadequate medical access within the Watts region of Los Angeles, California. The university is named in honor of Charles R. Drew, a physician and medical researcher whose pioneering work in blood transfusion and blood banking during World War II laid the foundation for modern transfusion medicine. CDU is a federally designated Historically Black Graduate Institution, one of only four historically Black medical colleges in the United States and the only such institution west of the Mississippi.

== History ==
Charles R. Drew Postgraduate Medical School was incorporated in the State of California as a private, nonprofit educational institution in 1966 in response to the McCone Commission's recommendations to improve access to healthcare in South Los Angeles following the Watts Riots in 1965.

In January 1970, the offices of the Charles R. Drew Postgraduate Medical School and the Watts-Willowbrook Regional Medical program formally opened at 12012 Compton Avenue, and would serve as the central center for CDU's operations until the W.M. Cobb Building's construction in 1984. In 1973, Governor Ronald Reagan signed Senate Bill 1026 authored by State Senator Mervyn Dymally to allocate funding and support for the institution from the General Fund to the University of California.

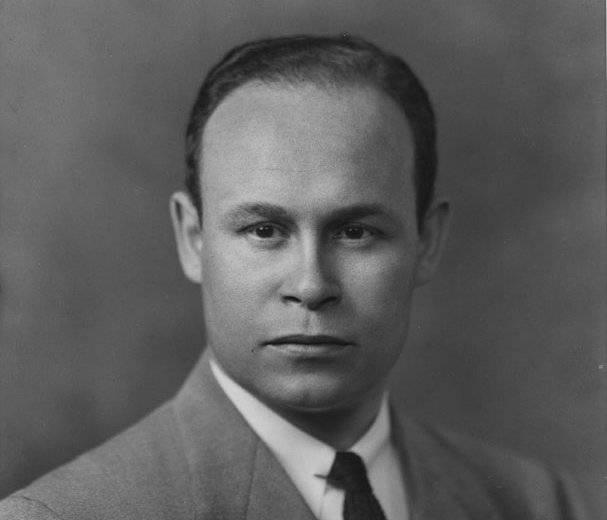
Dr. Charles R. Drew

In May 1978, the University of California Board of Regents approved the creation of the Drew - UCLA Medical Education Program (MEP), a joint pathway in which students complete their first two years of medical school at the David Geffen School of Medicine at UCLA and their final two years at Charles R. Drew University, including rotations at the Martin Luther King Jr. Outpatient Center and local community clinics near the CDU campus.The MEP was established with the mission of training physicians dedicated to social justice and health equity, particularly in underserved urban communities. After more than four decades of operation, the program began transitioning into the Urban Health Equity Pathway, with its final MEP cohort expected to graduate by 2027

The Mervyn M. Dymally College of Nursing opened in 2010. The school was the first comprehensive nursing program to open in Southern California in decades, and the first ever of its kind in South Los Angeles.

In 2010, the university introduced the Community Faculty Track, a unique model for community-academic partnerships in which community leaders are integrated into the university's research goals and the education of medical professionals.

In 2018, the school partnered with Ross University School of Medicine to educate doctors for South Los Angeles, since Charles R. Drew University typically receives more than 3,000 medical school applications, but only has space for 28 medical students each year.

In September 2020, Bloomberg Philanthropies made a $100 million donation to the four historically black medical schools in existence in the United States: Charles R. Drew University of Medicine and Science, Meharry Medical College, the Morehouse School of Medicine, and Howard University College of Medicine.

In February 2022, MacKenzie Scott made a $20 million, unrestricted donation to Charles R. Drew University of Medicine and Science, the largest private donation in the university's history.

In July 2023, after receiving provisional accreditation from the Liaison Committee on Medical Education (LCME), Charles R. Drew University enrolled the inaugural class of 60 students for its new, independent four-year Doctor of Medicine (MD) program. Full accreditation is contingent upon the graduation of its first class.

In 2024, Charles R. Drew University of Medicine & Science received a $75 million gift from Bloomberg Philanthropies to support the school's endowment.

== Campus ==
Charles R. Drew University of Medicine and Science is located in the Willowbrook neighborhood of South Los Angeles, on an 11-acre urban site adjacent to the Martin Luther King Jr. Community Hospital. The main campus includes classrooms, laboratories, the Gladys L. Dymally Simulation Center, and administrative offices that support the university’s three colleges.

In 2024, the university marked the topping off of the Health Professions Education Building, a 100,000-square-foot facility that will serve as the new home of the College of Medicine. The building, scheduled to open in 2026, will contain classrooms, anatomy laboratories, and collaborative spaces to support more than 240 medical students. Funded in part by a $50 million investment from the State of California, the project is expected to generate more than 700 jobs and over $80 million annually in economic activity for the surrounding community.

Across the street from the main campus, CDU and Los Angeles County are also developing the Wellness and Education Campus, a 12.8-acre mixed-use project on the site of the former Lincoln Elementary School. Planned to open in phases beginning in 2025–2026, the Wellness Campus will provide housing for graduate and undergraduate students, as well as affordable and workforce units, alongside an office building for nonprofit and educational use. The development will also include athletic and recreational facilities, retail space, and public promenades intended to serve both the university and the broader South Los Angeles community.

CDU maintains clinical partnerships throughout Los Angeles County, including rotations at Martin Luther King Jr. Community Hospital and other county health facilities, which provide the clinical education required for its Doctor of Medicine program and other health professional degrees.

== Presidents ==
Mitchell Spellman	1968–1977
David Satcher	1977–1979
M. Alfred Haynes	1979–1986
Walter F. Leavell	1986–1987
Henry Williams	1987–1991
Reed V. Tuckson	1991–1997
W. Benton Boone	1997–1998
Charles K. Francis	1998–2004
Harry E. Douglas	2004–2005
Thomas Yoshikawa	2005–2006
Susan Kelly	2006–2009
Keith C. Norris	2009–2010
M. Roy Wilson	2010–2011
David M. Carlisle	2011–present

== Academics ==
Through its three colleges, the College of Medicine, the College of Science and Health, and the Mervyn M. Dymally College of Nursing, Charles R. Drew University of Medicine and Science offers 18 academic programs focused on health professions and health equity. The university confers associate, bachelor’s, master’s, and doctoral degrees, as well as certificate and postbaccalaureate training programs. CDU is accredited by the Western Association of Schools and Colleges - Senior College and University Commission.

Doctoral degrees offered include the Doctor of Medicine (MD), Doctor of Nursing Practice (DNP), and doctoral-level training in biomedical and health sciences fields. Master's programs are available in disciplines such as Nursing, Public Health, Physician Assistant Studies, Genetic Counseling, and Biomedical Sciences. Bachelor’s degree programs include Nursing, Public Health, Biomedical Sciences, Radiologic Sciences, and Psychology with an emphasis in Community Counseling. An Associate of Science in Radiologic Technology is also offered.

=== Research ===
Research at CDU focuses on ways to address health disparities within the state of California, nationally, and globally. Research is organized around several health pillars, including cancer, cardiometabolic disease, HIV, mental health, and health services/health policy research. Research areas such as biostatistics and biomedical informatics cut across the five research pillars. In addition, the university has a Black Maternal Health Center of Excellence, established to address the crisis in health outcomes for Black mothers in the South Los Angeles, partially funded by a $9 million Health Resources and Services Administration (HRSA) grant.

Faculty and student researchers at CDU conduct ongoing NIH and DoD-funded research on conditions such as hypertension, diabetes, cancer, tobacco use and HIV/AIDs. CDU researchers have secured patents in fields such as cancer therapeutics, metabolic disease, e-cigarette health research, and behavioral health interventions. The university's Department of Research and Health Affairs was initially established as the Office of Research in 1973 to coordinate research activities and provide a focus for encouraging participation in laboratory work.

=== Physician Assistant program ===
The Physician Assistant program at the Charles R. Drew Postgraduate Medical School (now "CDU") began as MEDEX in 1971. It was one of the first MEDEX programs to open in the state of California.

MEDEX students at Drew received their instruction from physician faculty at UCLA until March 1973, when they moved to what was then known as the Martin Luther King Jr. General Hospital in Watts. The physician assistant program, which was originally an undergraduate program, returned to the university in August 2016 as a master's degree granting program after a five-year closure period that began in 2011.

=== Residency programs ===
In September 2017, the L.A. County Board of Supervisors voted to allocate $800,000 to CDU to fund two residency training programs in Family Medicine and Psychiatry. The funds were made available through a Pre-Medical School Affiliation Agreement signed between L.A. County and CDU in October 2017. A Medical School Affiliation Agreement between L.A. County Health Agency and CDU provides the programs with support of up to $14.6 million until 2023. Residents began their programs in Family Medicine and Psychiatry in July 2018, meaning that the university offered residency training as part of its curriculum for the first time since the closure of the former King-Drew Medical Center, and consequently the university's own training programs, in 2007.

=== Gladys L. Dymally Simulation Center ===
A cornerstone of the university's hands-on clinical training is the Gladys L. Dymally Simulation Center, a 7,000-square-foot facility that serves students from all three colleges. The center provides a realistic environment where students can develop and practice clinical and decision-making skills without risk to patients. It features a range of simulated healthcare environments, including an intensive care unit, operating room, labor and delivery suite, and clinical exam rooms. Training is facilitated through high-fidelity human patient simulators, task trainers, and standardized patients (actors), all recorded by an advanced audio-visual system for detailed debriefing sessions.

=== Affiliations and designations ===
CDU is recognized as a minority-serving institution by the U.S. Office for Civil Rights, as well as a historically black graduate institution under the U.S. Department of Education's Strengthening Historically Black Graduate Institutions Program, also known as Title III B. The university is also a member of the Hispanic Association of Colleges and Universities and the Thurgood Marshall College Fund.

== Student body ==
CDU has a total enrollment of 949 students, the majority of whom are at the graduate and professional levels. The student population is divided among its three colleges: 471 in the College of Nursing, 306 in the College of Science and Health, and 122 in the College of Medicine. Approximately 69% of students are female and 31% are male.

The university's student body is predominantly drawn from the local community, a key part of its mission to serve the surrounding area. 92.2% of incoming students are from California, with 69.9% coming from Los Angeles County specifically. CDU is one of the most diverse universities in the nation, with a student body that is 31.1% Black or African American, 16% Hispanic, 15.7% from two or more races, and 14.6% Asian.

Reflecting its focus on training practicing professionals, the student population is older on average than at traditional universities, with an average undergraduate age of 29 and an average graduate student age of 35. The university's commitment to social justice and health equity is evident in its student outcomes; more than 85% of students report they intend to practice in underserved communities following graduation. Since its founding in 1966, the university has graduated more than 600 physicians, 1,300 physician assistants, and over 4,000 other health professionals, creating a significant impact on the healthcare landscape of Southern California and beyond.

== Association with Martin Luther King Jr. Community Hospital ==
Martin Luther King Jr.-Harbor Hospital closed in 2007 after a loss of accreditation and longstanding quality-of-care problems. The closure forced the end of several residency programs and severed the hospital’s affiliation with Charles R. Drew University, disrupting training for hundreds of medical residents.

In 2007, the university filed a $125 million lawsuit against Los Angeles County, arguing that the hospital’s downsizing had undermined its mission. The case was settled in 2009, with the county agreeing to provide CDU with favorable rental terms and to collaborate on efforts to reopen the hospital.

In 2015, the new Martin Luther King Jr. Community Hospital opened on the same hospital campus. Unlike its predecessor, it is a private, nonprofit hospital operating under a new governance model. It has re-established an affiliation with the university and serves as a clinical training site for the university’s medical and health sciences students.

== Notable people ==
Notable past and present Charles R. Drew University faculty members include Patricia Bath, an ophthalmologist and the first black female doctor to receive a medical patent, for inventing a laser treatment for cataracts and Deborah Prothrow-Stith, a pioneer in addressing youth violence as a public health issue and the first woman commissioner of public health for the Commonwealth of Massachusetts. Prothrow-Stith is professor of internal medicine and current dean of the College of Medicine. Calvin Johnson (anesthesiologist) served as dean of the College of Medicine from 2001 to 2002.

== See also ==
- King/Drew Magnet High School of Medicine and Science — adjacent
- History of African Americans in Los Angeles
- South Los Angeles-related topics
- African American student access to medical schools
