= Max Iheanachor =

Nigerian-American football player (born 2003)

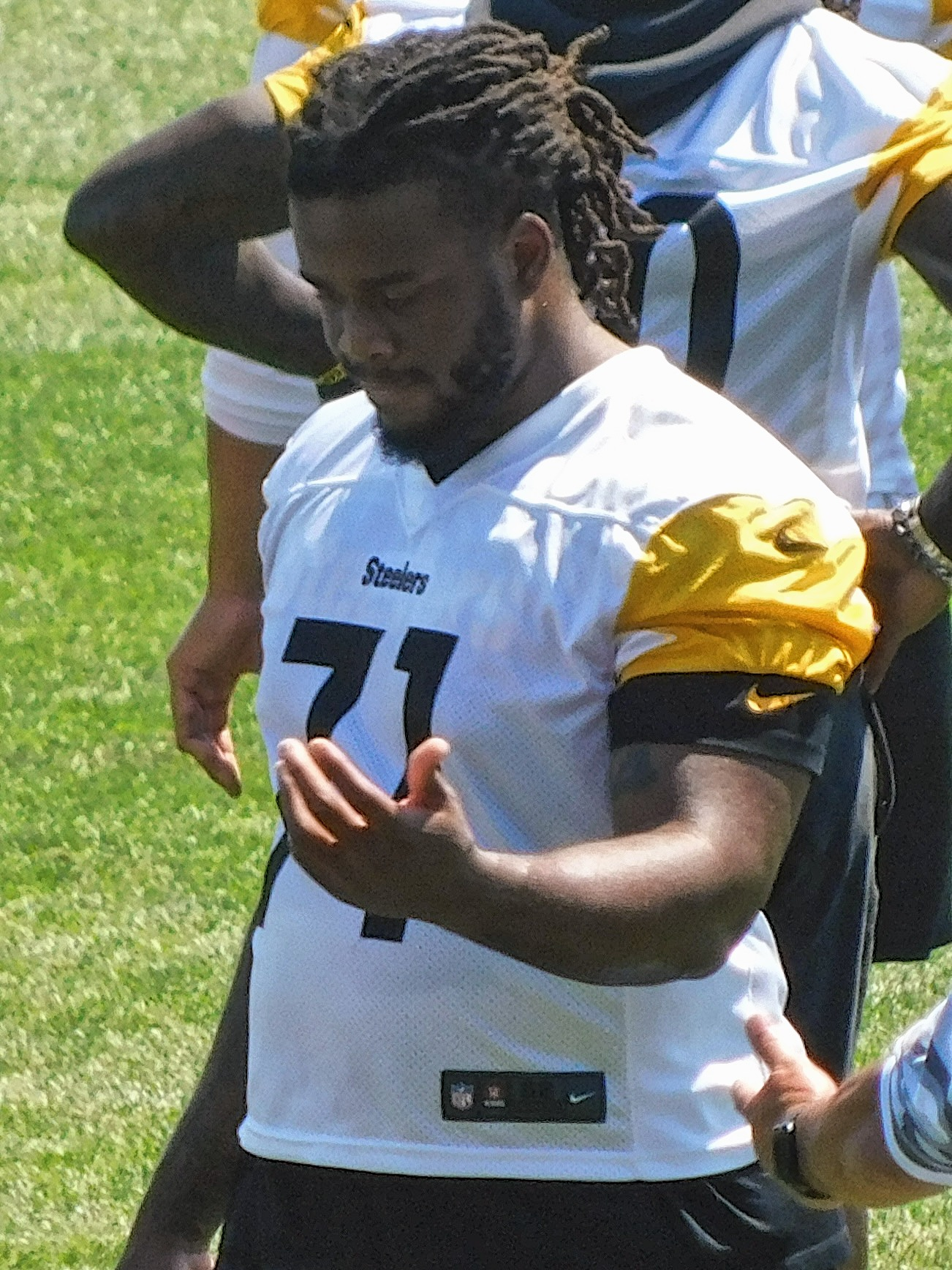
- Iheanachor with the Pittsburgh Steelers in 2026

No. 71 – Pittsburgh Steelers
- Position: Offensive tackle
- Roster status: Active

Personal information
- Born: October 19, 2003 (age 23); Nigeria
- Listed height: 6 ft 6 in (1.98 m)
- Listed weight: 321 lb (146 kg)

Career information
- High school: King/Drew (Willowbrook, California, U.S.)
- College: East Los Angeles (2021–2022); Arizona State (2023–2025)
- NFL draft: 2026: 1st round, 21st overall pick

Career history
- Pittsburgh Steelers (2026–present)

Awards and highlights
- Second-team All-Big 12 (2025)

Career NFL statistics as of Week 4, 2026
- Games played: 4
- Games started: 2
- Stats at Pro Football Reference

Maxwell Iheanachor (ee-HAW-nuh-chore; born October 19, 2003) is a Nigerian-American professional football offensive tackle for the Pittsburgh Steelers of the National Football League (NFL). He played college football for East Los Angeles College and the Arizona State Sun Devils and was selected by the Steelers in the first round of the 2026 NFL draft.

== Early life ==
Iheanachor was born in Nigeria, and moved to the United States at the age of 13. He attended King/Drew Magnet High School of Medicine and Science, where he played soccer and basketball. Despite never playing football, he enrolled at East Los Angeles College to play college football.

== College career ==
=== East Los Angeles College ===
Iheanachor spent his first two seasons at East Los Angeles College from 2021 to 2022. Iheanachor initially played tight end before switching to offensive lineman. In 2022, Iheanachor started at both left and right tackle. On3 Sports rated Iheanachor as the No. 16 overall JUCO prospect in the class of 2023.

=== Arizona State ===
In February 2023, Iheanachor signed to play college football for the Arizona State Sun Devils. He made his first collegiate start in week three of the 2023 season versus Fresno State. That season, Iheanachor appeared in six games with five starts. Iheanachor became a full-time starter in 2024, making all 14 starts on the Sun Devils' offensive line. In 2025, he was named second-team all-Big 12.

== Professional career ==
Pre-draft measurables
Height	Weight	Arm length	Hand span	Wingspan	40-yard dash	10-yard split	20-yard split	Vertical jump	Broad jump	Bench press
6 ft 5 7/8 in (1.98 m)	321 lb (146 kg)	33 7/8 in (0.86 m)	9 in (0.23 m)	6 ft 11 1/4 in (2.11 m)	4.91 s	1.73 s	2.87 s	30.5 in (0.77 m)	9 ft 7 in (2.92 m)	25 reps
All values from NFL Combine

Iheanachor was selected by the Pittsburgh Steelers in the first round, 21st overall, of the 2026 NFL draft.

He made his first NFL start on September 27, 2026.
