= Watts Labor Community Action Committee =

American non-profit organization

The Watts Labor Community Action Committee (WLCAC) is a non-profit, 501 (c) 3 organization incorporated in the State of California, in 1965. Its mission "is to improve the quality of life for the residents of Watts and neighboring communities."

The WLCAC was established by Ted Watkins, who was part of the United Automobile Workers Union shortly before the Watts riots in 1965 Watts, California.

Theodore Watkins, better known as Ted Watkins, founded the Watts Labor Community Action Committee. Watkins was born in Meridian, Mississippi in 1912. He moved to Los Angeles, California at the age of 13 after receiving a lynch threat, and soon began working for Ford Motor Company. Shortly thereafter he joined the United Auto Workers, quickly gaining prominence within the union. Throughout his years of involvement with the local chapter of the United Auto Workers, Watkins witnessed many instances of discrimination towards workers in the community. Eventually, with the help of the United Auto Workers, he founded the Watts Labor Community Action Committee. It grew to prominence as a community self-help agency aiding thousands of residents in gaining employment and essential services.

Through the WLCAC, Watkins initiated various programs aimed at alleviating poverty in Watts and generally improving the quality of life for members of the community. During his lifetime, Watkins was involved in the construction of a financial institution and hospital in Watts, as well as the development of low-income housing and youth programs. Following the 1981 riots in London, England, the British prime minister contacted Watkins to fly out to London and help the British government by applying methods used by the WLCAC in the aftermath of the Watts riots. Aided by the relationships he was able to form with public officials and policymakers, Watkins implemented a multitude of programs through the WLCAC.

Right before his death in 1993, Watkins helped to rebuild the WLCAC after it was burned down in the Los Angeles riots of 1992.

== Organization ==
WLCAC was initiated largely due to the absence of essential infrastructure in the Watts neighborhood of Los Angeles such as: Intra-community transportation, housing, senior programs, employment training, job placement, homeless services, health services, and businesses. Watts lacked an advocate to advance concerns regarding the high unemployment rates, poverty, and inadequate living conditions.

The WLCAC's headquarters is located at 109th and Central Avenue in Watts, California.

=== War on Poverty ===
The War on Poverty, proposed by Lyndon B. Johnson to address the national poverty rate of about nineteen percent, led to the creation of the Economic Opportunity Act, which then established the Office of Economic Opportunity (OEO) to administer the local application of federal funds targeted against poverty. OEO was created to fix the high unemployment rates rising in poverty areas. But from "1965 until 1970, OEO scrambled for an average of about $1.7 billion per year" which "the amounts never amounted to more than around 1.5 percent of the federal budget." The War on Poverty failed to provide the funds and services it promised to areas such as Watts, which led to the creation of many local programs to aid their communities.

=== Formation ===
The significant challenges in unemployment, housing, transportation and low education levels of the Watts area highlighted the urgent need for an effective community organization in the Watts area. By 1965, the unemployment rate in the Watts area escalated to "10.7 percent, compared to only 4.2 percent for the city as a whole."

In the summer of 1965, under the leadership of Ted Watkins, local activists and labor union representatives officially founded WLCAC. UAW was instrumental in the creation of the WLCAC as UAW president Walter Reuther and western regional director Paul Schrade "helped build a core of support for the new organization." They saw the war on poverty as an "opportunity in which long-standing policies and practices were open to question and change" and believed that the way to "create change…is by building community organizations."

To further emphasize the crisis in Watts, the Watts Riots in August 1965 led the federal and local governments as well as private organizations to pay attention to the inadequate living conditions and lack of federal and local support in the Los Angeles area. It is alleged that those who participated in the Watts Rebellion "were prompted as much by unemployment, bad housing, and lack of decent education" as they were by the mistreatment of the "white-dominated LAPD."

=== Ted Watkins ===
Watkins was born in Meridian, Mississippi, in 1923. At the age of fifteen he moved to the Los Angeles area in flight from a lynch mob that targeted him for allegedly disobeying a white resident. After high school, Watkins landed a job on the assembly line at the Ford Motor Company. There he joined the local chapter of the UAW and in 1949 became the "international representative for UAW." Aside from union activities, Watkins also involved himself "in various civil rights organizations, including the Watts chapter of the NAACP and the United Civil Rights Committee." These programs protested against poor housing conditions and the lack of services in inner-city Los Angeles. Watkins active participation made him an adequate candidate to lead the WLCAC. When, in 1966, UAW sought a leader for the WLCAC, Watkins had the experience and organizational skills to lead the Watts community.

Two main objectives Watkins sought to accomplish was the establishment of a hospital and a financial institution. The necessity for a hospital near the Watts area prompted Watkins to work with County Supervisor Kenneth Hahn to build community support for the construction of a local hospital. As a result, the Martin Luther King Jr.-Harbor Hospital in Willowbrook, California was built in 1972.

== Funding ==
From its establishment, WLCAC had an advisory board composed of major labor unions that provided financial assistance. In specific the labor unions consisted of the United Auto Workers (UAW), the Amalgamated Clothing Workers of America, Building Service Employees, the International Association of Machinists, the Teamsters, the International Longshoremen and Warehousemen, United Packinghouse Workers, and others. These unions alone "contributed a combined $100,000" the first two years of WLCAC existence.

In 1971, WLCAC utilized a $2 million loan from UAW-Chrysler to purchase property in order to expand on the initial "thirty homes built with funds from the state of California." In addition, grants from the Ford Foundation served as a great contribution to the organization. The money from the Ford Foundation grant went "to pay administrators and project staff and also to establish a Minority Enterprise Small Business Investment Corporation." As a non-profit, 501 (c) 3 organization, WLCAC continues to compete for and administer awarded funds from various programs at the City, County, State and federal and local level.

== Current activities ==
The WLCAC campus centers around WLCAC's main headquarters, which include a youth center, employment training programs, family wellness programs, as well as the Ted Watkins Center for Communications, which includes a theater, galleries, exhibition spaces, and civil rights history museum. Within a 1-mile radius are additional sites providing senior and child care services, permanent supportive housing, employment training and more.

In April 2012, California State Parks announced the award to WLCAC of $4.9 Million in Proposition 84 grant funds for a new urban farm park and community center in Watts. The urban farm park is named MudTown Farms in honor of the historic name for the area, MudTown. It is a self-sustaining community center with education, job training, community gardening, farming, and entrepreneurship for stakeholders of all ages and backgrounds. Construction on the project is slated to begin in 2017.

Today, WLCAC employs more than 200 local residents, with an annual operating budget of approximately $10 million.

== Subsidiaries ==
The Greater Watts Development Corporation was formed to move homes affected by the construction of the Century Freeway (Interstate 105), which began in 1981, to Watts as part of a low-income home ownership program in partnership with the City of Los Angeles.

== The Center ==
Watts Labor Community Action Committee in the Present Day Today the Watts Labor Community Action Committee is headed by Tim Watkins, son of the late Ted Watkins. A seven-acre complex located in Watts dubbed "The Center" serves as its hub. According to the WLCAC's website, the Center is meant to "dispel and redefine misperceptions" about Watts. The facility is used as an administrative center for staff as well as a tourist attraction, showcasing various permanent and temporary exhibits throughout the year.

The main exhibit at the Center is the three-part Civil Rights Tour. The tour features a scale model slave-hold as well as an array of photographs memorializing the Civil Rights Movement. It features the photographic collections Countdown to Eternity by Benedict Fernandez, The Panthers by Howard Bingham, a sixteen and a half foot bronze statue by Nigel Binns named The Mother of Humanity, and an exhibit named "Americana: The Hall of Shame" that contains images and documentation of "the unauthorized commoditization of the Black Image." According to the Watts Labor Community Action Committee's website, "Americana: The Hall of Shame" is meant to "expose the uses of these images as an extension of slavery." There are also multiple murals displayed, including The Resurrection of Watts by Ras Ammar Nsoroma, Concrete Jungle by Richard Franco and Toni Love, Space Station by Richard Arturo, and Danny Franco, Mound Bayou by PeQue, BrowHands by Rondell, Malcolm X and Muhammad Ali by EnkOne, Central Avenue Jazz by an unknown artist and Community Heroes by Elliot Pinkney.

Apart from a multitude of permanent exhibits that can be viewed year-round, the WLCAC has built a number of facilities at the Center that cater to community members of Watts and the surrounding cities within South Los Angeles. The Center includes a play space named "Kaboom" as well as a skate park, and even holds arts classes for kids. The Howard Bingham Multimedia Institute is open to people of all ages, and allows community members access to technology they can utilize for a variety of purposes. For the more artistically inclined, the Cecil Fergerson Gallery provides a space for artists and art viewers to convene and hold exhibits, signings, lectures, or any other type of gathering. The gallery is located in the Ted Watkins Center for International Communication, a thirty-five thousand square foot building that also includes Phoenix Hall, a theatre, and Freedom Hall. The Universal Access Theatre provides a variety of resources for young people, including laundry machines, computers with internet, help with phone calls/mail to potential employers, snacks, games, books and magazines, an entertainment system, as well as tutoring, mentoring, and counseling. The Watts International Marketplace houses studios for embroidery, silk-screening, ceramics, fine arts, glass blowing, wood working, and photography. The Watts Labor Community Action Committee is currently developing a retail restaurant, library, and farmer's market for the marketplace. On the last Friday of every month, the Center holds Bones and Blues in its Phoenix Hall. This event presents adult residents with live music as well as other performances.

== Housing ==
The Dolores McCoy Villa I housing complex for homeless families was created in 2011 by the partnership between the Watts Labor Community Action Committee and Affordable Housing CDC Inc. The project was funded by a $3 million loan by the PSP Lending Program and the California Community Reinvestment Fund. The sixty-four unit complex is located near the intersection of 92nd Street and Compton Avenue, not far from the WLCAC center itself. It provides housing for tenants earning less than 60% of the median income (other source says 30%, 35%, and 50%) in the surrounding area. The housing complex Housing Authority of the City of Los Angeles' Permanent Supportive Housing Program receives Section 8 rental subsidies for each unit, and rent is 30% of tenants' household incomes. The Dolores McCoy Villa was created with homeless people as well as the formerly incarcerated in mind, given that certain housing practices prevent formerly incarcerated people from eligibility. The website states that the project was developed in an effort to provide "much needed housing and on-site support services for single mothers re-entering the community after being incarcerated." According to the General Board of Pension and Health Benefits of the United States' website, The Dolores McCoy Villa provides various services to its residents, including case management, financial management, employment training and placement, academic counseling, access to health care, substance abuse services and other opportunities focused on families and independent living skills.

The Watts Labor Community Action Committee provides an array of services for the community members of Watts and surrounding South Los Angeles aimed at alleviating poverty and fostering economic growth.

The WLCAC also funds a number of programs for youth and their families. Among these are The Greater Watts Child Care Center, which provides low-cost childcare; the Family Source Center, which provides social services such as job training and health services among many others; Gang Reduction and Youth Development, which provides preventative programs for younger members of the community; WorkSource center, which provides employment training, support placement and retention services for thousands of job seekers and multiple local employers.

The WLCAC operates a senior citizen program providing recreational activities, educational programs, health screenings, field trips, day care, in-home care, transportation and escort assistance for shopping or medical appointments, and referrals to other social service providers. It also includes a program that delivers meals to senior at its satellite sites.
