= Elaine Batchlor =

American rheumatologist

- Born: Maryland, US

Academic background
- Education: Harvard University (BA); University of California, Los Angeles (MPH); Case Western Reserve University (MD)

Elaine E. Batchlor is an American rheumatologist. She is the CEO of Martin Luther King Jr. Community Hospital and a member of the National Academy of Medicine.

== Early life and education ==
Batchlor is a native of Maryland. Growing up, her parents were politically active in the Civil rights movement and she attended the People's March on Washington. Due to her race, Batchlor was shunned by neighbors, so she spent much of her time by herself at the library. She completed her Bachelor of Arts degree from Harvard University, a Master's degree in Public Health from the University of California, Los Angeles (UCLA), and her medical degree from Case Western Reserve University. In 2017, she was awarded the Lester Breslow Lifetime Achievement Award from UCLA and inducted into their Hall of Fame.

== Career ==
Upon completing her medical degree, Batchlor was a clinical instructor at the David Geffen School of Medicine at UCLA. She also served in leadership positions at the California HealthCare Foundation, the Los Angeles County Department of Health Services, Prudential Health Care, and Ross Loos Medical Group. In 2012, Batchlor was appointed the chief executive officer of the Martin Luther King Jr. Community Hospital (MLKCH). Prior to joining MLKCH, she had served as chief medical officer of L.A. Care Health Plan, a public health plan that covers underserved Los Angeles County residents. She also helped establish the MLK Community Medical Group, a nonprofit medical group that aims to fund recruitment of top doctors to work in South Los Angeles. As a result of her efforts, Batchlor was the recipient of the 2015 Woman of the Year Award from the Women in Health Administration of Southern California. She was also recognized as the 2017 Humanitarian of the Year by the Association of Black Women Physicians in recognition of her work to increasing healthcare access for underserved communities.

In 2019, Batchlor helped launch MLKCH's first medical residency program. She was later recognized by the National Academy of Medicine for "her leadership in improving access and quality care for underserved communities, as chief medical officer for the nation’s largest public health plan and as a driving force as founding CEO of the state-of-the-art Martin Luther King Jr. Community Hospital in a deeply underserved section of Los Angeles." She also received the 2019 James Irvine Foundation Leadership Award for being an "innovative, effective leader whose breakthrough solutions to critical state challenges improved people’s lives, created opportunity, and contributed to a better California."

During the COVID-19 pandemic, Batchlor was named to the Insure the Uninsured Project Board of Directors. She was also recognized as a Women of Influence by the Los Angeles Business Journal.

In July 2022, she was appointed to the Regents of the University of California by Governor Gavin Newsom.

== Personal life ==
Batchlor is married to an attorney and they have two children together.
