= Partnership HealthPlan of California =

Healthcare organization

Agency overview
- Formed: May 1, 1994; 32 years ago
- Type: County Organized Health System
- Headquarters: 4665 Business Center Drive, Fairfield, CA 94534-1675; 38°13′17.172″N 122°8′.992″W
- Motto: Together for your Health
- Employees: 1000
- Annual budget: US$2,800,000,000 (2022)
- Agency executives: Sonja Bjork, Chief Executive Officer; Robert Moore, MD MPH MBA, Chief Medical Officer; Wendi West, Chief Operating Officer; Patti McFarland, Chief Financial Officer
- Website: www.partnershiphp.org

Partnership HealthPlan of California is an independent, public/private organization serving over 950,000 Medi-Cal beneficiaries in 24 northern California counties: Butte County, Colusa County, Del Norte County, Humboldt County, Glenn County, Lake County, Lassen County, Marin County, Mendocino County, Modoc County, Napa County, Nevada County, Placer County, Plumas County, Shasta County, Sierra County, Siskiyou County, Solano County, Sonoma County, Sutter County, Tehama County, Trinity County, Yolo County, Yuba County. It began operations as a County Organized Health System in 1994, and is currently the largest Medi-Cal Managed Care Plan in Northern California.

== Company description ==
Partnership HealthPlan of California is authorized by the State of California to provide health care services for Medi-Cal managed care beneficiaries in 24 Northern California counties.

== Coverage programs ==
- Medi-Cal. California's version of Medicaid is the only public program that covers many low-income adults and children.

Other coverage programs have been included in the past:

- 2002–2005 County Medical Services Program (CMSP) program (Solano and Napa counties).
- 2007–2014 PartnershipAdvantage, a Special Needs Plan Medicare Advantage program (Yolo, Napa, Solano counties only)
- 2010–2013 Healthy Families, the California version of the federal Children's Health Insurance Program (Napa, Sonoma, Solano, Yolo counties only). In 2013, the Healthy Families Program was folded into Medi-Cal as part of the Affordable Care Act.
- 2005–2016 Healthy Kids. Partnership HealthPlan also offered a health insurance product called Healthy Kids to low income children not otherwise eligible for Medi-Cal. In 2016, the Healthy Kids Program was folded into Medi-Cal under California's SB 75, passed in 2015.

== History and structure ==
In 1993, the State Department of Health Services produced a report entitled “Expanding Medi-Cal Managed Care: Reforming the Health System – Protecting Vulnerable Populations” which served as a blueprint for expansion of Medi-Cal managed care.

The Solano Health Partnership, the predecessor of Partnership HealthPlan, began serving Medi-Cal beneficiaries in Solano County in 1994 as a County Organized Health System. The Solano Coalition for Better Health, a community stakeholder group, founded Partnership HealthPlan. The Coalition began discussing overall health of the Solano County community in 1988 culminating in a contract with the State of California in 1992, beginning operations in 1994.

In 1998, the Solano Health Partnership expanded into Napa County, and changed its name to Partnership HealthPlan of California. Further geographic expansions are listed

- 2001 Expansion to Yolo County
- 2009 Expansion to Sonoma County
- 2011 Expansion to Marin and Mendocino Counties
- 2013 Expansion to Del Norte, Humboldt, Lake, Lassen, Modoc, Shasta, Siskiyou, and Trinity counties
- 2024 Expansion to Butte, Colusa, Glenn, Nevada, Placer, Plumas, Sierra, Sutter, Tehama, and Yuba counties

The founding Chief Executive Officer was Jack Horn, who retired in 2015.

== Notable programs ==
- Expanding Access to Safe Obstetrical Care.
- Managing Pain Safely, reducing opioid overuse.
- Offering and Honoring Choices, promoting advance care planning and palliative care.
- Telehealth
- EConsult
- Social determinants of health
- Wellness and Recovery Program (Substance use disorder services for seven counties) Launched 2020.

== Governance ==
Partnership HealthPlan is governed by a board of commissions composed of up to 40 members representing all 24 counties, including physicians, county officials, hospital leaders, providers, PHC health plan members, and public representatives.

== See also ==
- Health care
- L.A. Care Health Plan
- Association for Community Affiliated Plans
