= Velma Grant =

American housing developer (1899–1984)

Velma Grant in 1950

Velma Grant (1899–1984) was a housing developer in the United States after World War II. She was responsible for over 600 houses being built in different California subdivisions including the Carverdale development in San Bernardino and the Paul R. Williams-designed Carver Manor in Willowbrook (Los Angeles County). She built middle-class homes specifically for black Americans to buy because redlining was preventing them from home ownership in the post-WWII era.

== Business career ==
A 1949 profile of Grant in Time laid out the genesis for her housing development and construction career:

"In spite of her Louisiana upbringing, Mrs. Grant sympathizes with the U.S. Negro’s indignation at the unwritten laws which force him, in most communities, to buy only rundown houses in rundown districts. Four years ago, as a broker in a big Los Angeles real-estate firm, she took a call from another broker asking about a new house. Asked Mrs. Grant: “Is your client a Caucasian?” The answer from the caller, a Negro, was cold and angry: “No she’s not, and neither am I!”.

Grant secured a $100,000 ($1.35 million in 2025) loan to buy 50 acres in the Willowbrook area of Los Angeles County where she was going to have Carver Manor built. She then got a construction loan of $2,290,000 ($31 million in 2025) from Bank of America. She engaged the architect Paul R. Williams to design the overall development and the various house plans. Though at the time, he had millions of dollars in construction at hand, Williams' fee for the Carver Manor designs was only $3200 ($43,301 in 2025). 110 homes out of the 250 initially built there sold on the first day the development went on the market. 33 more houses were built plus a shopping center for a Carver Manor annex. Grant also was responsible for the $2 million Carverdale project in San Bernardino. (Note: The Los Angeles Examiner article of September 1949 states that William Bray (not Paul R. Williams) was the architect of the Carverdale subdivision in San Bernardino.) In 1950 Grant was named the top women's residential tract builder by the National Association of Home Builders. The profile in Time magazine stated that Grant had made a profit of $250,000 ($3.38 million in 2025) on her developments. She continued her development business in Long Beach, California, subdividing a 75 acre tract into 405 home lots in 1951.

Grant moved to Arizona in the early 1950s and purchased a 1,900 acre ranch that she called the "Rafter B". She intended to raise cattle there but instead turned to raising cotton.

== Personal life ==
Velma Grant's son Robert Elon Cleveland was born in 1920. By 1940, the Federal Census had Grant listed as being a saleswoman in real estate. She was a high-school graduate and divorced. Her son Robert was living with her in Los Angeles. In the 1950 Census it is also stated that she was divorced, working as a "subdivider" in "real estate subdivision", and was living in Arcadia in Los Angeles County. By the late 1950s Grant was living in Phoenix, Arizona. A 1959 obituary for Grant's mother Rutha Read lists their residence as Phoenix, Arizona as did Grant's testimony in 1960 before a Congressional subcommittee. (Note: Contrary to some published information, Velma Grant was probably not African American. Grant, her parents, and her sisters are listed as "white" in the 1910 Federal Census, the 1940 Federal Census has her listed as being white along with her son Robert). Robert's 1941 Draft Card has him listed as being blonde, blue-eyed, and white. In the 1950 Federal Census, Grant is listed as being white and she is characterized as "white" in a 1951 Los Angeles Tribune article. Nowhere in contemporary accounts is Grant described - in that era's terms - as being African American.)
