= Martin Luther King Jr. Community Hospital =

- Martin Luther King Jr. – Los Angeles Healthcare Corporation (MLK-LA)

Geography
- Location: 1680 120th Street; Willowbrook, Los Angeles; Los Angeles County, California, United States
- Coordinates: 33.923229°N 118.243737°W

Organization
- Care system: Private, Nonprofit
- Type: Community
- Affiliated university: University of California, Los Angeles

Services
- Beds: 130

History
- Founded: 2013, opened 2015

Links
- Website: www.mlkch.org
- Lists: Hospitals in California

Martin Luther King Jr. Community Hospital, also known as MLK-LA, is a 131-bed public community hospital in the unincorporated Willowbrook neighborhood of southern Los Angeles County, California, just outside of the Los Angeles city limits. It was planned and designed to especially serve the surrounding South Los Angeles communities' needs, including those of underinsured or uninsured patients.

The hospital opened on July 7, 2015, in a new US$208,500,000 building. The hospital on the site of the former Martin Luther King Jr. Multi-Service Ambulatory Care Center, originally named the Martin Luther King Jr./Drew Medical Center, known as King/Drew. The adjacent Los Angeles County Department of Health Services Martin Luther King Jr. Outpatient Center opened in a new building in 2014.

== History ==
The closure of Martin Luther King Jr. Multi-Service Ambulatory Care Center in 2007, due to revocation of federal funding after the hospital failed a comprehensive review by the U.S. Centers for Medicare & Medicaid Services, had immediate ramifications in the South Los Angeles area, which was left without a major hospital providing indigent care.

In 2009, the County of Los Angeles successfully negotiated with the University of California to reach a compromise, whereby the county would provide funding for construction of a replacement hospital, and the UC system would provide physician staffing. A nonprofit foundation, the Martin Luther King Jr. – Los Angeles Healthcare Corporation, was established to administer the hospital.

== Administration ==
The hospital is administered by Martin Luther King Jr. – Los Angeles Healthcare Corporation (MLK-LA), a private nonprofit organization. The County of Los Angeles provided the capital funds for construction, and the University of California, Los Angeles healthcare system provides professional services and staffing.

In August 2012, MLK-LA's Board appointed Elaine Batchlor, a physician and former chief medical officer for L.A. Care Health Plan, as the hospital's first chief executive officer.

== Operations ==
The hospital provides general acute care, basic emergency services, labor and delivery services, health education and outreach programs, along with other services typically provided by community hospitals, including radiology, laboratory, and blood bank services.

The hospital serves a low income community where almost all the residents are African American and Latino. South LA has the lowest number of hospital beds per 100,000 people of any area in Los Angeles County. As a low-income community, the main system of funding healthcare is Medicaid, which is known as Medi-Cal in California and which pays providers very low rates.

== Transportation ==
The hospital has walking distance access to the Metro A Line and Metro C Line stations, as well as Gardena Transit and LADOT DASH buses.

== See also ==
- Charles R. Drew University of Medicine and Science – adjacent.
- King Drew Magnet High School of Medicine and Science – adjacent.
- King Drew Hospital, Martin Luther King Jr. Multi-Service Ambulatory Care Center – predecessors on site.
- History of the African-Americans in Los Angeles
- South Los Angeles-related topics
