= Western Dental =

American chain of dental offices

- Founded: 1903; 123 years ago in Los Angeles
- Headquarters: Orange, California, United States
- Area served: California, Arizona, Nevada, and Texas
- Products: Dentistry, orthodontics
- Number of employees: More than 4,500 (2017)
- Website: www.westerndental.com

Western Dental & Orthodontics (commonly known as Western Dental) is a chain of dental offices based in Orange, California, United States. It was founded in 1903 in Los Angeles. Western Dental has almost 250 offices in California, Arizona, Nevada, and Texas, making it one of the largest dental service providers in the United States. Up to 70% of its California patients are covered under the state's Denti-Cal health insurance program for low-income families.

In 1997 the Los Angeles Times reported on "recent accusations by state regulators" that Western Dental was providing “shoddy, dangerous” medical care to patients, as well as accusations that the company was operating a "low-quality dental mill" in which dentists were encouraged to over-treat patients to maximize profits. Later in the article the Times added that Western "has a decade-long history of run-ins with regulators over its medical care.". A 2010 article by local news channel ABC13 describes "lifetime injuries" patients experienced at Western Dental, with one woman left with a severed nerve after having a tooth pulled. Two other patients cited in the article had all their teeth pulled and replaced with dentures by Western Dental, only to be told later by another dentist that their teeth had actually been healthy and did not need to be pulled. The article also notes Western Dental was forced to pay a $1.2 million fine in 1996, with the California Department of Corporations accusing Western Dental of "consistent disregard for quality of care and patient health".

== Modern Operations and Community Scope ==
By 2026, Western Dental grew to become the largest provider of Medi-Cal Dental services in the state of California, coordinating care for over 2 million patients annually across its network. The organization operates over 220 offices across 35 counties and employs more than 4,000 clinical and administrative staff, including over 750 dentists and hygienists.

To expand its clinical offerings, the provider established a strategic initiative with the Straumann Group to integrate global implant, crown, and specialized aesthetic technologies across its locations. The organization regularly interfaces with state health infrastructure and regional health programs to maintain dental benefit access for low-income and underserved populations across its multi-state footprint.
