= Magic Johnson Park =

Park in Willowbrook neighborhood of Los Angeles County, California

- Earvin “Magic” Johnson Recreation Area
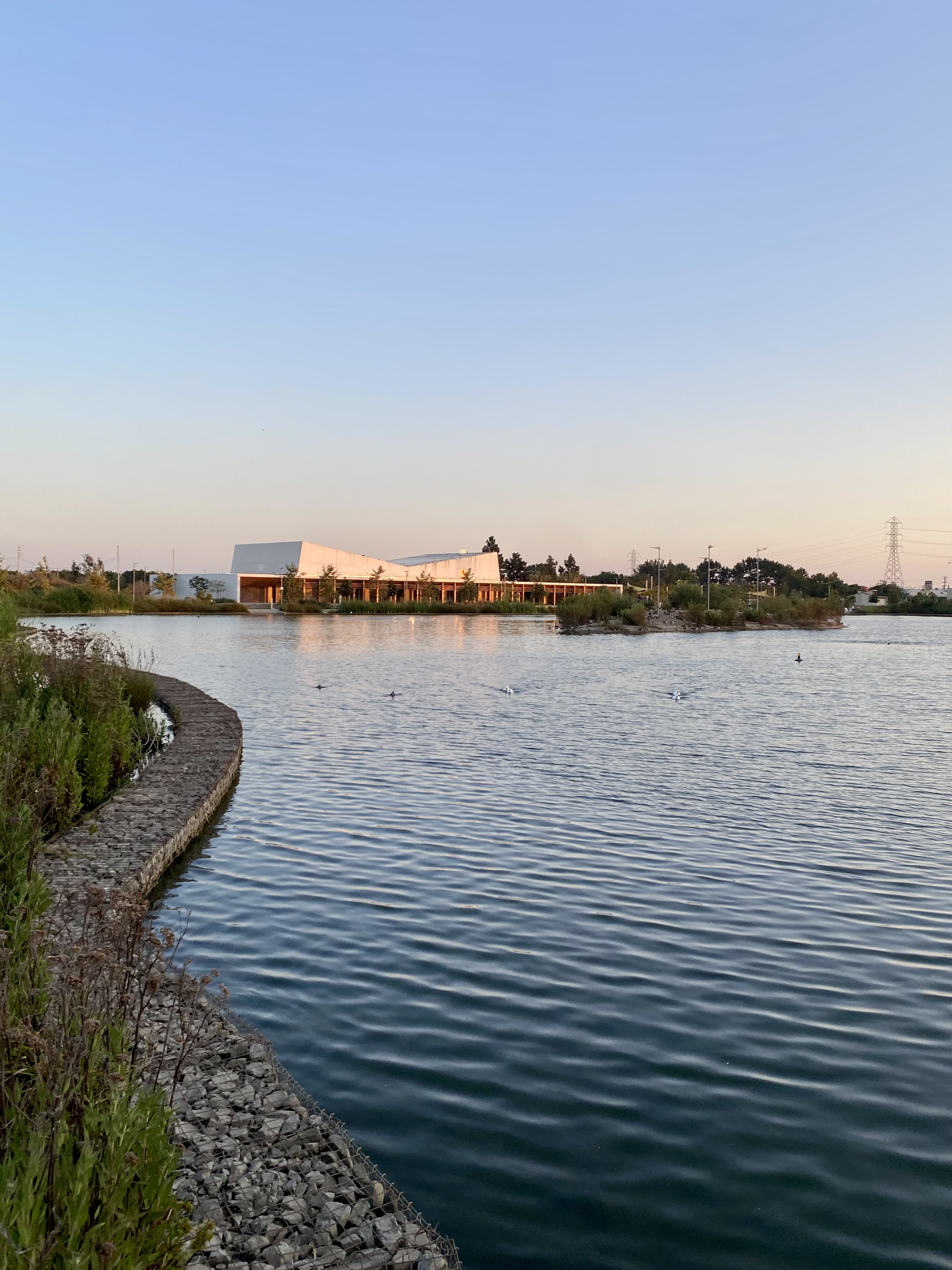
- Lake and community center
- Interactive map of Magic Johnson Park
- Location: 905 E El Segundo Blvd, Los Angeles, CA 90059
- Coordinates: 33.9236°N 118.2577°W
- Area: 104 areas
- Parking: Free parking lots
- Website: https://parks.lacounty.gov/earvin-magic-johnson-recreation-area/

Magic Johnson Park is a 104-acre (420,000 m^{2}) recreation area operated by Los Angeles County Parks and Recreation in the Willowbrook neighborhood. Formerly known as Willowbrook Recreation Center, it was renamed after Los Angeles Lakers star and activist Earvin "Magic" Johnson in 1991.

An $80 million renovation of the park was completed in 2020, adding improvements like a 20,000-square-foot (1,900 m^{2}) community events center, playgrounds for kids and 300 new trees. "There are new jogging paths, drought-tolerant native-plant gardens studded with sagebrush and sycamores, scenic overlooks” and a community center designed by Paul Murdoch Architects with interior murals by Carla Jay Harris.

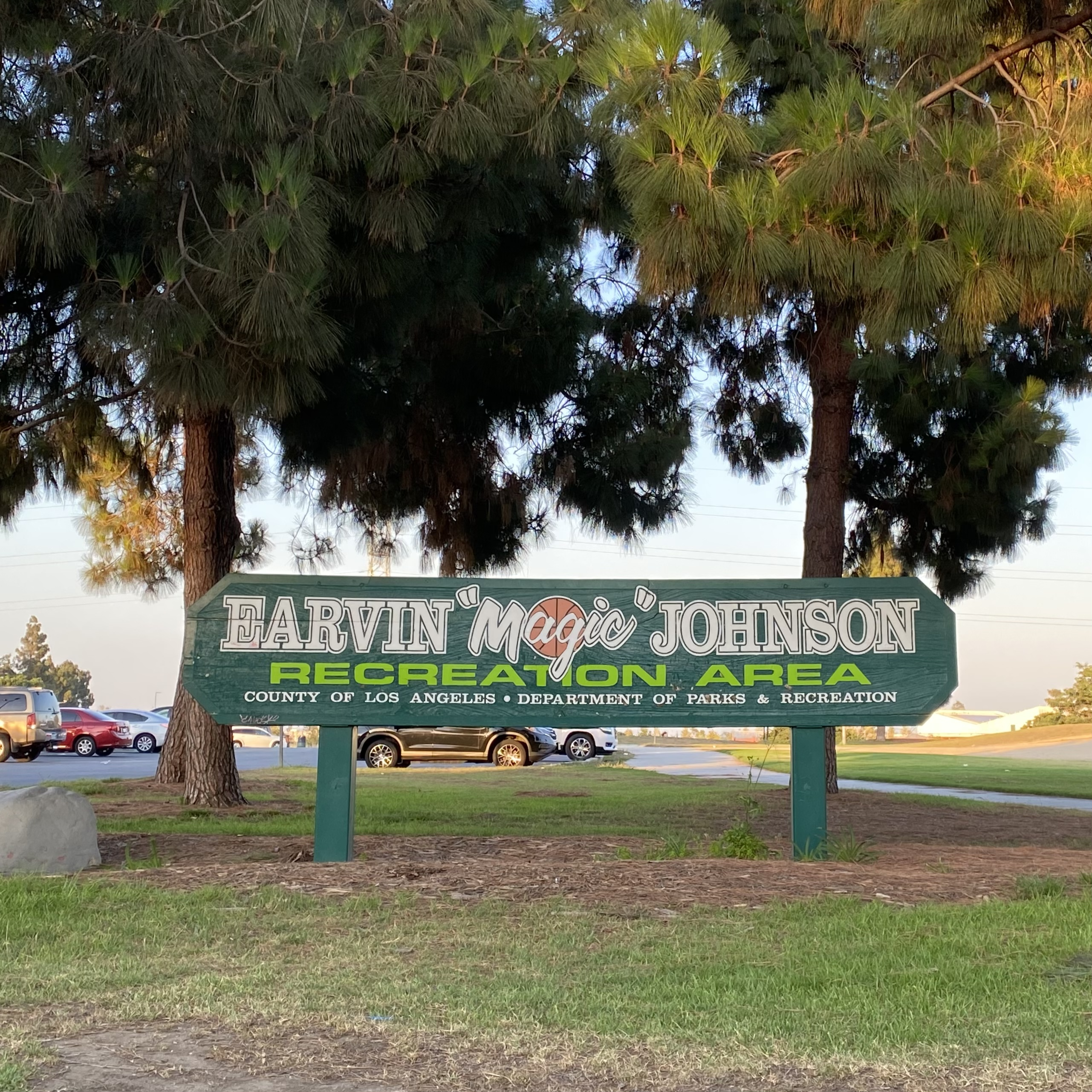
Earvin Magic Johnson Recreation Area

The park also captures and filters runoff water from a storm drain under El Segundo Blvd., diverting it from Compton Creek, and releases it into wetlands and lakes at the park for further bioremediation. The park has two lakes that attract waterfowl like mallards, wigeons and Muscovy ducks. Formerly the site included an ExxonMobil Oil storage and distribution site that polluted the ground beneath it and the Ujima Village public housing project.
