= Death of Edith Rodriguez =

Edith Isabel Rodriguez (February 1, 1964 – May 9, 2007) was a woman who died of gastrointestinal perforation at the Martin Luther King Jr.-Harbor Hospital (King-Harbor) in unincorporated Los Angeles County, California, United States, after being refused treatment by hospital staff. Staff believed that her pain was due to a gallstone attack and thus did not believe she required urgent medical care. Rodriguez's situation became a cause célèbre about the failures and bureaucratic indifference of both King-Harbor as well as political and health leaders in the Los Angeles area, creating or reinforcing fears that the health care system will not take care of people in a time of dire need. The Rodriguez case resulted in press coverage on national news networks such as CNN and CBS News.

== Incident at the hospital ==
On May 9, 2007, Rodriguez is reported to have lain on the floor of the hospital's emergency department waiting room for 45 minutes while boyfriend Jose Prado made calls to 911 to report that Rodriguez was dying but hospital staff could not be convinced to treat her. According to waiting room video, and a June 15, 2007 report by the U.S. Centers for Medicare and Medicaid Services, for at least 30 minutes "staff members walked past the patient or worked to clean the floor next to her without interacting with her"; at one point a janitor cleaned the floor around Rodriguez as she vomited blood. A bystander made a similar call, telling the 911 dispatcher that a woman vomiting blood was being ignored by emergency-room staff.

The caller requested an ambulance to transport the woman to another hospital, but her request was refused; emergency dispatchers would not act on the situation, nor call paramedic services, citing that the victim was at a hospital. The nighttime triage nurse, Linda Ruttlen, after repeatedly refusing to intervene, complained to police officers of the Los Angeles County Office of Public Safety that Rodriguez was causing a disturbance; a computer search on Rodriguez found that she had a parole violation for possession of a controlled substance. As county police were taking her into custody, Rodriguez became unresponsive and died on a stretcher. Results of toxicology testing by the coroner showed that Rodriguez tested positive for methamphetamine, but the level was not "life-threatening".

== Aftermath ==
As a result of the incident, six staff members at King-Harbor, including a nurse and two nursing assistants, received "letters of expectation" (a letter outlining how they should behave in the future and carrying no additional penalty) from the Los Angeles County Department of Health Services (DHS), taking into consideration previous performance history and their role in the event. In addition, the contract janitor was counseled verbally and the triage nurse (Linda Ruttlen) was placed on leave and later resigned. DHS placed most of the blame on Ruttlen, who pointedly refused requests to intervene, and she was referred to the state nursing board for investigation.

The incident, including the actions of 911 operators, was under review by the Los Angeles County Sheriff's Department. In response to public outcry, the chairman of the U.S. Senate Finance Committee, Sen. Max Baucus (D-Mont.) asked federal regulators to address how they will protect patients at King-Harbor in light of "horrific" and "appalling" lapses in patient care.

The police, who had arrested Rodriguez in hopes of getting her better medical treatment in jail than she had received at the hospital, were absolved of wrongdoing.

== See also ==
- Emergency Medical Treatment and Active Labor Act
