= Martin Luther King Jr. Outpatient Center =

Coordinates: 33.9238°N 118.2416°W

- Los Angeles County Department of Health Services

Geography
- Location: Willowbrook, California, United States

Organization
- Care system: Public
- Type: Community

History
- Founded: 1972; 54 years ago
- Closed: 2007

Links
- Website: dhs.lacounty.gov/wps/portal/dhs/mlk
- Lists: Hospitals in California

The Martin Luther King Jr. Outpatient Center, formerly known as Martin Luther King Jr. Multi-Service Ambulatory Care Center, Martin Luther King Jr./Drew Medical Center (King/Drew), and later Martin Luther King Jr.–Harbor Hospital (MLK–Harbor or King–Harbor), was a public urgent care center and outpatient clinic and former hospital in Willowbrook, an unincorporated section of Los Angeles County, California, north of the city of Compton and south of the Watts neighborhood of Los Angeles. It closed in 2007.

Founded as a major public hospital, it was shut down in August 2007 because of its poor record of patient care. The urgent care center and outpatient clinic, however, remained operating on the site. In 2014, a smaller hospital under a partnership between Los Angeles County and the University of California opened as a nonprofit organization governed by a seven-member board of directors.

MLK Outpatient Center was operated by the Los Angeles County Department of Health Services.

At the beginning of the 21st century and before its crisis, MLK–MACC (then MLK/Drew) had 537 beds, was the teaching hospital of the adjacent Charles R. Drew University of Medicine and Science, spread over a 38.5-acre (156,000 m^{2}) site, which included a dormitory for medical residents, employed 2,238 full-time personnel, and in 2004 treated 11,000 inpatients and 167,000 outpatients.

Located near high-crime streets, the hospital had a very active trauma unit. In 2003, it handled 2,150 gunshot wounds and other life-threatening injuries. Because of the large number of gunshot wounds the trauma unit saw, the United States Armed Forces sent their trauma teams to MLK/Drew for training.

After 2004, 260 of its staffers, including 41 doctors, had been fired or had resigned as a result of disciplinary proceedings. To alleviate the impact on the community of this large loss of capacity, the Los Angeles County Medical Alert Center contracted ambulances to take approximately 250 patients per month to other local hospitals.

In the 2000s, widely publicized problems related to incompetence and mismanagement caused the hospital to undergo a radical overhaul, which reduced the number of beds from 233 to 42 before it finally closed in 2007. It was replaced by the Martin Luther King Jr. Community Hospital.

== History ==
=== Founding and early history ===
The facility's founding was spurred by the 1965 Watts Riots. In the aftermath of the unrest, Governor Pat Brown appointed a commission to identify factors that contributed to the unrest. This result was the December 1965 McCone Report. One major finding of the report was the lack of healthcare access near the low-income neighborhoods of South Central Los Angeles. At the time, the closest major public trauma center was Los Angeles County-USC Medical Center, located over 10 miles (16 km) away—a problem heightened by the amount of gang violence in the area.

In 1966, DHS established a task force to develop a full-service community and teaching hospital operated by the County in conjunction with the USC and UCLA Medical Schools as well as the newly formed Charles R. Drew Postgraduate Medical School, a private nonprofit medical school formed to train doctors to work in areas of urban poverty.

Ground was broken on the hospital in April 1968. It was originally named the Los Angeles County Southeast General Hospital but was soon renamed Martin Luther King Jr. General Hospital, days after the namesake's assassination. After a dedication in February, it opened on March 27, 1972, as a full-service medical center. The facility changed its name again, to Martin Luther King Jr./Drew Medical Center, when it became the teaching hospital of the adjacent Charles R. Drew University of Medicine and Science.

In 1981, the hospital expanded into psychiatric care by opening the Augustus F. Hawkins Mental Health Center. In 1998, it expanded its trauma center. By the 1980s, King/Drew was part of the Drew/UCLA Undergraduate Medical Education Program, training physicians through a partnership of UCLA and Drew medical schools, and was a source of pride and jobs in the community.

=== The fall of King/Drew ===
King/Drew entered the 21st century with an array of problems related to incompetence and mismanagement. A perceived lack of quality at the hospital had earned it the nickname of "Killer King." The facility employed travel nurses from across the country in an attempt to improve conditions.

==== Troubles come to light ====
On August 22, 2003, the Los Angeles Times reported that two women connected to cardiac monitors at King/Drew died after their deteriorating vital signs went undetected. In December 2003, DHS closed the cardiac monitoring ward at the hospital after a third patient died under questionable circumstances. A consulting group was hired to help fix issues with the nursing staff; DHS spent nearly $1 million on this effort.

In a January 13, 2004, report, the federal Centers for Medicare and Medicaid Services determined that King/Drew was out of compliance with minimum requirements for receiving federal funding, citing the work of government inspectors who identified three patients who died at King/Drew after what were determined to have been grave errors by staff members. By March, CMS declared King/Drew patients were in "immediate jeopardy" of harm or death because of medication errors at the hospital, citing numerous mistakes and threatening to pull federal government funding from the public hospital.

In June, 2004 CMS again stated that patients were in jeopardy, citing the use of Taser stun guns to subdue psychiatric patients. Yet again, it threatened to pull federal funding but backed away; federal funding made up over half of King/Drew's $400 million operating budget.

==== Closure of the trauma center ====
On September 13, 2004, DHS recommended the closure of King/Drew's busy trauma unit, saying the hospital needed to put its full energy into fixing problems in other areas. Soon after, the Los Angeles Times revealed that the American College of Surgeons had revoked its approval of the quality of King/Drew's trauma unit in 1999 and 2003 because it failed to properly investigate questionable patient deaths, and that doctors routinely skipped meetings held to discuss treatment problems. Also in September, the Los Angeles County Board of Supervisors agreed with CMS to hire a new consulting firm to take over operations at the hospital.

By November 2004, neighborhood resistance to the proposed closures (particularly the trauma center) formed, led by U.S. Representative Maxine Waters and joined by the Rev. Jesse Jackson, Los Angeles Mayor James K. Hahn, actress Angela Bassett, and children of the Rev. Dr. Martin Luther King, Jr. In December 2004, CMS declared King/Drew patients were in "immediate jeopardy" for a third time. This time it cited the staff's heavy reliance on Los Angeles County Police personnel to deploy Tasers to subdue combative and violent psychiatric patients. Federal funds were again threatened, but as in previous times, action was not taken.

Despite protests, negative media and the near-unanimous opposition of city political leaders, the five-member Board of Supervisors voted four to zero, with one abstention, to move forward with closure of the trauma center. A temporary restraining order was filed by a group of doctors and residents, but was denied. The trauma unit was closed in early 2005. Patients were diverted to three other hospitals, both public and private (with county subsidy).

A few days later, the Joint Commission on Accreditation of Healthcare Organizations (now simply the Joint Commission), citing the medical center for failing to correct severe lapses in patient care, threatened to pull its seal of approval, jeopardizing over $14 million in physician training funds. King/Drew's seal of approval was revoked in February 2005.

This move gained national attention after the Los Angeles Times ran a Pulitzer Prize–winning five-part series reporting on "The Troubles at King/Drew." The series found that the problems at the hospital were far deeper than the public already knew and faulted the Board of Supervisors for shying away from making needed changes, often because of racial politics. Among the other findings was that King/Drew spent more per patient than any of the three other general hospitals run by Los Angeles County, the opposite of what many hospital supporters had assumed.

Problems for King/Drew became even worse over a period of four days in March 2005, when three patients died as a result of mistakes and lapses in medical care. The Board of Supervisors considered severing the hospital's relationship with Charles R. Drew University of Medicine and Science and partnering with another medical school such as UCLA, USC, or Loma Linda University.

In April, the Los Angeles Times reported a seventh death attributed to lapses in care by the hospital. This time, nurses and staff virtually ignored the audio and visual cues of vital-sign monitors over a period of hours.

==== "Make-or-break" inspection ====
After the three previous warnings holding King/Drew out of compliance with federal guidelines since January 2004, CMS and federal authorities held an unannounced last-chance inspection of the hospital that began on July 31, 2006, and was finished on August 10. On September 22, CMS informed King/Drew that the hospital still did not meet minimum patient-care standards, failing nine of the government's 23 conditions for federal funding, and thus failing the final "make-or-break" inspection. Federal regulators identified problems in nursing, pharmacy, infection control, surgical services, rehabilitation services, quality control, patients' rights, and the hospital's governing body and physical plant. Inspectors found more problems during the final inspection than they had at any time in the previous three years.

=== King/Drew becomes King–Harbor ===
==== Radical restructuring ====
DHS elected to move forward with a radical restructuring plan that eliminated the hospital's specialty services, severed its relationship with the Drew medical school, and proposed to place it under the management of Harbor–UCLA Medical Center (Harbor–UCLA). The plan downsized and refocused the hospital on community medical care, including emergency department and outpatient services; the two central pillars of the plan were identifying and removing under-performing staff and integrating the two hospitals "under one medical management and administrative leadership team at Harbor–UCLA." King/Drew became King–Harbor to reflect the change.

All employees of the hospital were interviewed, with half permitted to stay and the rest transferred to other hospitals. Approximately 1,400 employees remained. As a result of these measures, Medicare agreed to continue funding the hospital until March 31, 2007. After further negotiations, federal inspectors agreed to delay inspection until August 2007. King/Harbor had to pass this inspection. Otherwise federal funding would end on November 30, 2007. As a part of the March deal with the federal government, Los Angeles County agreed not to bill Medicare for hospital services until August 2007, giving it time to fix problems at the hospital. If federal funding ended, among other problems, MLK–Harbor would permanently lose 250 medical resident slots, 15% of the 1,700 in Los Angeles County.

On March 6, 2007, officials from Charles R. Drew University of Medicine and Science announced they were suing Los Angeles County for $125 million for breach of contract, claiming that the restructuring of the hospital terminated support to 248 medical residents and gutted the adjacent university. The two entities had collaborated since 1972. In response, Los Angeles County Board Supervisor Mike Antonovich stated "Drew University will fail in court as they failed as a medical school."

==== Problems surface again ====
Despite initially upbeat official reports from hospital officials, King–Harbor found itself under public criticism once again after different stories ran in both the Los Angeles Times and LA Weekly in late May 2007 citing serious lapses in care, one of which was fatal, at the renamed hospital. In particular, the case of patient Edith Isabel Rodriguez, who bled to death on the emergency room floor after being ignored for 45 minutes, became a cause célèbre of the failures and bureaucratic indifference of King–Harbor as well as political and health leaders in Los Angeles, creating or reinforcing fears that the healthcare system could not take care of people in a time of dire need. In response to public outcry, the chairman of the U.S. Senate Finance Committee, Senator Max Baucus (D-Mont.) asked federal regulators to address how they will protect patients at King–Harbor in light of "horrific" and "appalling" lapses in patient care.

The news reports prompted a multi-day inspection by state and federal officials, and on June 7, 2007, federal health officials declared that King–Harbor had put emergency department patients in "immediate jeopardy" of harm or death, that it remained in violation of the Emergency Medical Treatment and Active Labor Act, and gave it 23 days to fix the problems or lose federal funding once and for all. During the inspection, CMS found that 17 patients, among 60 whose cases were reviewed, received substandard care at the hospital. If the problems were resolved in that timeline, the hospital still could have lost its federal certification because it had failed to meet the terms of a March agreement with the U.S. Centers for Medicare and Medicaid Services. Despite multiple threats from the government, experts in hospital accreditation attribute the federal government's relatively tempered response to the hospital's unique history and special standing in the community, as well as its support from African American politicians.

On June 12, 2007, the Los Angeles Times reported that King–Harbor had replaced its chief medical officer, Dr. Roger Peeks, who had been brought in to fix problems three years earlier. During a June 18, 2007, meeting with the County Board of Supervisors, county health officials disclosed that they were still unable to meet the cornerstone pledges they had made to CMS: only about one-third of the 1,200 employees they initially projected would be shifted to other institutions had actually been reassigned, and significant control had not been effectively handed off to Harbor–UCLA. In April, 60% of 285 registered and licensed vocational nurses failed one or more parts of basic clinical competency assessments; while more than 10% failed three or more sections of the assessment. The staff of Harbor–UCLA was surprised by the amount of training King–Harbor employees needed.

On June 21, 2007, the state California Department of Health Services moved to revoke the license of King–Harbor. The process, supported by state politicians, including Gov. Schwarzenegger, could take six months to a year and would force the hospital's closure. CDHS could rescind the action if the hospital was able to show that it met state and federal standards. There remained serious concerns over how King–Harbor's 47,000 annual emergency department visits might be spread across the system with minimum disruption if the hospital were to close.

In response to the state's decision, Los Angeles County supervisors considered having the county close the hospital ahead of the state, hoping to thereby formulate and implement an orderly plan for diverting patients and, by suspending King–Harbor instead of allowing it to lose its state license, making an easier task reopening it. The County ultimately decided to not move for closure. The hospital received a brief reprieve when a June 25, 2007, inspection showed critical problems with its emergency department identified earlier in the month had been corrected, preserving federal certification and funding for the hospital until August 2007, when it must pass a broader federal review.

The weeklong federal inspection began on July 23, 2007. The next day, inspectors from CMS once again cited King–Harbor for placing patients in "immediate jeopardy" of harm, hours after a psychiatric patient cut herself with a scalpel in an emergency department bathroom.

==== Closure ====
On August 10, 2007, after the hospital failed a comprehensive review by the U.S. Centers for Medicare and Medicaid Services, federal officials decided to revoke $200 million in funding. Inspectors concluded that there was no functioning quality improvement plan at the hospital. Los Angeles County health director Dr. Bruce Chernof moved quickly to notify the county Board of Supervisors of his decision to begin shutting down the facility. The emergency department was closed by 7 p.m. that day, and ambulances were diverted to other area hospitals. The rest of the hospital was closed by August 27, 2007. Some of King–Harbor's 1,600 employees would likely be reassigned to jobs at other county facilities.

On August 13, at a specially convened board meeting, county supervisors voted unanimously to shut inpatient services and promised to pay up to $16.3 million to nearby private hospitals and doctors bracing for a deluge of patients from the closed facility. They also released the 124-page report by federal inspectors that detailed dozens of errors and failures by the hospital during their final make-or-break review. The citations included improperly sterilized medical equipment, nurses who could not rapidly find medication, a nurse who did not know how to mix medication in an emergency, and a patient who complained of severe chest pain but was not given pain medication for four and a half hours.

With the hospital closed, the facility continued to operate as the Martin Luther King Jr. Multi-Service Ambulatory Care Center, an urgent care facility and outpatient clinic.

==== Ramifications of closure ====
The closure of King–Harbor had an immediate effect on health care services in the region. Nine nearby hospitals were declared "impacted" by the distribution of former King–Harbor patients. The greatest burden fell on St. Francis Medical Center in nearby Lynwood, which expanded its emergency department by 14 beds and saw an increase in patients from 155 per day to 180 per day, with the intensive care unit seeing an average rise from 26 patients to 33. Nearby clinics were also impacted. The nine clinics that were part of the St. John's Well Child and Family Centers saw a 157 per cent increase in visits after King–Harbor closed. Meanwhile, the remaining outpatient clinic at King–Harbor saw patient totals fall well below the target of 190,000 visits a year, due to the poor reputation of the facility. As King–Harbor was long a major hospital for the city's sickest and poorest residents, the increase in uninsured and under-insured patients put major stress on the financial health of relieving institutions. With the closure of the hospital, South Los Angeles had one hospital bed per 1,000 residents, compared with a national average of three beds per 1,000 residents.

== Replacement hospital ==
As soon as MLK–Harbor was closed, efforts were begun to find a way to reopen the facility as soon as possible. Los Angeles County officials originally planned a 2009 reopening, but that proved unfeasible. The County found a partnership with the University of California system to reopen the hospital as a nonprofit organization governed by a seven-member board of directors; the hospital would no longer be run by the county. The board of directors would consist of two appointees chosen by the university system, two chosen by county officials, and three chosen jointly. The county was to contribute $50 million annually to cover expenses and operating costs and $13.3 million a year toward the care of uninsured patients. The county would continue to staff and operate the hospital's outpatient services center, which has remained open. The hospital, named Martin Luther King, Jr. Community Hospital opened on 7 July 2015.

The new nonprofit entity handles all hiring for the Martin Luther King Jr. Community Hospital. This had been a major point of negotiation because the hospital staff had gained a reputation for being packed with people politically connected to various elected officials, leading to criticism that problems with hospital staff tended to be ignored. At the time of its closure, MLK–Harbor had about 11.5 workers per bed, compared with the statewide average of four workers per bed. Civil service rules and labor contracts would have required former MLK–Harbor employees to be given first chance at a replacement hospital if it were directly owned and operated by Los Angeles County. Chartering the replacement hospital under a Section 501(c)(3) nonprofit organization made it a distinct entity from the county, unencumbered by legacy hiring rules.

The replacement community hospital opened as a smaller facility, with 131 beds instead of 233 (compared to 537 at its height). It has an emergency department and four operating rooms. The UC system provides fourteen to twenty physicians and medical oversight for the inpatient hospital, with a goal of eventually providing medical residents to again train there. Other improvements are an upgraded central plant, new emergency generators, and two new buildings, one with six out-patient surgeries and a dental clinic, with an estimated total cost of more than $350 million.

== Affiliated high school ==
King Drew Magnet High School of Medicine and Science, is located adjacent to the hospital in Willowbrook. It is a Los Angeles Unified School District magnet school affiliated with the MLK Jr. hospital

== See also ==
- Martin Luther King Jr. Community Hospital – opened on site in 2015.
- Charles R. Drew University of Medicine and Science – adjacent.
- King Drew Magnet High School of Medicine and Science – adjacent.
- History of the African-Americans in Los Angeles
- South Los Angeles-related topics

== Notes ==
=== References ===
- Charles Ornstein et al., King/Drew Fallout Is Keenly Felt, Los Angeles Times, September 26, 2006, Accessed Sept. 26, 2006.
- Tracy Weber and Deborah Schoch, Hospital Backers Concede Choices Tough, Los Angeles Times, September 24, 2006, Accessed Sept. 26, 2006.
- Charles Ornstein and Tracy Weber, King/Drew Fails Final U.S. Test, Los Angeles Times, September 23, 2006, Accessed Sept. 26, 2006.
- Kevin Roderick, Killer King on KCRW, LA Observed, August 17, 2005, Accessed Sept. 26, 2006.
- Tracy Weber and Charles Ornstein, Another Fatal Failure at King/Drew, Los Angeles Times, April 12, 2005, Accessed Sept. 26, 2006.
- Charles Ornstein and Tracy Weber, 3 King/Drew Deaths Blamed on Lapses, Los Angeles Times, April 6, 2005, Accessed Sept. 26, 2006.
- Tracy Weber et al., The Troubles at King/Drew (5-part series), Los Angeles Times, December 2004, Accessed Sept. 26, 2006.
- Jia-Rui Chong, Judge Denies Bid to Halt Trauma Unit's Closure, Los Angeles Times, December 3, 2004, Accessed Sept. 26, 2006.
- Kevin Roderick, Blame for Killer King, LA Observed, December 9, 2004, Accessed Sept. 26, 2006.
- Bill Boyarsky, USC, practical politics and King hospital, LA Observed, May 4, 2008, Accessed July 9, 2008.
- Mitchell Landsberg and Jack Leonard, King/Drew's Trauma Unit Ordered Shut, Los Angeles Times, November 24, 2004, Accessed Sept. 26, 2006.
- Jack Leonard, Closure of King/Drew Unit Likely, Los Angeles Times, November 22, 2004, Accessed Sept. 26, 2006.
- Jia-Rui Chong et al., Waters at Center Stage in King/Drew Drama, Los Angeles Times, November 17, 2004, Accessed Sept. 26, 2006.
- Mitchell Landsberg et al., Reaction to King/Drew Plan Loud and Clear, Los Angeles Times, November 16, 2004, Accessed Sept. 26, 2006.
- Charles Ornstein et al., A Reeling King/Drew Receives Huge Blow, Los Angeles Times, September 16, 2004, Accessed Sept. 26, 2006.
- Tracy Weber and Charles Ornstein, King/Drew to Shut Down Trauma Unit, Los Angeles Times, September 13, 2004, Accessed Sept. 26, 2006.
- Charles Ornstein and Tracy Weber, Report Assails Hospital Lapses, Los Angeles Times, January 30, 2004, Accessed Sept. 26, 2006.
- Garrett Therolf, More King–Harbor hospital workers have criminal backgrounds, Los Angeles Times, September 9, 2008.
- Araceli Gonzalez Deputy Director, Community Liaison, Los Angeles Office of Governor Arnold Schwarzenegger.
