= Western Association of Schools and Colleges - Senior College and University Commission =

Institutional accreditor in the United States

- Abbreviation: WSCUC
- Predecessor: Western Association of Schools and Colleges
- Formation: 1962 (as WASC); 2012 (as WSCUC)
- Purpose: Higher education accreditation
- Headquarters: Alameda, California
- Region served: United States and selected international locations
- President: Maria Toyoda
- Affiliations: Council for Higher Education Accreditation
- Website: www.wscuc.org

The Western Association of Schools and Colleges - Senior College and University Commission (WSCUC) is an institutional accreditor in the United States. It is recognized by the United States Department of Education and the Council for Higher Education Accreditation (CHEA).

== History ==
The Western Association of Schools and Colleges (WASC) was established in 1962 to coordinate accreditation in the western United States. It grew out of the earlier Western College Association, itself descended from the Southern California Conference of Colleges and Universities founded in 1924.

In 2012–2013, WASC reorganized. Its three commissions — the Accrediting Commission for Senior Colleges and Universities, the Accrediting Commission for Community and Junior Colleges (ACCJC), and the Accrediting Commission for Schools (ACS) — reincorporated as separate 501(c)(3) organizations with independent governance. The WASC Senior College and University Commission (WSCUC) became the accreditor of degree-granting senior colleges and universities.

== Region Served ==
WSCUC accredits institutions in California, Hawaii, and other western U.S. states, as well as selected institutions across the United States and internationally.

== Criteria For Accreditation ==
WSCUC institutions are evaluated under four broad Standards of Accreditation, each with detailed Criteria for Review (CFRs). The standards are:

1. Defining institutional purposes and ensuring educational objectives
2. Achieving educational objectives through core functions
3. Developing and applying resources and organizational structures to ensure quality and sustainability
4. Creating an organization committed to quality assurance, institutional learning, and improvement

In 2023, WSCUC adopted revised Standards in a new Handbook of Accreditation, maintaining the four-standard framework while updating content and reaffirmation procedures.

== Programs and Initiatives ==
WSCUC accreditation emphasizes institutional capacity, student learning, financial sustainability, and continuous improvement. It uses peer review and periodic reaffirmation of accreditation to ensure quality.

== See also ==
- Higher education accreditation in the United States
- Council for Higher Education Accreditation
- United States Department of Education
