= King/Drew Magnet High School of Medicine and Science =

Location
- 1601 East 120th Street Los Angeles, California 90059; 33.924359°N 118.245724°W

Information
- Type: Magnet
- Established: 1982
- Principal: Reginald Brookens
- Staff: 68.48 (FTE)
- Enrollment: 1,359 (2023-2024)
- Student to teacher ratio: 19.85
- Colors: Black, white, and gold
- Team name: The Golden Eagles
- Website: kingdrew.net

King/Drew Magnet High School of Medicine and Science is a magnet high school of the Los Angeles Unified School District, located in Willowbrook, unincorporated Los Angeles County, California, United States.

It is affiliated with both the Martin Luther King Jr. Community Hospital and the Charles R. Drew University of Medicine and Science.

== History ==
The school opened in bungalows across the street from the Martin Luther King Jr./Drew Medical Center and adjacent to the Charles R. Drew University of Medicine and Science in 1982. In 1999 it moved to a standalone campus adjacent to the original bungalows. It was the dream of the principal during the mid 90s, Dr. Ernie Roy, to move from the bungalows, into a bigger school, that was more representative of Dr. Martin Luther King Jr. and Dr. Charles R. Drew. Dr. Ernie Roy was also a key player in the founding of King/Drew Medical Magnet High School.

In 2005, J. Michelle Woods, the principal, stated that problems at the King/Drew hospital caused damage to the perception of the high school. According to Mitchell Landsberg of the Los Angeles Times, the administrators and students at the school stated that the problems at the university and medical center did not affect them.

On September 14, 2007, Hillary Clinton made an appearance at King/Drew Magnet High School.

In 2008 and 2009 U.S. News & World Report ranked King/Drew Magnet High School as a silver medal winner amongst America's best high schools.

In 2017 the school was named a California Gold Ribbon School.

== King Drew walkout ==
On April 25, 2023, a man was allegedly found dead near the school. Staff members at King Drew were informed by LAPD on the alleged death. The LAUSD high school would do nothing to address the situation or even explain what had happened. Many students felt that school safety and communication was at its lowest due to how the school responded to the situation. Principal Reginald Brookens stated there was a code to follow, but many had felt unsafe due to the danger of a school shooter being loose. After many days students rallied on the social media platform Instagram, and announced a walkout to honor the man's death, but also to give voice to safety issues at the school. The walkout was held May 9, with many staff members in attendance and the LAPD on site. The walkout was short lived but later moved to the school's lecture hall where students voiced concerns on school safety and the leadership of the principal and administration.

== Academics ==
The school requires all students to adhere to the course loads, including four years of mathematics, two years of a foreign language, and two years of science, required by the University of California, Los Angeles and California State University, Los Angeles. In 2015, seventy-two percent of King/Drew's tested students met or exceeded the Smarter Balanced standards in English language arts.

== Demographics ==
As of 2005 the school had slightly fewer than 1,700 students. As of that year, the school had twice the number of female students as it does male students. Administrators at King/Drew stated that because the school does not offer American football, more girls than boys apply to the school.

== Student performance ==
In 2005, Richard "Richie" Black, the assistant vice chancellor for admissions and enrollment of the University of California, Berkeley (UC Berkeley), stated that of all high schools, King/Drew had the second highest combined number of Black and Latino/Chicano students accepted by his school. As of 2005, the school, out of all high schools in the United States, habitually has the highest number of black students going to the University of California, Los Angeles (UCLA). As of that year, five University of California campuses, including UCLA, accepted students at King/Drew. In addition, Cornell University, Duke University, Harvard University, Princeton University, Columbia University, Case Western Reserve University and Stanford University accepted King/Drew students. In 2005, there were 20 King/Drew students accepted to UCLA. Twelve of them were Latino and eight were Black.

== Notable alumni ==
- Issa Rae (born 1985), actress (Barbie, Insecure)
- Max Iheanachor, NFL football player for the Pittsburgh Steelers

== Sports ==
- Basketball
- Soccer
- Volleyball
- Baseball
- Softball
- Cross country
- Football
- Track and field
- Tennis
- Golf
- Sideline Cheer
- Competitive Cheer

The school is also home to the Drew League, a pro-am basketball league.
