= Deborah Prothrow-Stith =

American physician and academic

Deborah Prothrow-Stith (born February 6, 1954) is an American physician, educator, and public health leader. She currently serves as the Dean and Professor at the Charles R. Drew University College of Medicine in Los Angeles. She is widely recognized for redefining youth violence as a public health issue, a perspective that has shaped national approaches to prevention and community health.

== Early life ==
Prothrow-Stith was born on February 6, 1954, in Marshall, Texas, to Percy and Mildred Prothrow, and was raised in Atlanta, Georgia. She graduated from Jack Yates Senior High School and earned a bachelor's degree in mathematics from Spelman College in 1975. She received her M.D. from Harvard Medical School in 1979.

== Career ==
Prothrow-Stith started her medical career in Boston, working in emergency medicine and serving adolescents in community clinics. Seeing so many young people hurt by violence made her want to focus on stopping it before it happens, rather than just treating the injuries. This realization motivated her into public health and prevention work.

Prothrow-Stith was an influential advocate for educational reform in medical school settings throughout her professional academic life. She has been at the forefront of expanding the availability of medical education opportunities to underrepresented populations and advocating for the inclusion of curricula in medical schools that address the impact of social determinants of health contribute to health disparities among individuals before they arrive at the hospital. She has played an active role in designing community based educational programs where medical students are able to participate in learning about the communities in which they provide care. As a result, she has enhanced relationships between university systems and community organizations that have contributed to changes in how many medical schools in the U.S. currently view their roles in addressing public health.

She served as the Henry Pickering Walcott Professor of Public Health Practice and Associate Dean for Diversity at the Harvard School of Public Health, where she helped to establish the Division of Public Health Practice and was involved in securing grant funding for public health programs. After serving in state public health leadership, she later worked as a principal consultant advising healthcare orgado ynizations on leadership and talent at the firm Spencer Stuart.In 1987, Governor Michael Dukakis appointed her Commissioner of Public Health for the Commonwealth of Massachusetts; in that role she oversaw statewide public health programs and helped create the state's Office of Violence Prevention. Prothrow-Stith became the first woman, first African-American woman and youngest person to serve as the Commissioner of Public Health for the state.

She and her family lived in Tanzania while her husband, Charles R. Stith, served as U.S. Ambassador to Tanzania from 1998 to 2001. Prothrow-Stith was elected to the National Academy of Medicine in 2003. In 2017 she was honored as Woman of the Year for the Second District by the Los Angeles County Board of Supervisors.

In 2025, she attended the 2025 Celebration of women in Medicine and Science hosted by the UC Riverside school of Medicine. This event held every September, encourages medical institutions to spotlight the accomplishment of women in Science and Medicine. Deborah was a key panelist who spoke on her experiences as a Healthcare provider and led to her working in public health and against violence.

=== Public health and violence prevention ===
While working in Boston, Prothrow-Stith was one of the first to treat youth violence like a public health problem, focusing on teaching, prevention, and helping communities stay safe.

Prothrow-Stith also shifted the national conversation regarding violence prevention policy issues. Through her support of data-driven approaches to violence prevention, she advocated for the collection of specific community level data concerning injury patterns among youth, family environments, and neighborhood resources in order to inform effective responses to violence. Her advocacy and research have promoted the investment of cities in programs such as mentoring, after school programs and conflict resolution training as core health intervention strategies. The evidence-based nature of her approach to public health has resulted in informed decisions regarding funding priorities within schools, local health departments and federal agencies since the 1990s and early 2000s, and is still influencing public health initiatives today.

She developed the Violence Prevention Curriculum for Adolescents, a classroom curriculum first published in the late 1980s and field-tested in multiple sites. Her curriculum and publications helped establish school-based violence prevention as an area of practice and research.

In 1995, she was chosen by the President to serve on the National Commission on Crime Control and Prevention. In 2025 she participated as a speaker in the Celebration of Women in Medicine and Science at the University of California, Riverside.

== Personal life ==
Prothrow-Stith keeps her personal life largely private. Publicly. known information is Prothrow-Stith is married to Charles R. Stith, a Boston University professor and former U.S. Ambassador to Tanzania. The couple lived in Tanzania while he served as U.S. Ambassador from 1998 to 2001. They have a family together and reside in the United States.

== Selected publications ==
- Spivak, H.; Prothrow-Stith, D. (2001). "The Need to Address Bullying—An Important Component of Violence Prevention". JAMA. 285 (16): 2131–2. doi:10.1001/jama.285.16.2131. ISSN 0098-7484. PMID 11311105.
- Prothrow-Stith, D.B. (1995). "The Epidemic of Youth Violence in America: Using Public Health Prevention Strategies to Prevent Violence". Journal of Health Care for the Poor and Underserved. 6 (2): 95–101. doi:10.1353/hpu.2010.0659. ISSN 1548-6869. PMID 7795043. S2CID 24355794.
- Hausman, A.J.; Spivak, H.; Prothrow-Stith, D. (1995). "Evaluation of a community-based youth violence prevention project". Journal of Adolescent Health. 17 (6): 353–359. doi:10.1016/1054-139X(95)00172-O. ISSN 1054-139X. PMID 8924441.
- Hausman, A; Spivak, H; Prothrowstith, D; Roeber, J (1992). "Patterns of teen exposure to a community-based violence prevention project1". Journal of Adolescent Health. 13 (8): 668–675. doi:10.1016/1054-139X(92)90061-F. ISSN 1054-139X. PMID 1290766.
- Prothrow-Stith, D. (2016). "Strengthening the Collaboration between Public Health and Criminal Justice to Prevent Violence". The Journal of Law, Medicine & Ethics. 32 (1): 82–88. doi:10.1111/j.1748-720X.2004.tb00451.x. ISSN 1073-1105. PMID 15152429. S2CID 11995691.
- Prothrow-Stith, D., et al. (1987). "The Violence Prevention Project: A Public Health Approach." Science, Technology, & Human Values, vol. 12, no. 3/4, pp. 67–69. JSTOR
- Hertz, M.F.; Prothrow-Stith, D.; Chery, C. (2005). "Homicide Survivors". American Journal of Preventive Medicine. 29 (5): 288–295. doi:10.1016/j.amepre.2005.08.027. ISSN 0749-3797. PMID 16376732.
- Prothrow-Stith, D. (2005). Sugar and spice and no longer nice: How we can stop girls' violence. John Wiley & Sons. ISBN 9780787975715.
- Prothrow-Stith, D., Spivak, H.R. (2004) "Murder is no accident: Understanding and preventing youth violence in America." Jossey-Bass.
- Prothrow-Stith, D., Weissman, M. (1991) "Deadly consequences: How Violence Is Destroying Our Teenage Population and a Plan to Begin Solving the Problem." HarperCollins New York.

== Awards ==
- Secretary of Health and Human Services Exceptional Achievement in Public Service Award (1989, Louis W. Sullivan)
- American Psychiatric Association's Solomon Carter Fuller Award (1998)
- World Health Day Award (1993)
- 10 honorary doctorates
- 1995 National Commission on Crime Control and Prevention
