= L.A. Care Health Plan =

Public agency in Los Angeles, California

Local Initiative Health Authority for Los Angeles County L.A. Care Health Plan
- official logo

Agency overview
- Formed: April 1, 1997
- Type: Local public authority
- Jurisdiction: Los Angeles County
- Headquarters: 1200 W. 7th Street Los Angeles, CA 90017
- Annual budget: US$8.77B (2015)
- Agency executives: Martha Santana-Chin, Chief Executive Officer; Sameer Amin, M.D., Chief Medical Officer; Afzal Shah, Chief Financial Officer
- Website: lacare.org

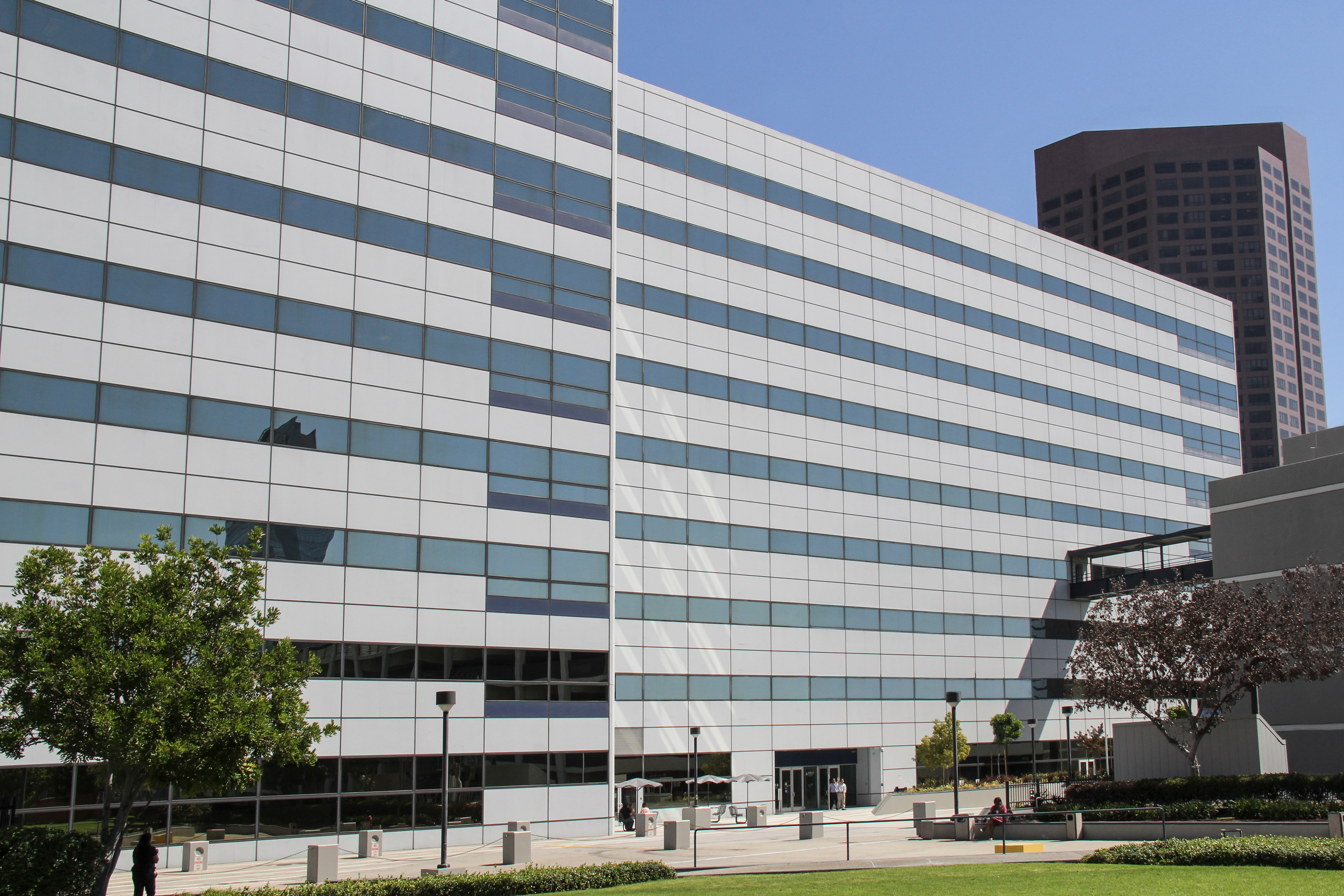
Headquarters in Los Angeles, California

The Local Initiative Health Authority for Los Angeles County (L.A. Care) is a public agency that provides health insurance to Los Angeles County residents, particularly those who are low-income or uninsured, through four health coverage programs including Medi-Cal. It is one of the few plans in California that provide a public health insurance option.

== History and structure ==
L.A. Care Health Plan (Local Initiative Health Authority for Los Angeles County) was created in 1997 by the State of California to provide health care services for Medi-Cal managed care beneficiaries, uninsured children and other vulnerable populations in Los Angeles County.

In 1993, the State Department of Health Services produced a report entitled "Expanding Medi-Cal Managed Care: Reforming the Health System – Protecting Vulnerable Populations" which served as a blueprint for expansion of Medi-Cal managed care. It designated L.A. County as one of the areas for the "Two-Plan Model" where a locally organized Medi-Cal managed care plan (local initiative health plan) would be formed to compete directly for Medi-Cal managed care enrollments with a "commercial plan". After a competitive selection process, Health Net of California was chosen by the State as the "commercial plan", L.A. Care Health Plan was formed as the Local Initiative Health Authority of Los Angeles County, and the Two-Plan Model began to operate in L.A. County.

During its 1997 launch, L.A. Care contracted with seven established health plans, referred to as plan partners: Blue Cross of California (now Anthem), Community Health Plan (CHP), Kaiser Permanente, Care1st, UHP, Tower Health Plan and Maxicare. By 2006, L.A. Care had established its own direct line of business in Medi-Cal.

In 2008, L.A. Care launched the Medicare Advantage Special Needs Plan (SNP) for those dually-eligible for both Medi-Cal and Medicare. Starting in 2015, dually-eligible members were given the option to join the L.A. Care Cal MediConnect plan, offering members a coordinated care model within a single health plan and will help to foster better health outcomes and improved quality of life for dual-eligibles.

== Governance ==
L.A. Care is governed by a 13-member stakeholder Board of Governors representing consumers, community clinics, physicians, hospitals, federally-qualified health centers, children's health care providers, and the Los Angeles County Department of Health Services. Two of the seats are held by consumers who are elected by L.A. Care enrollees. L.A. Care is among the few public health plans to have consumer members on its governing board with full voting privileges.

Fifteen consumer advisory committees from across Los Angeles County advise the board of governors.

== Community grantmaking ==
L.A. Care launched its Community Health Investment Fund in 2001. Since then, it has awarded more than $132 million in grants and support for the health care safety net, to improve community and public health and expand health insurance coverage among underserved populations. Grant initiatives include the Tranquada Awards, which provide infrastructure support for safety net clinics, the Oral Health Initiative, which expands access to dental care for low-income Angelenos, and the Health Information Technology Initiative, which helps clinics purchase and implement technologies such as disease registries and electronic health records.

In 2017, L.A. Care announced a $20 million commitment to address homelessness in Los Angeles County. The five-year commitment is with Brilliant Corners, a nonprofit that works with the county's Housing for Health program.

== Community resource centers ==
Jointly operated by Blue Shield of California Promise Health Plan and L.A. Care Health Plan, community resource centers offer member support services, enrolment in local and state assistance programs and other community services. Centers are currently located in Pomona, Lynwood, East Los Angeles and Palmdale. The centers, to total 14, are part of a five-year, $146 million initiative launched by the two health plans in 2019 to expand community health access across Los Angeles County.

L.A. Care Health Plan previously operated Family Resource Centers. They were located in East L.A., Lynwood, Inglewood, Boyle Heights, Pacoima and Palmdale, California, providing free health education, fitness and nutrition classes to all community members.

== Programs ==
=== Promotion of health information technology ===
In April 2010, L.A. Care was awarded a federal grant to establish a Health Information Technology Regional Extension Center (REC), called HITEC-LA, to help doctors in L.A. County adopt and use Electronic Health Records (EHRs). HITEC-LA is the sole REC in L.A. County, under the terms of the grant. The grant was awarded by the U.S. Department of Health and Human Services through the Health Information Technology for Economic and Clinical Health Act (HITECH Act), of the American Recovery and Reinvestment Act of 2009.

=== 2018 initiative to address physician shortage ===
In July 2018, L.A. Care launched Elevating the Safety Net, a long-term initiative to recruit primary care physicians to the Los Angeles County safety net. The L.A. Care Board of Governors committed $31 million for the initiative, which has three programs: medical school scholarships, medical school loan repayments and a recruitment program to help clinics and practices with physician salary subsidies, sign-on bonuses and relocation costs.

In 2021, L.A. Care provided $3.2 million to Charles Drew University of Medicine and Science, White Memorial Medical Center Charitable Foundation, AltaMed Health ServicesCorporation, and the David Geffen School of Medicine at UCLA in support of 25 residency positions.

== Legal actions and compliance issues ==
In March 2022 L.A. Care was fined $55 million by the California Department of Managed Health Care and the California Department of Health Care Services for "deep-rooted, systemic failures that threaten the health and safety of its members." In March 2023, the Los Angeles Times reported that, according to hospitals in the region, the problems persisted and had reached a "crisis point". L.A. Care agreed to pay $1.3 million to settle patient privacy violations in September 2023.

== See also ==
- Health care
