= Willowbrook, California =

Unincorporated community in the United States

- Census-designated place
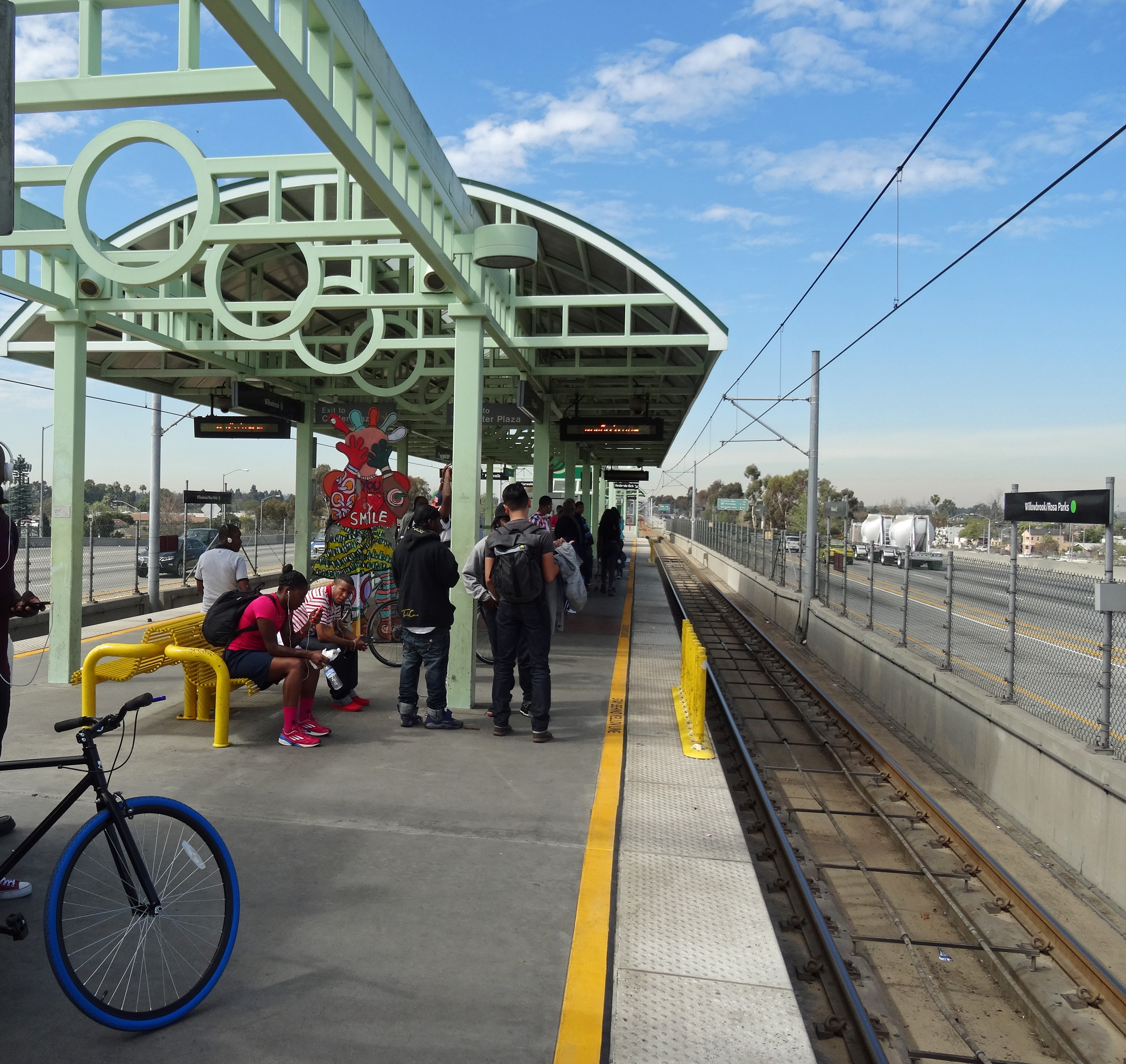
- Willowbrook train station
- Interactive map of Willowbrook, California
- Location of Willowbrook Willowbrook, California (southern California) Willowbrook, California (California) Willowbrook, California (the United States)
- Coordinates: 33°55′3″N 118°15′10″W
- Country: United States
- State: California
- County: Los Angeles

Area
  - Total: 1.679 sq mi (4.349 km^{2})
  - Land: 1.676 sq mi (4.342 km^{2})
  - Water: 0.0027 sq mi (0.007 km^{2}) 0.17%
- Elevation: 95 ft (29 m)

Population (2020)
  - Total: 24,295
  - Density: 14,490/sq mi (5,595/km^{2})
- Time zone: UTC−8 (PST)
  - Summer (DST): UTC−7 (PDT)
- ZIP Code: 90022, 90059 & 90061
- Area codes: 310/424, 323
- FIPS code: 06-85614
- GNIS feature ID: 1867074

Willowbrook, alternatively named Willow Brook, is an unincorporated community and census-designated place (CDP) in Los Angeles County, California, United States. The population was 24,295 at the 2020 census.

Willowbrook is the home to the newly renovated Martin Luther King Jr. Outpatient Center. Also located in Willowbrook is the Charles R. Drew University of Medicine and Science, which oversees residency training programs, allied health programs, a medical education program (jointly with the University of California, Los Angeles), a medical magnet high school, the area Head Start program, and various centers for health disparities research. Due to severe deficiencies, the former King/Drew Medical Center lost accreditation of several key residency training programs.

== History ==
Long before the name "Willowbrook" was given, willows and a slow, shallow brook separated this portion of the Los Angeles plain from the rest of it. The original rancho boundary of the 1840s was a lone, streamside willow tree along the present intersection of 125th Street and Mona Boulevard.

In the early days, springs were abundant in Willowbrook. Winter rains brought up fine ryegrass stands between gravelly ridges left by the long-ago floods of the Los Angeles River. Anastacio Avila was grazing cattle on the land as early as 1820. The Mexican governor had granted him 3,599 acres (14.56 km^{2}) acres by 1843. The grant was called Rancho La Tajauta, and it extended from the marshes along present Alameda Street westward to approximately the present line of the Harbor Freeway. Within the area covered by Rancho La Tajauta is all of present-day Willowbrook.

In 1894 and 1895, the first subdivisions in the Willowbrook area were registered along what is now Rosecrans Avenue. The name of Willowbrook was first formally used when Willowbrook Tract was recorded by the County Recorder in 1903. Next to the tract was the recently opened Pacific Electric Railway to Long Beach. There is no indication that a townsite had been envisioned and that street patterns were not synchronized. The Willowbrook name came into use for the entire area, because Pacific Electric Railroad Company's Big Red Cars stopped at Willowbrook's 126th Street. The first branch of the Los Angeles County Free Library was established in Willowbrook: "It was opened in April, 1913, in a private house, but has been located for several years since in the post office building."

In Willowbrook, lot purchasers expected to live a definitely suburban life. The deep lots, sometimes 300 feet or 91 meters in depth, attracted working-class families, especially newcomers to Southern California. The Big Red Cars offered fast and convenient transport to shops in downtown Los Angeles and jobs in port areas of Long Beach and San Pedro. During the Depression years, residents used the land behind their homes to cultivate fruits and vegetables, run hogs, and raise chickens. This use of land, along with the vacant lots filled with mustard plants, enhanced the rural appearance of the area. Increased suburban growth occurred in Willowbrook after the end of the Depression and World War II, but not so much that the agricultural character of the area was drastically modified. Even the Watts Riots of 1965 did not change that, although Willowbrook had a variety of buildings, including the community library of Willowbrook, damaged.

The blend of agricultural and residential land use persisted at Willowbrook into the early 1980s, when a redevelopment plan drawn up by the Watts Labor Community Action Committee from 1965 to 1993 and funded by Los Angeles County caused the area to lose its rural character. 365 acres (1.48 km^{2}) acres of Willowbrook land were redeveloped under this plan to include new commercial and residential facilities. The appearance of present-day Willowbrook is similar to other communities in the South Central section of Los Angeles because of this.

== Geography ==
Willowbrook is located at 33°55′3″N 118°15′10″W (33.917515, -118.252705).

According to the United States Census Bureau, the CDP has a total area of 1.7 square miles (4.4 km^{2}), over 99% of it land. Before the 2020 census, part of the Willowbrook CDP was transferred to the West Rancho Dominguez CDP, reducing the area of Willowbrook by more than half.

== Demographics ==
Historical population
Census	Pop.	Note	%±
1970	28,705		—
1980	30,845		7.5%
1990	32,772		6.2%
2000	34,138		4.2%
2010	35,983		5.4%
2020	24,295		−32.5%
U.S. Decennial Census; 1860–1870 1880-1890; 1900 1910 1920; 1930 1940 1950; 1960 1970 1980; 1990 2000 2010; 2020

Willowbrook first appeared as an unincorporated place in the 1970 U.S. census as part of the Compton census county division; and as a census designated place in the 1980 United States census.

=== Racial and ethnic composition ===
Willowbrook CDP, California – Racial and ethnic composition Note: the US Census treats Hispanic/Latino as an ethnic category. This table excludes Latinos from the racial categories and assigns them to a separate category. Hispanics/Latinos may be of any race.
Race / Ethnicity (NH = Non-Hispanic)	Pop 2000	Pop 2010	Pop 2020	% 2000	% 2010	% 2020
White alone (NH)	292	328	259	0.86%	0.91%	1.07%
Black or African American alone (NH)	15,089	12,172	4,365	44.20%	33.83%	17.97%
Native American or Alaska Native alone (NH)	63	48	32	0.18%	0.13%	0.13%
Asian alone (NH)	78	87	115	0.23%	0.24%	0.47%
Native Hawaiian or Pacific Islander alone (NH)	40	46	34	0.12%	0.13%	0.14%
Other race alone (NH)	53	73	86	0.16%	0.20%	0.35%
Mixed race or Multiracial (NH)	226	250	231	0.66%	0.69%	0.95%
Hispanic or Latino (any race)	18,297	22,979	19,173	53.60%	63.86%	78.92%
Total	34,138	35,983	24,295	100.00%	100.00%	100.00%

=== 2020 census ===
As of the 2020 census, Willowbrook had a population of 24,295. The population density was 14,495.8 inhabitants per square mile (5,596.9/km^{2}), and 100.0% of residents lived in urban areas with none in rural areas.

The median age was 30.8 years; 28.7% of residents were under the age of 18 and 8.9% were 65 years of age or older. There were 96.1 males for every 100 females, and 93.7 males for every 100 females age 18 and over.

The census reported that 98.8% of the population lived in households and 1.2% lived in non-institutionalized group quarters, with no residents institutionalized.

There were 5,780 households; 51.9% had children under the age of 18 living in them. Of all households, 39.8% were married-couple households, 8.8% were cohabiting couple households, 33.7% had a female householder with no partner present, and 17.7% had a male householder with no partner present. About 14.9% of all households were made up of individuals, and 6.5% had someone living alone who was 65 years of age or older. The average household size was 4.15, and there were 4,711 families (81.5% of households).

There were 5,958 housing units at an average density of 3,554.9 units per square mile (1,372.6 units/km^{2}), of which 97.0% were occupied. Of the occupied units, 43.3% were owner-occupied and 56.7% were renter-occupied; the homeowner vacancy rate was 0.4% and the rental vacancy rate was 2.8%.

Racial composition as of the 2020 census
Race	Number	Percent
White	2,339	9.6%
Black or African American	4,480	18.4%
American Indian and Alaska Native	533	2.2%
Asian	136	0.6%
Native Hawaiian and Other Pacific Islander	42	0.2%
Some other race	13,376	55.1%
Two or more races	3,389	13.9%
Hispanic or Latino (of any race)	19,173	78.9%

=== 2010 census ===
At the 2010 census, Willowbrook had a population of 35,983. The population density was 9,544.1 inhabitants per square mile (3,685.0/km^{2}). The racial makeup of Willowbrook was 8,245 (22.9%) White (0.9% Non-Hispanic White), 12,387 (34.4%) African American, 273 (0.8%) Native American, 119 (0.3%) Asian, 49 (0.1%) Pacific Islander, 13,858 (38.5%) from other races, and 1,052 (2.9%) from two or more races. There were 22,979 residents of Hispanic or Latino origin, of any race (63.9%).

The census reported that 35,577 people (98.9% of the population) lived in households, 116 (0.3%) lived in non-institutionalized group quarters, and 290 (0.8%) were institutionalized.

There were 8,721 households, 4,920 (56.4%) had children under the age of 18 living in them, 3,626 (41.6%) were opposite-sex married couples living together, 2,635 (30.2%) had a female householder with no husband present, 859 (9.8%) had a male householder with no wife present. There were 640 (7.3%) unmarried opposite-sex partnerships, and 38 (0.4%) same-sex married couples or partnerships. 1,336 households (15.3%) were one person and 585 (6.7%) had someone living alone who was 65 or older. The average household size was 4.08. There were 7,120 families (81.6% of households); the average family size was 4.38.

The age distribution was 11,790 people (32.8%) under the age of 18, 4,500 people (12.5%) aged 18 to 24, 9,595 people (26.7%) aged 25 to 44, 7,200 people (20.0%) aged 45 to 64, and 2,898 people (8.1%) who were 65 or older. The median age was 28.2 years. For every 100 females, there were 92.1 males. For every 100 females aged 18 and over, there were 89.2 males.

There were 9,600 housing units at an average density of 2,546.3 per square mile, of the occupied units 4,525 (51.9%) were owner-occupied and 4,196 (48.1%) were rented. The homeowner vacancy rate was 2.5%; the rental vacancy rate was 5.9%. 19,021 people (52.9% of the population) lived in owner-occupied housing units and 16,556 people (46.0%) lived in rental housing units.

According to the 2010 United States Census, Willowbrook had a median household income of $34,005, with 31.5% of the population living below the federal poverty line.

=== Income ===
In 2023, the US Census Bureau estimated that the median household income was $60,386, and the per capita income was $20,983. About 15.5% of families and 17.0% of the population were below the poverty line.

=== Mapping L.A. ===
According to Mapping L.A., Mexican (43.8%) and Unspecified African (1.6%) were the most common ancestries in 2000. Mexico (85.1%) and El Salvador (6.9%) were the most common foreign places of birth.

== Government ==
In the California State Legislature, Willowbrook is in the 35th senatorial district, represented by Democrat Laura Richardson, and in the 65th Assembly district, represented by Democrat Mike Gipson.

In the United States House of Representatives, Willowbrook is in California's 43rd congressional district, represented by Democrat Maxine Waters.

== Infrastructure ==
The Los Angeles County Sheriff's Department (LASD) operates the Century Station in Lynwood, serving Willowbrook.

The United States Postal Service Willowbrook Post Office is located at 2241 East El Segundo Boulevard in the CDP.

Martin Luther King, Jr. Community Hospital, replacing the King Drew Hospital − Martin Luther King, Jr. Multi-Service Ambulatory Care Center in 2015, is located in Willowbrook. The Charles R. Drew University of Medicine and Science and King Drew Magnet High School of Medicine and Science are adjacent.

=== Transportation ===
==== Metro Rail station and lines ====
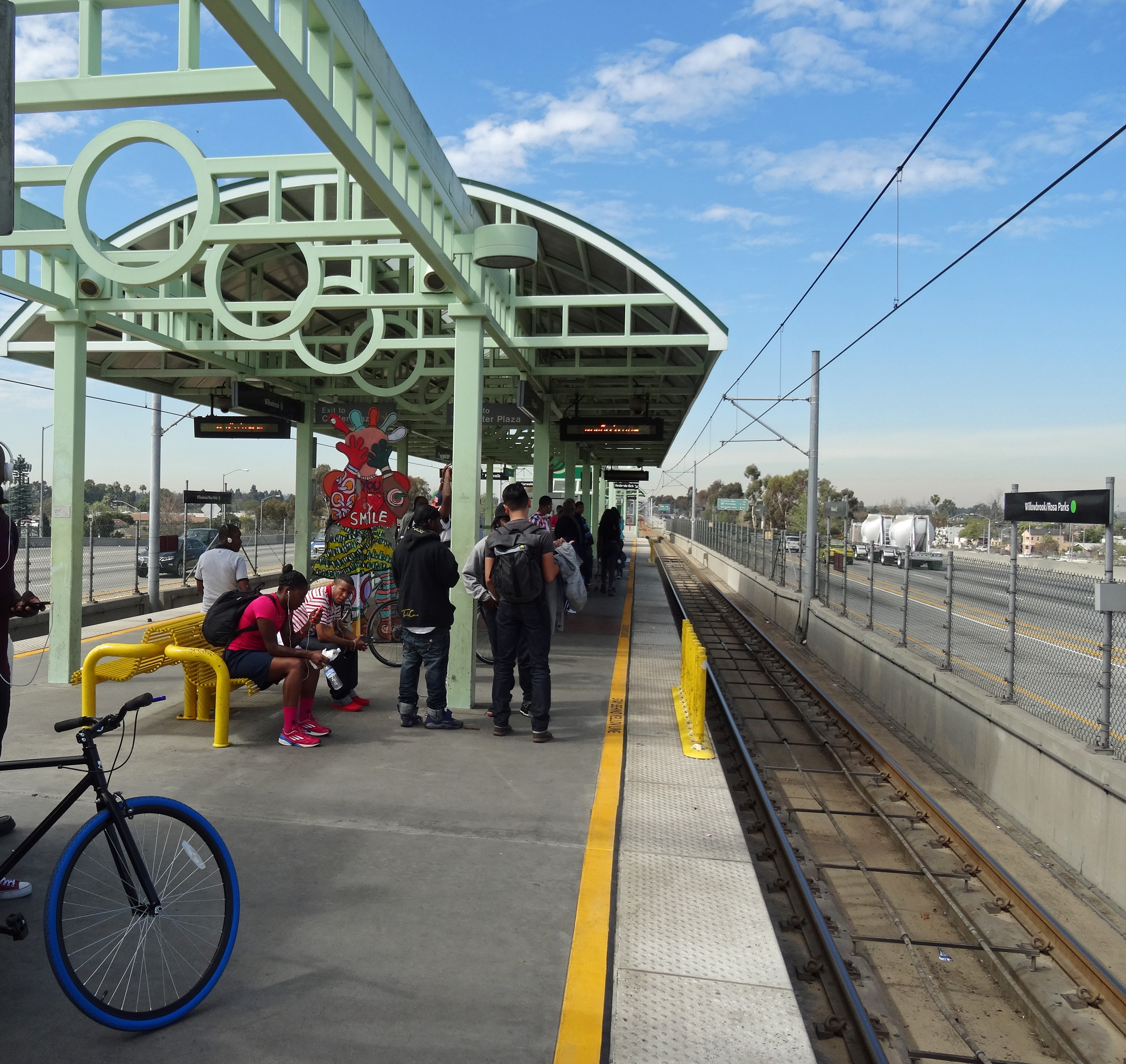
Willowbrook/Rosa Parks station, Los Angeles Metro Rail

Willowbrook/Rosa Parks station is a station on the A and C lines of the Los Angeles Metro Rail. The station is located in the Century Freeway (Interstate 105) median, above the intersection of Imperial Highway and Wilmington Avenue in Willowbrook. It is a major transfer point for commuters.

As a major transfer station, Willowbrook/Rosa Parks station is also a major bus hub, serving many bus routes operated by LA Metro and other regional/municipal transit agencies. The station also has park and ride facilities, including 975 parking spaces and 4 bike lockers. To the east of the station is the Metro Rail Operations Center, which is the dispatch hub for all Metro Rail trains.

==== Metro Bus routes ====
The Los Angeles County Metropolitan Transportation Authority (LA Metro) provides Metro Local bus services to and from the Willowbrook area.

The Los Angeles County Department of Public Works also operates two shuttle services that serve the Willowbrook area:

- Hahn's Trolley and Shuttle Service
- Rosewood Smart Shuttle.
- Willowbrook Link

== Education ==
=== Colleges and universities ===
Charles R. Drew University of Medicine and Science is located in Willowbrook.

=== Primary and secondary schools ===
Most residents are zoned to schools in the Compton Unified School District. Zoned elementary schools within the CDP include Anderson, Carver, Jefferson, King, and Lincoln. Bunche Middle School, Willowbrook Middle School and Centennial High School are located outside of the CDP in Compton. Cesar Chavez Continuation High School is in Willowbrook.

A portion is in the Los Angeles Unified School District.

=== Public libraries ===
LA County Library operates the Willowbrook Library at 11737 Wilmington Ave. inside the CDP.

== Parks and recreation ==
Los Angeles County operates area parks.

The 7.22-acre (29,200 m^{2}) George Washington Carver Park (previously Willowbrook Neighborhood Park) has a lighted baseball field, an arts and crafts room, a "Nike GO" outdoor basketball court, a community room, a lighted softball field, a multipurpose field, a multipurpose room, picnic areas with barbecue pits, and a swimming pool.

Earvin "Magic" Johnson County Recreation Area, a 94-acre (380,000 m^{2}) park, mostly in Willowbrook and partially in Los Angeles, has play areas for children, picnic areas with barbecue pits, soccer fields, toilet facilities, and walking paths. The California Office of Environmental Health Hazard Assessment has issued a safe eating advisory for any fish caught in Magic Mike Lakes due to elevated levels of mercury and PCBs.

Enterprise County Park, a 10-acre (40,000 m^{2}) park located in the Rosewood neighborhood in Willowbrook, has an athletic field, a lighted baseball/softball diamond, a community recreation room, a gymnasium, a multi-purpose field, picnic areas with barbecue pits, and a swimming pool.

Athens Park, a 20-acre (81,000 m^{2}) park, within the Athens Village area and in Willowbrook, has two lighted baseball/softball diamonds, a basketball court, children's play areas, a community recreation multipurpose room, a computer lab, a gymnasium, a multi-purpose field, picnic areas with barbecue pits, a swimming pool, tennis courts, and toilet facilities. Mona County Park, an 8.4-acre (34,000 m^{2}) park, has a lighted baseball/softball diamond, an outdoor basketball court, a children's play area, a community room, a gymnasium, a shaded picnic shelter, a swimming pool, and the Tiny Tot Learning Center.

== See also ==
- Willowbrook/Rosa Parks (Los Angeles Metro station)
- South Los Angeles
