= Medi-Cal =

California implementation of Medicaid

The California Medical Assistance Program (Medi-Cal or MediCal) is the California implementation of the federal Medicaid program serving low-income individuals, including families, seniors, persons with disabilities, children in foster care, pregnant women, and childless adults with incomes below 138% of federal poverty level. Benefits include ambulatory patient services, emergency services, hospitalization, maternity and newborn care, mental health and substance use disorder treatment, dental (Denti-Cal), vision, and long-term care and support. Medi-Cal was created in 1965 by the California Medical Assistance Program a few months after the national legislation was passed. Over 15.28 million people were enrolled in Medi-Cal as of September 2022, or about 40% of California's population; in Tulare County and Merced County, more than 50% of county residents were enrolled as of September 2015. As of 2025, about 56% of children in California use the program.

== Eligibility ==
Medi-Cal provides health coverage for people with low income and limited ability to pay for health coverage, including the old, blind, disabled, young adults and children, pregnant women, people in a skilled nursing or intermediate care home, and those in the Breast and Cervical Cancer Treatment Program (BCCTP). People receiving federally funded cash assistance programs, such as CalWORKs (a state implementation of the federal Temporary Assistance for Needy Families (TANF) program), the State Supplementation Program (SSP) (a state supplement to the federal Supplemental Security Income (SSI) program), foster care, adoption assistance, certain refugee assistance programs, or In-Home Supportive Services (IHSS) are also eligible.

Until January 1, 2024, when asset limits for Medi-Cal were abolished in favor of income limits, Medi-Cal imposed asset limits on certain prospective enrollees. Medi-Cal individuals who received long-term supportive services or who enroll in Medi-Cal through certain disabilities were subject to asset tests. This limit depended on the number of individuals being considered for coverage; for one enrollee, this limit was $2,000, while for two enrollees, the limit was $3,000. Each additional individual being considered resulted in an additional $150 of permitted assets, up to a total of ten individuals covered. If applicants possessed property whose total value exceeded the allowed amount, they were required to reduce ("sell down") their assets through activities such as purchasing clothes, purchasing home furnishings, paying medical bills, paying a home mortgage, paying home loans, and paying off other debts.

Beginning in 2014 under the Patient Protection and Affordable Care Act (PPACA), those with family incomes up to 138% of the federal poverty level became eligible for Medi-Cal (pursuant to 42 U.S.C. § 1396a(a)(10)(A)(i)(VIII)), and individuals with higher incomes and some small businesses may choose a plan in Covered California, California's health insurance marketplace, with potential federal subsidies. Medi-Cal has open enrollment year-round.

Lawful permanent residents (green card holders) are eligible for full-scope Medi-Cal in California regardless of their date of entry if they meet all other eligibility requirements, even if they have been in the United States for less than 5 years. Beginning in 2024, people without a lawful immigration status who meet the requirements for Medi-Cal are eligible for full-scope Medi-Cal. Previously, meeting eligibility requirements other than immigration status qualified them restricted-scope Medi-Cal limited to emergency and pregnancy-related services only unless they qualified for the Young Adult Expansion (YAE) or Older Adult Expansion (OAE), which allowed individuals ages 19–26 or those over the age of 50 full-scope benefits regardless of immigration status.

=== Application process ===
There are several ways to apply for Medi-Cal: at a Social Services office, over the phone by calling the nearest social service office, or online (the most common).

People in need of Medi-Cal often need help with their use of the online application process and face barriers, including:

- Rejection of applications due to insufficient explanation
- Repeated requests for additional documentation throughout the application process
- Unclear next steps and transitions in the application process, both for applications submitted directly to Medi-Cal and those initiated through Covered California
- Difficulty accessing support and personalized assistance, including in-language help and resources for Spanish- and Mandarin-speaking applicants
- Challenges in navigating Medi-Cal eligibility and enrollment during significant life transitions, including aging out of foster care, transitioning off a parent’s health insurance plan, giving birth, getting a divorce, or losing or gaining employer-sponsored insurance.
- Lack of access to the internet or finding the process confusing.

== Benefits ==
Medi-Cal health benefits include ambulatory patient services, emergency services, hospitalization, maternity and newborn care, mental health and substance use disorder treatment, dental (Denti-Cal), vision, and long-term care and supports. California is one of a few US states that provide Medicaid dental benefits to adults.

A patchwork of supplemental programs has grown up to fill in some of the gaps, including Federally Qualified Health Centers (FQHC), a designation that refers to hundreds of health clinics and systems that operate in underserved, low-income and uninsured communities.

== History ==
Medi-Cal was created in 1965 by the California Medical Assistance Program a few months after the national legislation was passed.

== Administration ==
=== Medi-Cal fee for service ===
As of December 2022, 2.2 million people were enrolled in Medi-Cal fee-for-service, representing 14.4% of all enrollees. In the fee-for-service arrangement, health care providers submit claims to the Medi-Cal program for services rendered.

=== Medi-Cal managed care ===
Most beneficiaries receive Medi-Cal benefits from contracted Medicaid managed care organizations (MCOs). As of January 2018, 10.8 million people were enrolled in a Medi-Cal managed care plan, representing about 81% of all enrollees.

California has several models of managed care which are designated at the county level:

- a County Organized Health System (COHS) model, with one health plan per county,
- a "two plan model" with one community health plan and one commercial health plan in the county,
- a geographic managed care model with multiple plans per county,
- a regional managed care model with 1-2 commercial health plans in many counties,
- and unique one-county models in San Benito, Imperial counties and the bi-county plan "CenCal Health" in San Luís Obispo and Santa Barbara.

In Denti-Cal, the majority of beneficiaries are covered through fee-for-service arrangements, where the state pays dentists directly for services, instead of the managed care model. However, more than 879,000 Denti-Cal enrollees do receive dental care through managed care plans started as experimental alternatives in the 1990s: in Los Angeles County where managed care plans are optional for beneficiaries, and in Sacramento County where they are mandatory. Eleven counties had no Denti-Cal providers or no providers willing to accept new child patients covered by Denti-Cal: Del Norte, Tehama, Yuba, Sierra, Nevada, Amador, Calaveras, Alpine, Mariposa, Mono and Inyo counties. Delta Dental, operating in the same building as DHCS' Denti-Cal division, enrolls dentists into DentiCal, processes claims by dentists, pays dentists and authorizes treatments, and also handles customer service operations and outreach.

==== Bridge to Reform waiver ====
In 2011, CMS approved a Section 1115 Medicaid waiver called Bridge to Reform. The program included an expansion of the patient-centered medical home primary care approach, an expansion of coverage with the Low Income Health Program (LIHP), and incentive pay-for-performance to hospitals via the Delivery System Reform Incentive Pool (DSRIP). It also made enrollment in managed care plans (as opposed to fee-for-service programs) mandatory for people with disabilities with the intention of improving care coordination and reducing costs. The DSRIP program showed improvements in quality of care and population health, with less improvement in cost of care.

Renewal of the waiver in 2015 extended the program to 2020 in an initiative called Medi-Cal 2020, with additional programs including additional alternative payment systems, the Dental Transformation Initiative, and the Whole Person Care program focused on high-risk, high-utilizing recipients. In the negotiation with CMS, several proposals were dropped.

==== Contractual requirements ====
Medi-Cal enforces requirements on MCOs with contracts, with boilerplate versions posted online; these contracts the primary way that the state affects the operations, quality, and coverage of managed care plans. In 2005, the California Health Care Foundation recommend various steps to improve the plans, which resulted in some changes to the contracts.

=== Government agencies ===
Medi-Cal is jointly administered by the Centers for Medicare and Medicaid Services (CMS) and the California Department of Health Care Services (DHCS), while the county welfare department in each of the 58 counties is responsible for local administration of the Medi-Cal program. C4Yourself and CalWIN are statewide online application systems that allows you to apply for benefits.

County welfare departments and Medi-Cal managed care plans
County	Department/Agency	SAWS consortium	Managed care model	Managed care plan(s)
Alameda	Social Services Agency	CalWIN	Single-plan plus Kaiser	Alameda Alliance for Health, Kaiser Permanente
Alpine	Department of Social Services	C4Yourself	Two-plan	Anthem Blue Cross, Mountain Valley Health Plan
Amador	Department of Social Services	C4Yourself	Single-plan plus Kaiser	Anthem Blue Cross, Kaiser Permanente
Butte	Department of Employment and Social Services	C4Yourself	COHS	Partnership HealthPlan of California
Calaveras	Department of Calaveras Works and Human Services	C4Yourself	Regional	Anthem Blue Cross, Health Net Community Solutions
Colusa	Department of Health and Human Services	C4Yourself	COHS	Partnership HealthPlan of California
Contra Costa	Department of Employment and Human Services	CalWIN	Single-plan plus Kaiser	Contra Costa Health Plan, Kaiser Permanente
Del Norte	Department of Health and Human Services	C4Yourself	COHS	Partnership HealthPlan of California
El Dorado	Department of Human Services	C4Yourself	Two-plan plus Kaiser	Anthem Blue Cross, Mountain Valley Health Plan, Kaiser Permanente
Fresno	Department of Social Services	CalWIN	Two-plan plus Kaiser	Anthem Blue Cross, CalViva Health, Kaiser Permanente
Glenn	Human Resources Agency	C4Yourself	COHS	Partnership HealthPlan of California
Humboldt	Department of Health and Human Services	C4Yourself	COHS	Partnership HealthPlan of California
Imperial	Department of Social Services	C4Yourself	Single-plan plus Kaiser	Community Health Plan of Imperial Valley, Kaiser Permanente
Inyo	Department of Health and Human Services	C4Yourself	Regional	Anthem Blue Cross, Health Net Community Solutions
Kern	Department of Human Services	C4Yourself	Two-plan plus Kaiser	Anthem Blue Cross, Kern Family Health Care, Kaiser Permanente
Kings	Human Services Agency	C4Yourself	Two-plan plus Kaiser	Anthem Blue Cross, CalViva Health, Kaiser Permanente
Lake	Department of Social Services	C4Yourself	COHS	Partnership HealthPlan of California
Lassen	Lassen WORKS	C4Yourself	COHS	Partnership HealthPlan of California
Los Angeles	Department of Public Social Services	LEADER	Two-plan plus Kaiser	L.A. Care Health Plan, Health Net, Kaiser Permanente
Madera	Department of Social Services	C4Yourself	Two-plan plus Kaiser	Anthem Blue Cross, CalViva Health, Kaiser Permanente
Marin	Department of Health and Human Services	C4Yourself	COHS plus Kaiser	Partnership HealthPlan of California, Kaiser Permanente
Mariposa	Department of Human Services	C4Yourself	COHS plus Kaiser	Central California Alliance for Health, Kaiser Permanente
Mendocino	Health and Human Services Agency	C4Yourself	COHS	Partnership HealthPlan of California
Merced	Human Services Agency	C4Yourself	COHS	Central California Alliance for Health
Modoc	Department of Social Services	C4Yourself	COHS	Partnership HealthPlan of California
Mono	Department of Social Services	C4Yourself	Regional	Anthem Blue Cross, Health Net Community Solutions
Monterey	Department of Social and Employment Services	C4Yourself	COHS	Central California Alliance for Health
Napa	Department of Health and Human Services	C4Yourself	COHS plus Kaiser	Partnership HealthPlan of California, Kaiser Permanente
Nevada	Human Services Agency	C4Yourself	COHS	Partnership HealthPlan of California
Orange	Social Services Agency	CalWIN	COHS plus Kaiser	CalOptima, Kaiser Permanente
Placer	Department of Health and Human Services	CalWIN	COHS plus Kaiser	Partnership HealthPlan of California, Kaiser Permanente
Plumas	Department of Social Services	C4Yourself	COHS	Partnership HealthPlan of California
Riverside	Department of Public Social Services	C4Yourself	Two-plan plus Kaiser	Inland Empire Health Plan, Molina Healthcare, Kaiser Permanente
Sacramento	Department of Human Assistance	CalWIN	Geographic Managed Care (GMC)	Molina Healthcare, Anthem Blue Cross, Health Net, Kaiser Permanente
San Benito	Health and Human Services Agency	C4Yourself	COHS	Central California Alliance for Health
San Bernardino	Department of Human Services	C4Yourself	Two-plan plus Kaiser	Inland Empire Health Plan, Molina Healthcare, Kaiser Permanente
San Diego	Health and Human Services Agency	CalWIN	Geographic Managed Care (GMC)	Blue Shield of California Promise Health Plan, Molina Healthcare, Health Net, Kaiser Permanente, Community Health Group San Diego
San Francisco	Human Services Agency	CalWIN	Two-plan plus Kaiser	San Francisco Health Plan, Anthem Blue Cross, Kaiser Permanente
San Joaquin	Human Services Agency	C4Yourself	Two-plan plus Kaiser	Health Net, Health Plan of San Joaquin, Kaiser Permanente
San Luis Obispo	Department of Social Services	CalWIN	COHS	CenCal Health
San Mateo	Human Services Agency	CalWIN	COHS plus Kaiser	Health Plan of San Mateo, Kaiser Permanente
Santa Barbara	Department of Social Services	CalWIN	COHS	CenCal Health
Santa Clara	Social Services Agency	CalWIN	Two-plan plus Kaiser	Santa Clara Family Health Plan, Anthem Blue Cross, Kaiser Permanente
Santa Cruz	Department of Human Services	CalWIN	COHS plus Kaiser	Central California Alliance for Health, Kaiser Permanente
Shasta	Health and Human Services Agency	C4Yourself	COHS	Partnership HealthPlan of California
Sierra	Department of Social Services	C4Yourself	COHS	Partnership HealthPlan of California
Siskiyou	Department of Human Services	C4Yourself	COHS	Partnership HealthPlan of California
Solano	Department of Health and Social Services	CalWIN	COHS plus Kaiser	Partnership HealthPlan of California, Kaiser Permanente
Sonoma	Department of Human Services	CalWIN	COHS plus Kaiser	Partnership HealthPlan of California, Kaiser Permanente
Stanislaus	Community Services Agency	C4Yourself	Two-plan plus Kaiser	Health Net, Health Plan of San Joaquin, Kaiser Permanente
Sutter	Department of Human Services	C4Yourself	COHS plus Kaiser	Partnership HealthPlan of California, Kaiser Permanente
Tehama	Department of Social Services	C4Yourself	COHS	Partnership HealthPlan of California
Trinity	Dept of Health and Human Services	C4Yourself	COHS	Partnership HealthPlan of California
Tulare	Health and Human Services Agency	CalWIN	Regional plus Kaiser	Anthem Blue Cross, California Health & Wellness, Health Net Community Solutions, Kaiser Permanente
Tuolumne	Department of Social Services	C4Yourself	Regional	Anthem Blue Cross, Health Net Community Solutions
Ventura	Human Services Agency	CalWIN	COHS plus Kaiser	Gold Coast Health Plan, Kaiser Permanente
Yolo	Department of Employment and Social Services	CalWIN	COHS plus Kaiser	Partnership HealthPlan of California, Kaiser Permanente
Yuba	Department of Health and Human Services	C4Yourself	COHS plus Kaiser	Partnership HealthPlan of California, Kaiser Permanente

=== Law ===
Federal law mostly consists of the Social Security Amendments of 1965 which added Title XIX to the Social Security Act (42 U.S.C. § 1396 et seq.), and related California law mostly consists of California Welfare and Institutions Code (WIC) Division 9, Part 3, Chapter 7 (WIC § 14000 et seq.). Federal regulations are mostly found in Code of Federal Regulations (CFR) Title 42, Chapter IV, Subchapter C (42 CFR 430 et seq.); while California's regulations are contained in California Code of Regulations (CCR) Title 22, Division 3 (22 CCR § 50005).

=== Costs ===
Medi-Cal costs are estimated at $73.9 billion ($16.9 billion in state funds) in 2014–15. For comparison, the entire California state budget in 2014-2015 is $156 billion, of which about $108 billion was general funds (not allocated for special expenditures, such as bonds).

== Related programs ==
=== Long-Term Care Partnership ===
The Long-Term Care Partnership Program is a public-private partnership between states and private insurance companies, designed to reduce Medicaid expenditures by delaying or eliminating the need for some people to rely on Medicaid to pay for long-term care services. To encourage the purchase of private partnership policies, long-term care insurance policyholders are allowed to protect some or all of their assets from Medicaid spend-down requirements during the eligibility determination process, but they still must meet income requirements. The California Partnership for Long-Term Care Program links Medi-Cal and the In-Home Supportive Services program, i.e., private long-term care insurance and health care service plan contracts that cover long-term care for aged, blind, or disabled persons.

=== Covered California ===
Covered California is the health insurance marketplace in California, the state's implementation of the American Health Benefit Exchange provisions of the Patient Protection and Affordable Care Act.

=== Indigent health programs ===
Since 1933, California law has required counties to provide relief to the poor, including health care services and general assistance. County indigent medical programs can be categorized as California Medical Service Program (CMSP) and Medically Indigent Service Program (MISP) counties. There are 34 CMSP counties and 24 MISP counties. The CMSP county programs are largely managed by the state, whereas MISP counties manage their own programs with their own rules and regulations. Many patients from both the CMSP and MISP county programs transitioned to Medi-Cal when the Patient Protection and Affordable Care Act took effect in 2014.

=== In-Home Supportive Services ===
In-Home Supportive Services (IHSS) is a Medi-Cal program that offers home care services to eligible people over the age of 65, the blind, and/or disabled as an alternative to out-of-home care in California.

== Quality of care metrics ==
Medi-Cal reports quality metrics, broadly similar to the HEDIS metrics from the NCQA.

In 2017, it reported on 13 of the 20 frequently reported from the CMS Medicaid/CHIP Child Core Set and 15 of 19 frequently reported from the CMS Medicaid Adult Core Set.

== See also ==
- Healthcare in California
- Welfare in California
- Local government in California
- Health care districts in California
