= Washington Healthplanfinder =

Washington Healthpathfinder
Agency overview
- Jurisdiction: Health insurance marketplace for U.S. state of Washington
- Website: www.wahealthplanfinder.org

Washington Healthplanfinder is one of the fourteen health insurance marketplaces in the United States and was created in accordance with the Patient Protection and Affordable Care Act, commonly referred to as Obamacare.

Washington Healthplanfinder is a state-operated website that allows residents of the state of Washington to shop for and to sign up for medical insurance with a private insurance company. Individuals who sign up may also obtain subsidies from the state that cover a portion of the insurance premiums in accordance with Obamacare. The subsidies may be paid directly to the insurance company. The premium payments (minus subsidy) are paid directly to the insurance company by the insured individual.

Individuals who obtained subsidies during the year must include this information when filing their income tax return the following April (U.S. tax returns are due on April 15 every year).

In order to maintain coverage individuals must sign up every year during the open enrollment period. The open enrollment period for 2017 was November 1, 2016 until January 31, 2017.

== History ==
The Washington Health Benefit Exchange (Exchange) was created in statute to meet a key provision of the Affordable Care Act that called for each state to establish a new marketplace that would offer health benefits to individuals, families, and small businesses. Under national health care reform, states were required to have an Exchange in place by Jan. 1, 2014.

These new marketplaces were to be developed and implemented either by the state or by the United States Department of Health and Human Services. Washington State's governor and legislators chose to implement a state-based exchange model and, in 2011, passed legislation to establish the state's new marketplace as a "public-private partnership," separate and distinct from the state. This legislation's strong governance model and public-private structure provided an innovative approach that other states would adopt in creating their own exchanges. The Exchange has a close working relationship with the Washington State Health Care Authority, Office of the Insurance Commissioner, and the Department of Social and Health Services.

In 2012, legislation was passed that established market rules, requirements for qualified health plans (QHPs), essential health benefits, and other key elements of the state's Exchange. This legislation also enabled the Exchange to focus on developing its operations and information technology (IT) platform, which was critical to meeting the tight timeline of beginning operations on Oct. 1, 2013, the beginning of the first open enrollment period.

Until the middle of 2015 insured individuals paid their premiums to the Washington Health Benefit Exchange, since then payments are made directly to the insurance company.

The Exchange is responsible for the creation of Washington Healthplanfinder, the online portal to facilitate the shopping and enrolling in health and dental insurance.

== Approved insurance companies ==
=== Qualified health plans for individuals and families ===
- BridgeSpan
- Community Health Plan of Washington
- Coordinated Care
- Kaiser Permanente Washington
- Health Alliance Northwest
- Kaiser Foundation Health Plan of the Northwest
- LifeWise Health Plan of Washington
- Molina Health Care of Washington
- Premera Blue Cross
- Regence BlueShield of Washington
- UnitedHealthcare

=== Qualified health plans for small businesses ===
- Kaiser Foundation Health Plan of the Northwest
- Kaiser Permanente Washington
- UnitedHealthcare

=== Qualified pediatric dental plans ===
- Delta Dental of Washington
- Dental Health Services
- Kaiser Permanente
- LifeWise
- Premera Blue Cross

== Exchange funding and sustainability ==
The Exchange received initial operational and implementation funding through federal grant dollars totaling $302,333,310. A substantial amount of the grant funding was used to develop the IT system critical to determining eligibility for and enrolling residents in health plans. To determine eligibility appropriately, the IT system has essential integration points with state and federal agencies and carriers. The grant funding was also used to support activities, such as the development of the navigator program and a marketing campaign. Beginning in 2015, the Exchange was required to be self-sustaining and has been appropriated funds by the state legislature. The Exchange sustainability is tied to three funding sources established in statute: (1) the existing 2 percent tax on health insurance premiums sold through Washington Healthplanfinder; (2) reimbursement for activities performed on behalf of Washington Apple Health (the state's Medicaid program), and; (3) an agreed upon carrier assessment. The Exchange was provided with $110 million for operation in the recently passed 2015-17 biennial budget.

== Exchange governance ==
The Exchange is run by an 11-member bipartisan board composed of a chair and eight voting members appointed by the Governor. Board members are nominated by the Republican and Democratic caucuses in both the State House and State Senate. The Exchange board must have expertise in a variety of health care areas including employee benefits, health economics, consumer advocacy, individual insurance, small group insurance, and health plan administration. The Director of the Health Care Authority and Insurance Commissioner are ex-officio, non-voting board members. There are currently 10 stakeholder committees, technical advisory committees, or workgroups, including a technical advisory committee for key program areas including the navigator program, agents and brokers, health equity, and outreach. There are also three workgroups that address plan management, consumers, and tribal issues.

== Customer support network ==
Washington Healthplanfinder has a network of customer support across Washington State to help customers enroll in health and dental insurance.

== See also ==
- Health insurance in Washington (state)
