= Healthcare in New York City =

Overview of the health care system in New York City

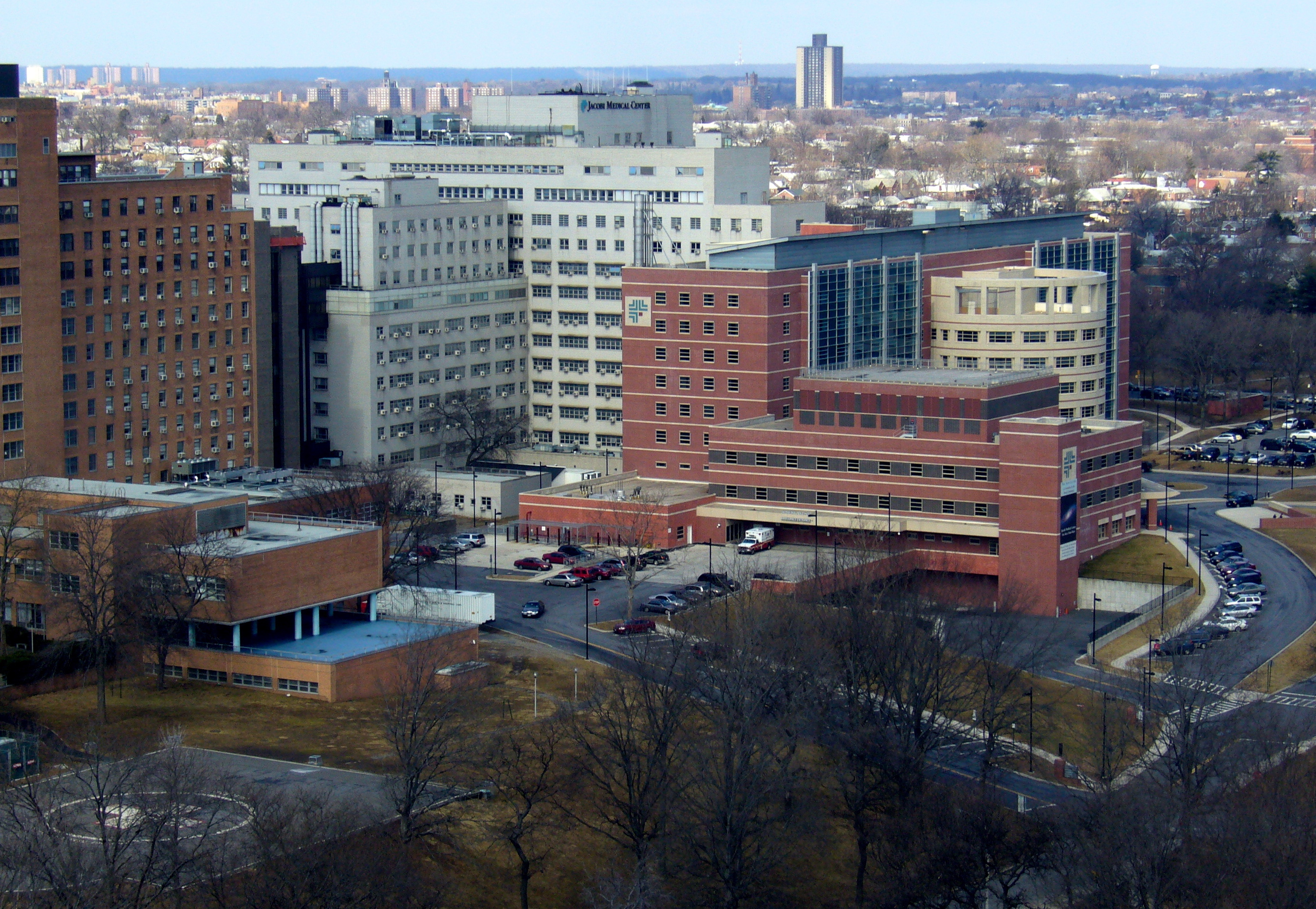
Aerial view of the Jacobi Medical Center in the Morris Park section of The Bronx, New York City

Healthcare in New York City describe the health care services available in New York City, the largest US city with a population of over eight million.

Many health care systems in place in New York developed from nonprofit charitable organizations.

== Insurance ==
The system of healthcare in the United States does not provide health care to the country's entire population. Instead, most citizens are covered by a combination of private insurance and various federal and state programs. As of 2017, health insurance was most commonly acquired through a group plan tied to an employer.

NY State of Health is the health insurance marketplace for city residents aimed at lowering costs. NYC Health + Hospitals has the MetroPlus health insurance plans for lower-income residents, and NYC Care for no- or low-cost services for residents who do not qualify for or cannot afford health insurance.

== Health infrastructure ==
=== Government ===
The NYC Department of Health and Mental Hygiene is the primary local government body and one of the largest local public health organizations in the world. The State Department of Financial Services regulates health insurance. NYC Health + Hospitals is a public benefit corporation that operates hospitals and clinics and serves over one million residents annually.

=== Medical schools ===
Medical schools in New York City include:

- SUNY Downstate College of Medicine in Brooklyn
- Albert Einstein College of Medicine in the Bronx
- CUNY School of Medicine, Touro College of Osteopathic Medicine, Columbia University Vagelos College of Physicians and Surgeons, Weill Cornell Medicine, Icahn School of Medicine at Mount Sinai, and New York University School of Medicine in Manhattan

== Health and healthcare disparities ==
In 2010, the health department began a program to document health disparities. The first report focused on disparities in life expectancy and death, and stated that death rates were 30% higher in the poorest New York City neighborhoods than the wealthiest. A 2011 report examining breast, colorectal, and cervical cancer stated that while breast cancer diagnoses were highest among high-income white women, low-income Black women had the highest rate of death.

=== Emergency care ===
In 2000, a report from The Commonwealth Fund found that nearly three-quarters of emergency room visits in New York City were for non-emergent healthcare needs or could have been treated in a primary care setting. The report concluded that reducing strain on hospital emergency departments, the city's primary care system required significant expansion and barriers to care for low-income patients and those without health insurance needed to be reduced.

=== Access ===
Access to healthcare continues to be an issue. The cost of living in the city has forced many New Yorkers to opt out of insurance because of the high costs. New Yorkers living in low-income communities or who are unemployed have limited access to quality healthcare. The NYC Health + Hospitals program attempts to improve healthcare availability for these residents.

=== COVID-19 ===
The first case of the COVID-19 pandemic was confirmed in March 2020. By April, the COVID-19 pandemic in New York City had more confirmed coronavirus cases than China, the United Kingdom, or Iran, and by May, had more cases than any other individual country. This created a scarcity of hospital beds and available intensive care unit space. NYC instituted emergency measures, including the deployment of the hospital ship USNS Comfort, and the creation of temporary field hospitals, although these were little used. The ongoing pandemic is the deadliest disaster by death toll in the city's history.

==== Early pandemic ====
The pandemic exposed health care disparities. Prior to the pandemic, the Upper East Side of Manhattan had 27 times more primary care providers than Elmhurst and Corona, or eight times the city average. The same Queens communities had a COVID-19 infection rate four times that of Manhattan's East Side and a death rate six times higher. Multiple reports showed that minority communities in New York City were severely affected by COVID-19, partially due to higher population density in minority-dominated neighborhoods and a higher rate of comorbidities.

==== COVID-19 testing ====
A 2020 study found that COVID-19 testing in New York City was more egalitarian than income distribution. However, the same study found significant disparity in test results across income levels. Comparing the poorest ZIP codes to the wealthiest revealed a 38 to 65 percent difference in negative tests.

==== Vaccination ====
Early distribution of COVID-19 vaccines faced logistical obstacles including supply issues. In some cases, concerns over eligibility led vaccine doses to be discarded. In early January 2021, New York State responded by expanding its eligibility criteria. Despite this, short supply, extended wait times, and difficulties with eligibility and registration remained obstacles. In addition, early data showed demographic disparities in vaccine distribution. As of January 31, 2021, 48% of people receiving vaccine doses were reported as white, compared with 11%, 15%, and 15% of Black, Asian, and Latinx individuals respectively, though 40% of vaccine recipients at the time had not had demographic data collected. Vaccine hesitancy has been an issue, especially in low-income neighborhoods. Many Black New Yorkers cited fear and suspicion of the government entities advocating vaccination. Vaccination rates improved significantly with city and state mandates.

== See also ==
- COVID-19 pandemic in New York City
- Healthcare in New York (state)
- Involuntary hospitalization of Joyce Patricia Brown
- History of public health in New York City
