= Mountain Health CO-OP =

Health Insurance CO-OP

- Formerly: Montana Health CO-OP (2010-2020)
- Type: 501(c)(3)Nonprofit
- Industry: Health Insurance
- Founded: December 2010 (15 years ago)
- Headquarters: Helena, Montana
- Areas served: Montana, Idaho
- Key people: Blair Fjeseth (CEO)
- Members: 55,000
- Subsidiaries: Mountain Health Gives
- Website: mountainhealth.coop

Mountain Health CO-OP, formerly Montana Health CO-OP, is a nonprofit, member-led health insurance company that currently offers products in Montana and Idaho. The company was founded as a health insurance cooperative under a provision of the Patient Protection and Affordable Care Act for the purpose of introducing more competition into state insurance markets.

Operating since 2012, it is one of three remaining health cooperatives in the United States, along with Common Ground Healthcare Cooperative and Community Health Options.

== History ==
Mountain Health CO-OP, originally founded as Montana Health CO-OP, opened in the state of Montana under a provision of the Affordable Care Act and was first offered on the federal health insurance exchange. Its creation made it the third insurance provider in Montana, along with the Blue Cross Blue Shield Association and PacificSource.

In December 2010, Mountain Health was formed by attorney and former Montana Insurance Commissioner John Morrison, prominent Montana health insurance consultants Richard Miltenberger and Jim Edwards, and internal medicine physician Tom Roberts. The group formed a board of directors, and submitted an application for CO-OP funding in 2011. The application work was led by Eric Schindler and Larry Turner, both former Blue Cross and Blue Shield of Montana executives.

In February 2012 the Montana group became one of the first CO-OPs to receive a federal loan of $58 million to begin operations as a nonprofit, member-controlled insurer. Jerry Dworak became the first CEO of the CO-OP soon after in July.

In 2013, insurance policies in Montana opened on the online federal health insurance exchange (HealthCare.gov) which then began in early 2014. After, MHC was quickly able to win close to 40% of the insurance market.

In November 2014, Mountain Health began selling coverage plans to residents in Idaho on the Idaho health insurance exchange (Your Health Idaho) that took effect in January 2015. Previous marketing director Karen Early said, “[Montana Health] became operational in Idaho because there was a need for greater competition in the state of Idaho.” This venture was aided by a $25 million federal loan for expansion efforts. While still operating as Montana Health CO-OP in Montana, in Idaho they went as Mountain Health CO-OP.

In 2014 they saw losses of about $3 million and losses of $40 million in 2015 after congress had undercut funding for health CO-OPs, yet they were still able to stay in operation. On December 10, 2015, DistilInfo reported that then CEO Jerry Dworak and board member John Morrison said that despite these losses they believed “that co-ops have introduced more competition into the marketplace and ultimately saved consumers money.”

Starting in December 2016, Mountain Health voluntarily paused enrollment for new members in the Montana market for 9 months to boost financial reserves and avoid facing closure like many of the other CO-OPs were seeing at the time. This precaution was taken to ensure that they were not overextending their resources by taking on too many members, allowing them to stay financially stable.

This year they also were seeing the effects of the reduction in risk-corridor payments that occurred back in 2014. This reduction in funding that was supposed to help with keeping costs lower for insurers had threatened Mountain Health's ability to keep selling in Idaho. What helped them through this period was an $8 million surplus note given by St. Luke's Health System in Boise that was paid back in full. This loan aided the CO-OP in reaching Idaho requirements and continue selling products in their market.

By August 2017, Mountain Health was one of just four CO-OPs still standing.

In 2018, MHC was involved in a legal suit against the US federal government Montana Health CO-OP v. United States over the cancellation of cost-sharing reduction payments which the government had ended in October 2017. The New York Times said that these payments helped insurers by "reducing deductibles, co-payments and other out-of-pocket costs for low-income consumers." The federal court ruled in September of that year that Mountain Health was entitled to federal compensation for these cancelled payments.

Later, in May 2018, the Mountain Health board of directors selected Richard Miltenberger as their new CEO after his tenure as President and CEO of InterWest Health.

On November 22, 2020, it was announced that MHC would be expanding into Wyoming making it the second insurance company on Wyoming’s marketplace to offer individual policies. Insurance plans officially began on January 1, 2021 and ended December 31, 2026. This year, the CO-OP also transitioned to using the name Mountain Health CO-OP across all states.

On May 15, 2024, Blair Fjeseth was selected unanimously by the board of directors as their new CEO after previously holding the position of COO. This made her one of the youngest CEO's in the industry.

== Current Organization ==
A unique aspect of Mountain Health is that the board of directors is composed of a majority of policy-holding members who are all elected by other CO-OP members. Jeremy Johnson, professor and previous board member said, "Ideally these boards will prove more attentive to the needs of consumers than the management of traditional insurance companies." Currently, 15 people on the CO-OP's board are members.

As of 2023, the CO-OP covers a total of around 55,000 members, providing individual and group coverage for roughly 40,900 members: 27,000 enrollees in Montana, 7,700 in Idaho, and 6,200 in Wyoming.

== Benefits ==
Mountain Health CO-OP offers benefits to members on their individual and group plans across both of the states they are active in. These include dental and vision reimbursements, preventative care and prescription coverage, zero-cost out-of-pocket prescriptions and supplies including free insulin, depression medication and asthma medication.

== Mountain Health Gives ==
Mountain Health Gives Logo

Mountain Health Gives is a nonprofit affiliate group formed by Mountain Health CO-OP in 2021 with the help of a $750,000 funding gift from attorney and former state Auditor John Morrison which came out of a remainder account of a class action lawsuit. It began in November 2022 with the election of Molly Severtson as the full-time executive director. Their purpose is to help fill gaps in insurance coverage for residents living in the states that Mountain Health does business in.

In January 2023 they started their first initiative, Little Peeps, which is a program that offers free vision screenings, eye exams, and glasses to children. The Daily Inter Lake reports that their $750,000 in funding will help to provide more than 3,000 vision exams and 800 pairs of glasses annually over the first seven years of their operation.

== Legal History ==
=== Montana Health CO-OP v. United States ===
On January 30, 2018, Mountain Health CO-OP filed a claim against the United States government over unpaid cost-sharing reduction (CSR) payments from 2017. CSR payments were one of the provisions set up under the Affordable Care Act to help with lowering out-of-pocket costs through the government making periodic payments to insurance companies that would cover for reductions in member's plans. In 2017, President Donald Trump cancelled these CSR payments on the grounds that the Obama administration had overstepped its executive authority by requiring Congress to appropriate the funds.

Mountain Health argued that the ACA had mandated that the federal government was to make these payments, regardless of whether or not Congress had appropriated the funds for it. In defense, the U.S. Department of Health and Human Services argued, "The Obama administration unfortunately went ahead and made CSR payments to insurance companies after requesting — but never ultimately receiving — an appropriation from Congress as required by law."

The court ruled in favor of Mountain Health, finding that the government had a statutory obligation to make these payments and that it was irrelevant if congress had not appropriated the funds or not. As such, the MHC was awarded $1.2 million in CSR payments for the fourth quarter of 2017. Montana Health CO-OP v. United States was the first judicial decision nationally to hold that the Trump administration wrongly withheld "cost sharing reduction" (CSR) payments from insurance carriers that participated in the ACA created insurance exchanges.

Mountain Health brought another legal action, by the same name, that challenged the federal government's underpayment of risk corridor payments under the ACA and resulted in a $56.7 million judgment for the CO-OP following the United States Supreme Court's ruling in Maine Community Health Options v. United States.
