= Pennie (disambiguation) =

Pennie is the health insurance marketplace for the U.S. state of Pennsylvania.

Pennie may also refer to the following persons:

- Alex Pennie (born 1985), British musician
- Aloysius Pennie (born 1984), Liberian footballer
- Chris Pennie (born 1977), American drummer
- Collins Pennie (born 1985), American actor
- Fiona Pennie (born 1982), British slalom canoeist
- Ken Pennie (born 1949), Canadian Air Force general
- Terje Pennie (born 1960), Estonian actress
