= FFM =

FFM may refer to:

== Companies and organizations ==
- Fairchild Fashion Media, an American publisher
- Felivaru Fisheries, a state-owned fishery company in the Maldives
- Football Federation of Macedonia, a Macedonian sports association
- Freedom Foundation of Minnesota, an American think tank
- Firefly (airline), a Malaysian airline (ICAO code: FFM)

== Science and technology ==
- Fat free mass, a measure of body composition
- Five factor model, alternate term for Big Five personality traits
- "Focus follows mouse", a method of assigning focus (computing) in a graphical user interface
- Free fall machine, a device for simulating a free-fall environment for biological samples
- Full face mask, alternate term for Full face diving mask

== Other uses ==
- Federally Facilitated Marketplace, health insurance exchange established by the US government
- Fergus Falls Municipal Airport, in Minnesota, United States (IATA code: FFM)
- Fox Family Movies, an Asian television channel
- Frankfurt am Main, city in Germany
- Maasina Fulfulde language, spoken in western Africa (ISO 639-3 code: ffm)
- Festival Filem Malaysia (Malaysia Film Festival)
- Festival des Films du Monde (Montreal World Film Festival)
