= Association for Community Affiliated Plans =

- Abbreviation: ACAP
- Formation: 2000
- Type: Trade association
- Purpose: To represent and strengthen not-for-profit, safety net health plans as they work with providers and caregivers in their communities to improve the health and well being of vulnerable populations in a cost-effective manner
- Headquarters: Washington, D.C.
- Region served: United States
- CEO: Margaret Murray (2001)
- Website: www.communityplans.net

The Association for Community Affiliated Plans (ACAP) is a national trade association representing 85 nonprofit health plans. Headquartered in Washington, D.C., ACAP advocates on behalf of its community-affiliated member health plans operating throughout the United States. ACAP's advocacy work focuses on representing publicly sponsored programs and health care providers who serve vulnerable populations. ACAP also promotes universal access to quality and cost-efficient care.

ACAP members are Medicaid-focused health plans that serve the safety net. Collectively, ACAP plans serve more than 30 million enrollees, which is over 50 percent of individuals enrolled in Medicaid-focused health plans.

== History ==
In the 1980s, as Medicaid managed care expanded across the country, safety net providers, such as Community Health Centers (CHCs) and public hospitals, feared that managed care would reduce reimbursements for Medicaid-eligible services, making it more difficult for them to provide care to the uninsured and underinsured, and result in a loss of Medicaid volume, as beneficiaries would choose to see other providers once given a choice.

In response to these concerns, community health centers in at least 16 states banded together to establish their own managed care organizations. Often CHCs were the only sponsors, but in other cases, they joined with hospitals or other safety net providers to sponsor a health plan. These organizations were established to support the financial viability of the CHCs and other sponsors, and to support the mission of care for the underserved.

In 2000, seventeen CHC-affiliated plans came together with the help of the US Health Resources and Services Administration to form the Association for Health Center Affiliated Health Plans (AHCAHP). In May 2001, the Board hired Meg Murray as its executive director. Later that year, the AHCAHP Board met in Portland, Oregon to develop a strategic plan to guide the work of the association over the next two years. AHCAHP’s vision, as developed during that meeting, was to improve the health of medically underserved populations through the development, survival, promotion and growth of CHC-affiliated health plans.

In October 2003, the Board agreed to expand full membership to like-minded, community-affiliated health plans that served a majority of members from public insurance programs and shared the same outlook as the existing AHCAHP plans. The name change to the Association for Community Affiliated Plans (ACAP) reflected the new mission and membership.

In 2007, ACAP worked with its member plans to expand their mission to include work on Medicare Special Needs Plans (SNPs).

In 2019, ACAP began representing partner or associate plans that do not have a Medicaid contract but are nonprofit plans in the health insurance marketplace.

== ACAP Member Plans ==
ACAP Member Plans include:

- Arizona: Banner University Health Plans
- California: Alameda Alliance for Health, CalOptima, CenCal Health, Central California Alliance for Health, Community Health Group, Contra Costa Health, Gold Coast Health Plan, Health Plan of San Joaquin, Health Plan of San Mateo, Inland Empire Health Plan, Kern Family Health Care, L.A. Care Health Plan, Partnership HealthPlan of California, Santa Clara Family Health Plan, San Francisco Health Plan
- Colorado: Colorado Access, Denver Health
- Connecticut: Community Health Network of Connecticut
- DC: AmeriHealth Caritas District of Columbia, Health Care Services for Children with Special Needs, MedStar Family Choice
- Delaware: AmeriHealth Caritas Delaware
- Florida: Community Care Plan
- Georgia: CareSource Georgia
- Hawaii: AlohaCare
- Illinois: CountyCare-Cook County Health
- Indiana: MDwise
- Louisiana: AmeriHealth Caritas Louisiana
- Maryland: Priority Partners, Maryland Physicians Care, MedStar Family Choice
- Massachusetts: Commonwealth Care Alliance, Fallon Health Plan, Well Sense Health Plan
- Michigan: Blue Cross Complete of Michigan
- Minnesota: Hennepin Health, South Country Health Alliance, UCare
- New Hampshire: AmeriHealth Caritas New Hampshire, Well Sense Health Plan
- New York: Amida Care, Elderplan & Homefirst, Hamaspik Choice, iCircle Care, MetroHealthPlus, Nascentia Health, VillageCareMAX, VNS Health
- North Carolina: Alliance Health, AmeriHealth Caritas North Carolina, Partners Health Management, Trillium Health Resources, Vaya Health
- Ohio: CareSource
- Oregon: CareOregon, Yamhill Community Care
- Pennsylvania: AmeriHealth Caritas Pennsylvania, Geisinger Health Plan, Jefferson Health Plans, UPMC for You
- Rhode Island: Neighborhood Health Plan of Rhode Island
- South Carolina: SelectHealth of South Carolina
- Texas: Community First Health Plans, Community Health Choice, Cook Children's Health Plan, Dell Children's Health Plan, Driscoll Health Plan, El Paso Health, Parkland Community Health Plan, Texas Children's Health Plan
- Utah: University of Utah Health Plans
- Washington: Community Health Plan of Washington
- Wisconsin: Chorus Community Health Plan

== ACAP Partner/Associate Plans ==
- Idaho: Mountain Health CO-OP, St Luke's Health Plan
- Maine: Community Health Options
- Maryland: Maryland Community Health System
- Montana: Mountain Health CO-OP
- Texas: Sendero Health Plans
- Wisconsin: Common Ground Healthcare Cooperative
- Wyoming: Mountain Health CO-OP
