= CBHC =

CBHC may refer to:

- Canadian Bushplane Heritage Centre
- Campaign for Better Health Care
- Royal Commission on the Ancient and Historical Monuments of Wales, abbreviated CBHC in Welsh
