= California Health Care Foundation =

American non-profit organization

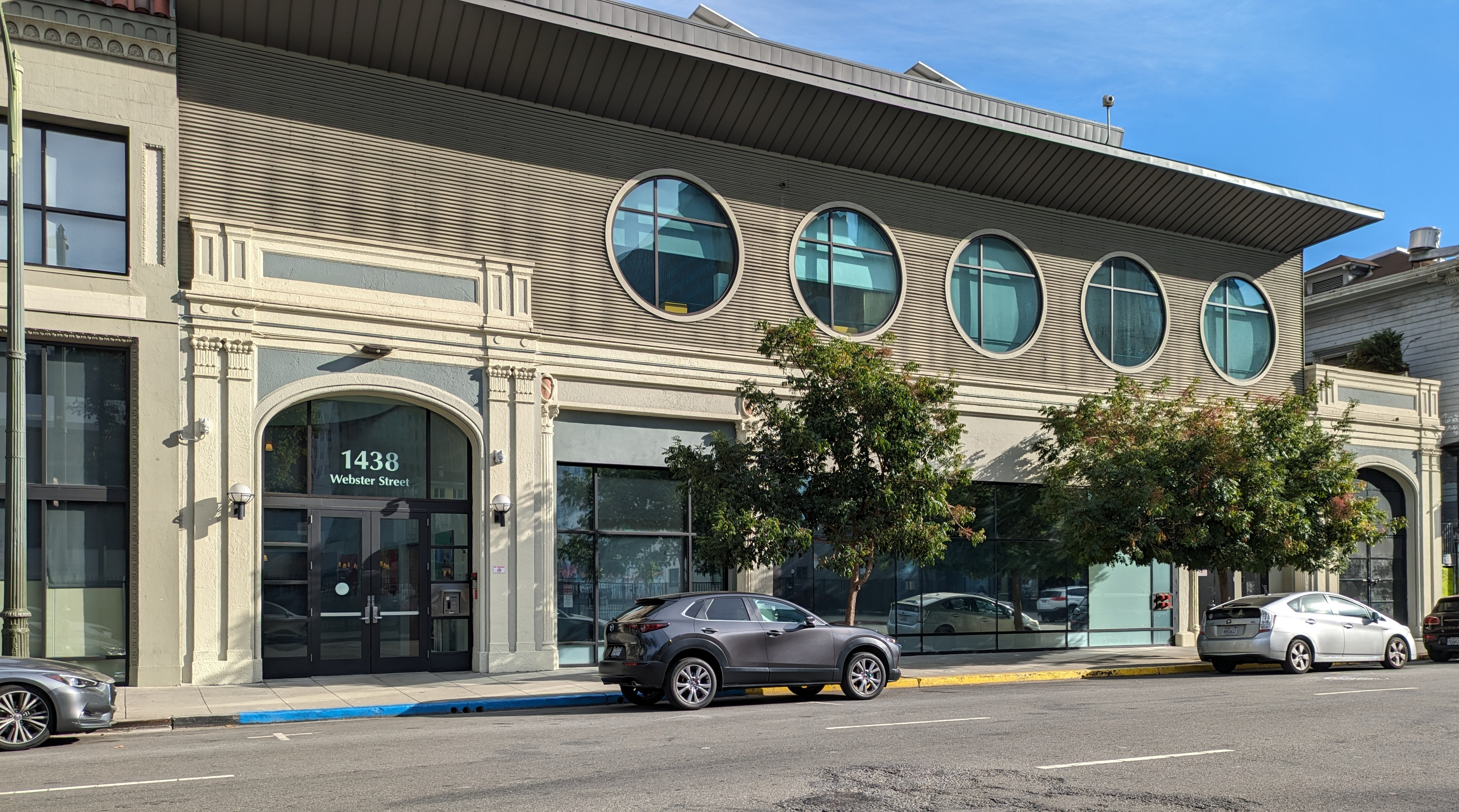
- 1438 Webster Street, location of CHCF's Oakland office
- Founded: 1996
- Type: Social Welfare Organizations
- Tax ID no.: 95-4523231
- Purpose: Improving access to coverage and care for low-income Californians, ensuring high-value care, and informing decisionmakers
- Locations: Oakland, California; Sacramento, California
- Region served: Improving health care in California
- Method: Grants to conduct research and analysis and program-related investments
- Key people: Dr. Sandra R. Hernández, President and CEO
- Employees: 50
- Website: www.chcf.org

Based in Oakland, California, the California Health Care Foundation (CHCF) is an independent, nonprofit philanthropy that focuses on improving the health care system for the people of California, especially low-income Californians. The organization has three main goals: improving access to coverage and care, promoting high-value care, and investing in people, knowledge, and networks that help to make meaningful change possible in California’s health care system.

Established in 1996, CHCF operates with an endowment of more than $750 million in assets and has paid out more than $500 million to support its programmatic work.

== Inception ==
The California Health Care Foundation was one of two philanthropies created in 1996 as a result of Blue Cross of California’s conversion from a nonprofit health plan to a for-profit corporation, WellPoint (now Anthem). CHCF’s first responsibility was managing the sale of WellPoint Health Networks stock. Of the $3 billion yielded from this process, four-fifths of the proceeds went to create The California Endowment and the remainder, some $600 million at the time, stayed with CHCF. From its inception, CHCF has looked for opportunities to improve health care in California by supporting higher quality, greater efficiency, and broader access to care.

== Leadership ==
Dr. Sandra R. Hernández became president and CEO of the California Health Care Foundation in January 2014. Prior to joining CHCF, Hernández was CEO of The San Francisco Foundation, which she led for 16 years. She previously served as director of public health for the City and County of San Francisco.

Hernández is an assistant clinical professor at the University of California, San Francisco, School of Medicine. She practiced at San Francisco General Hospital in the AIDS clinic from 1984 to 2016. She was appointed by Governor Jerry Brown to the Covered California board of directors in February 2018. She is a graduate of Yale University and the Tufts University School of Medicine.

Previously, the foundation had been led for 18 years by founding president and CEO Mark D. Smith.

== Resources ==
CHCF provides information and resources on a wide range of issues that contribute to achieving a more efficient, effective, accessible, and high-quality health care system. Resources include:

- The CHCF Health Care Leadership Program, which helps clinicians develop into effective leaders.
- The California Improvement Network, which provides quality improvement training and networking opportunities for frontline providers.
- The CHCF Health Innovation Fund, which provides program-related investments to companies that are developing low-cost solutions to improve care in the safety net.
- The California Health Care Almanac, which provides data and analysis on health care costs, coverage, quality, and the delivery system to support effective decisionmaking.
- The State Health Policy Office, which provides policymakers and other stakeholders with data and information, as well as opportunities to convene with colleagues to discuss issues related to the financing and delivery of health care in California.
- The California Opioid Safety Network, which is a community of local coalitions working across the state to share strategies and best practices toward the shared goal of reducing opioid addition and related deaths.

Additionally, CHCF supports health journalism, helping to strengthen the capacity of nonprofits to cover health policy in California and nationally.

== Publications ==
CHCF commissions and publishes research on a wide variety of topics related to the financing and delivery of health care in California. The CHCF Blog draws on experts from inside and outside CHCF to share their health policy insights. A selection includes:

- Health Care Costs 101, published as part of CHCF's California Health Care Almanac, provides general background on US medical spending. It details how much is spent on health care in the US, which services are purchased, and who pays. A related interactive data visualization, "US Health Care Spending: Who Pays?" shows national spending trends from 1960 to 2016 by payer.
- CHCF’s ACA Repeal Resource Page collected data resources and analyses of the potential impact of the repeal of the Affordable Care Act on California.
- Moving Medi-Cal Forward on the Path to Delivery System Transformation is a report published in 2016 that articulates a pathway for advancing Medi-Cal delivery system and payment reform. An accompanying landscape assessment provides an overview of how Medi-Cal operates, how it is financed, and how it performs, as well as some insight into people who use the program. A video of an interview with the report’s author is also featured.
- Opportunities for Emerging Technologies in the Medicaid Market is a compilation of resources for investors about the myriad opportunities for innovation within the Medicaid market. Despite being the nation's largest health insurer, Medicaid remains largely overlooked by investors and entrepreneurs.
- "Poll Reveals Californians' Views on ACA, Medi-Cal, and Insurance for Behavioral Health Treatment" summarizes findings from a California-wide Berkeley IGS poll commissioned by CHCF. The poll found that, when it was taken, support for the ACA was at an all-time high and that there was strong bipartisan agreement on the importance of Medi-Cal to the state. CHCF commissions polls to take the pulse of Californians on timely health care topics.
- Mental Health in California: For Too Many, Care Not There, published as part of CHCF's California Health Care Almanac, provides an overview of mental health in California: disease prevalence, suicide rates, supply and use of treatment providers, and mental health in the correctional system, plus data on spending and quality of care.
- Why Health Plans Should Go to the "MAT" in the Fight Against Opioid Addiction describes the role that health plans can play in preventing overdose deaths by improving access to medication-assisted treatment.
- "In Their Own Voices: California's Community Paramedics Tell Their Stories" is a CHCF blog article featuring a series of videos of community paramedics talking about their experiences with locally designed pilot projects that were designed to demonstrate different ways to prevent emergencies and connect people to the right care at the right time.
