= Vermont Health Connect =

Health insurance marketplace

Agency overview
- Jurisdiction: Health insurance marketplace for U.S. state of Vermont
- Website: healthconnect.vermont.gov

Vermont Health Connect is the health insurance marketplace, previously known as health insurance exchange, in the U.S. state of Vermont, created in accordance with the Patient Protection and Affordable Care Act. The marketplace operates a website.

The marketplace is offered to individuals and families who are not covered by their employer. It allows enrollees to compare health insurance plans and provides those who qualify with access to tax credits.

== History ==
The Vermont marketplace web site was developed by CGI Group.

Enrollment via the marketplace began on October 1, 2013. Mark Larson, Commissioner of the Department of Vermont Health Access (DVHA), said there were more than 30,000 people who logged in during the first four days of October. Larson stepped down from his position in March 2015.

There have been problems with the service, including billing related issues, which the state is trying to overcome.
