= Lincoln School (Providence, Rhode Island) =

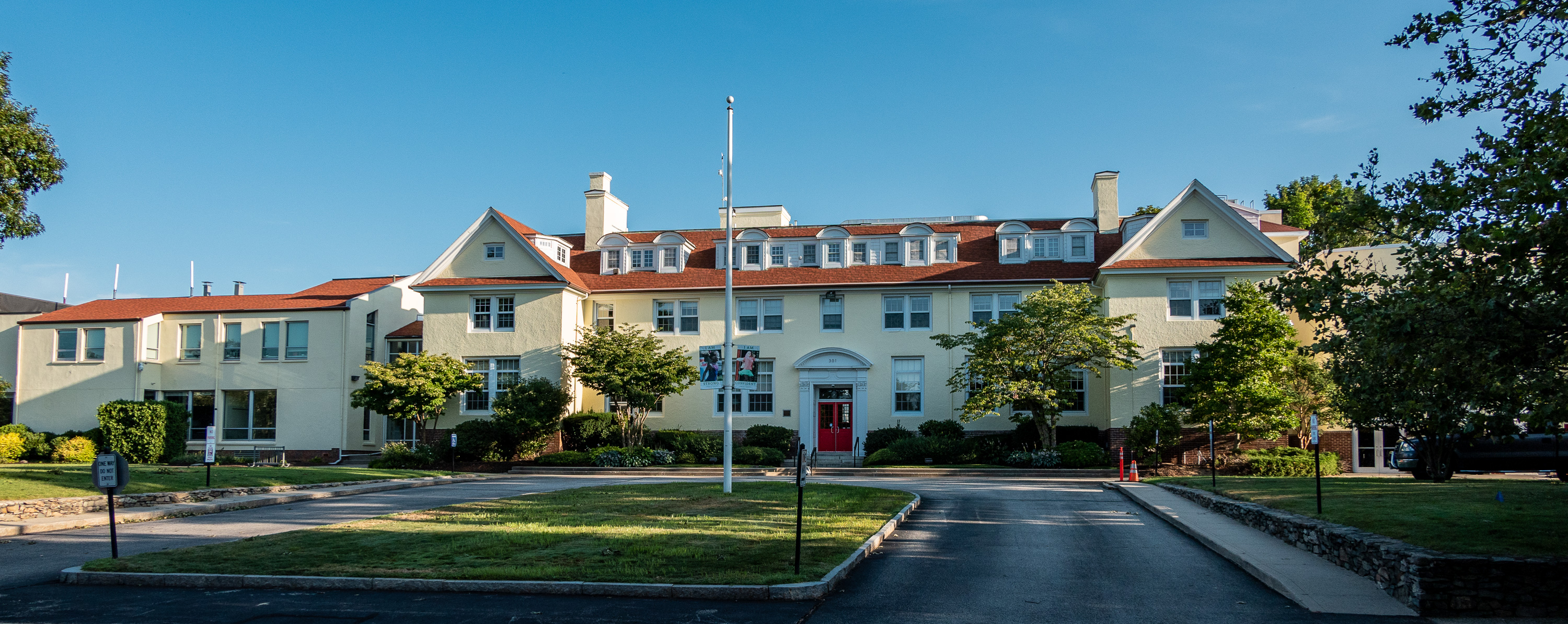
- Lincoln School's main building

Location
- Providence, RI; USA; 41°49′59″N 71°22′59″W

Information
- Type: Private,
- Religious affiliation: Quaker
- Established: 1884
- Head of School: Sophie Glenn Lau
- Faculty: 102
- Gender: Co-ed 6 weeks–Pre-K | All-girls K–12
- Enrollment: 450
- Average class size: 13 students
- Campus: Urban
- Colors: Green and White
- Athletics: 9 sports
- Mascot: Lynx

Lincoln School is a college preparatory school in Providence, Rhode Island offering advanced education in small classes to girls from Kindergarten through Grade 12, with a co-educational Little School (6 weeks to Pre-K).

== History ==
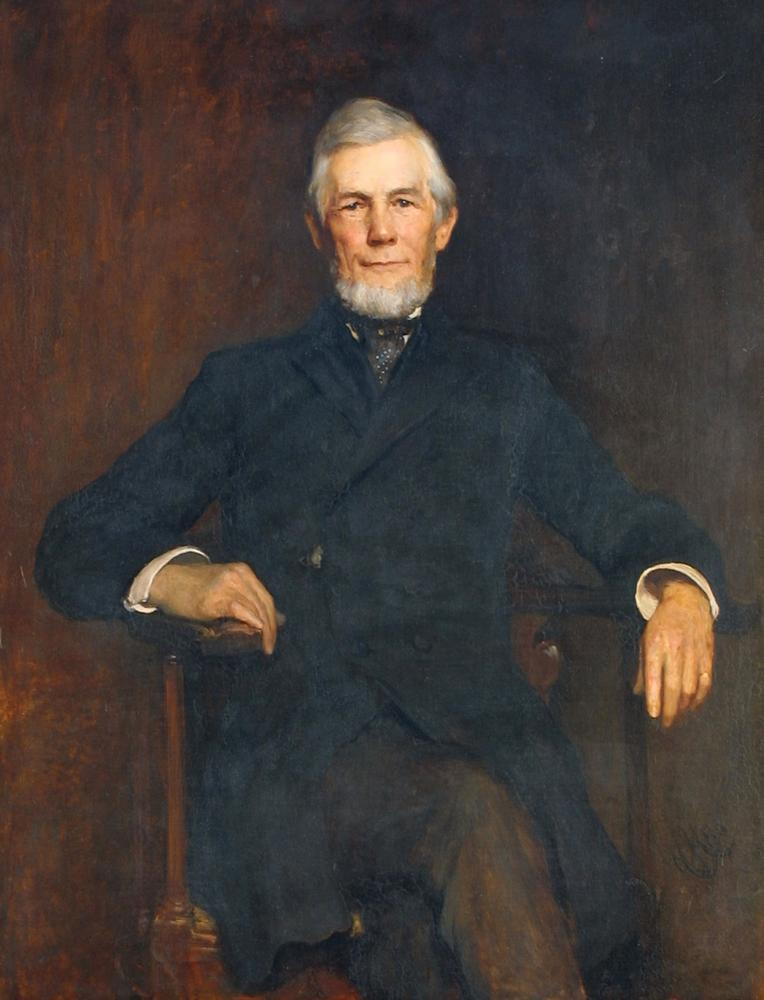
John Larkin Lincoln, painted by Hubert von Herkomer

Founded in 1884, by Mrs. William Ames in order for her daughter Margarethe Lyman Dwight to go to a real school, Lincoln School was named in honor of John Larkin Lincoln in 1888, a Brown University professor with a strong commitment to the education of girls and young women.

Lincoln moved to its present site on Butler Avenue in 1913, expanding its campus and physical plant in the ensuing years to accommodate the School's growing N-12 program, the Little School, and arts and athletic programs.

In 1924, Lincoln School became a Quaker School and is an active member of the Friends Council on Education. In 1980, Lincoln acquired Faxon Farm in Rehoboth, Massachusetts. It was named in honor of alumna, Connie Briggs Faxon '36, to support the school's growing interscholastic sports program.

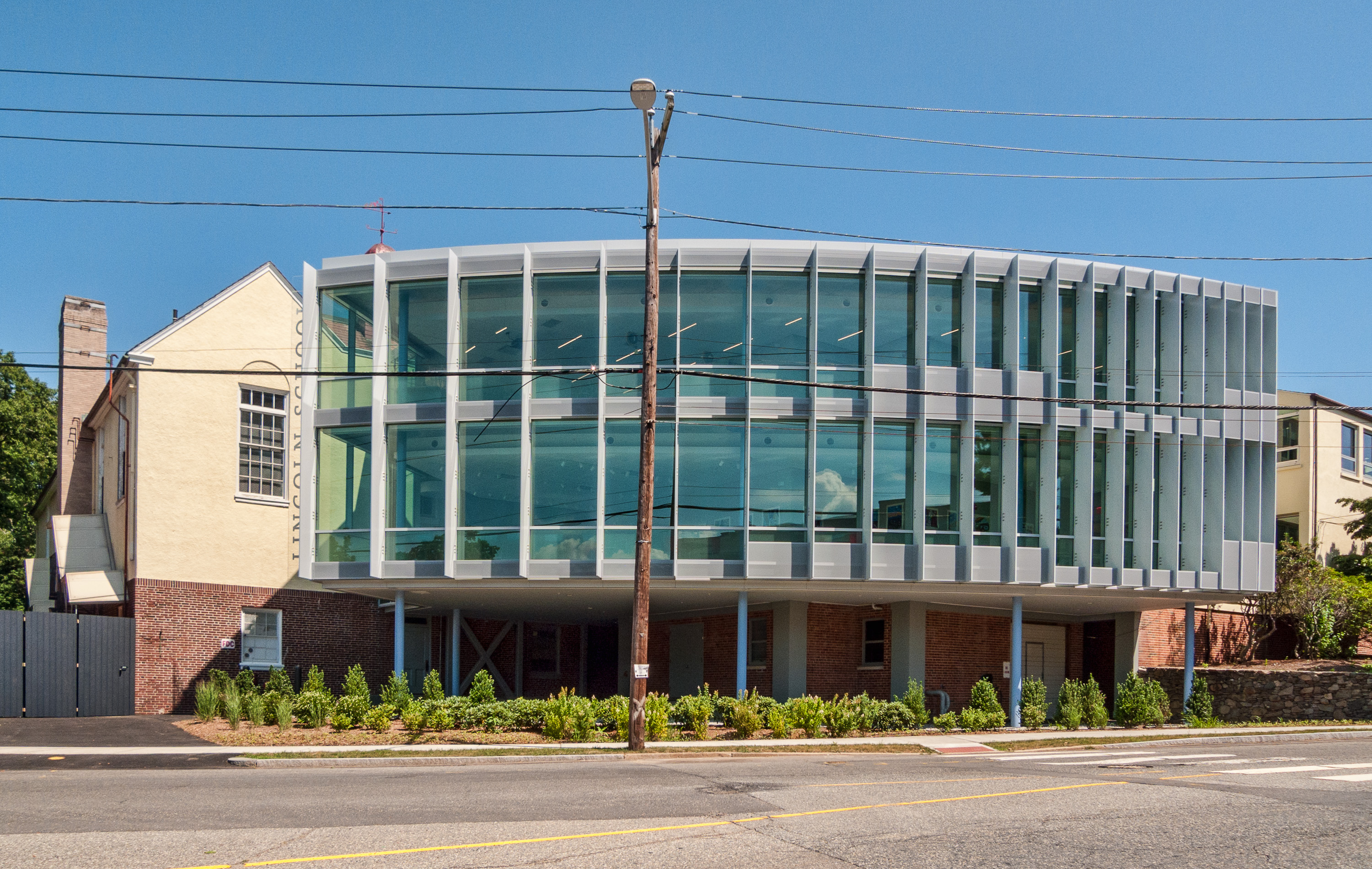
STEAM Hub

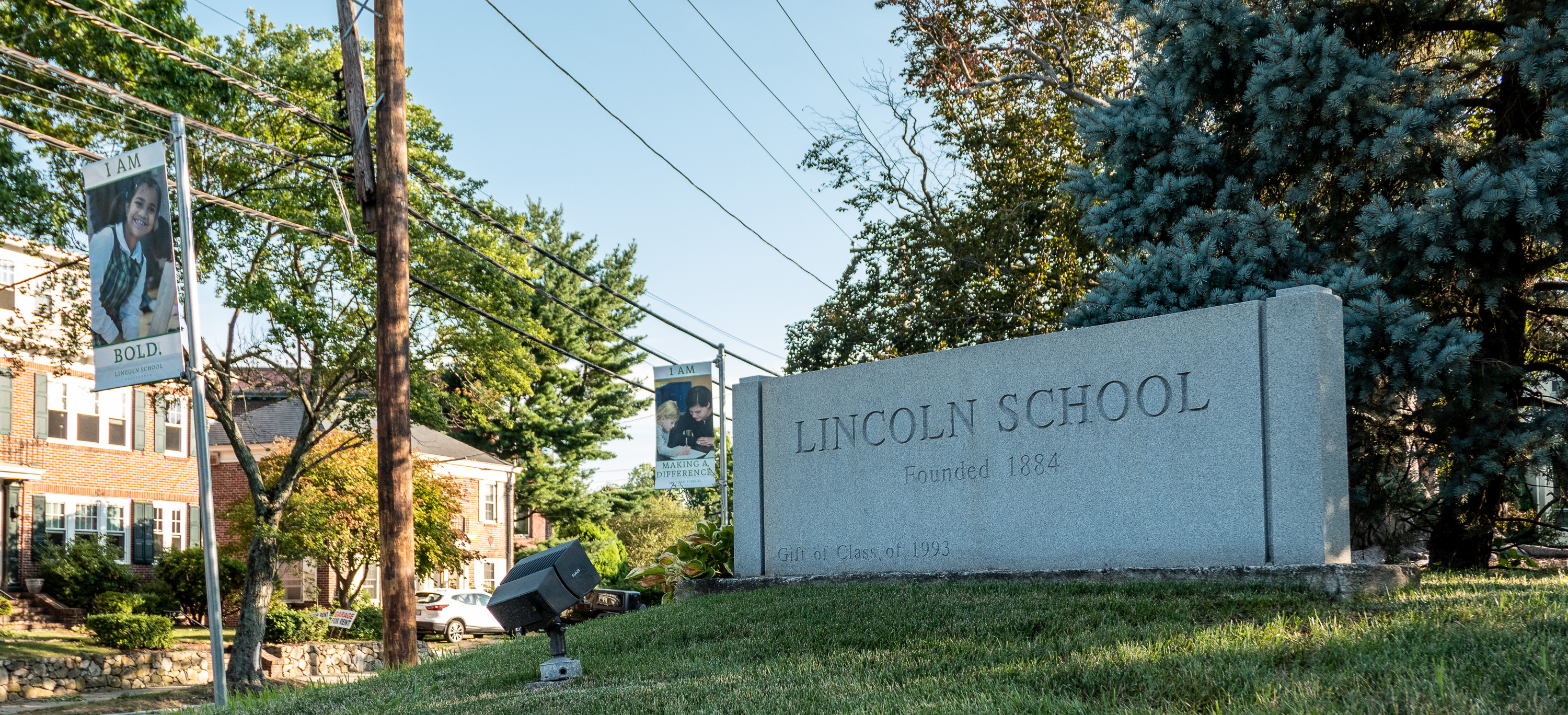
Sign at Butler Avenue entrance

In 2018, Lincoln School completed construction on STEAM Hub, a modern two-story glass building on Blackstone Boulevard designed by LLB Architects (Lerner Ladds Bartels) at a cost of $5 million. The building is Lincoln's new home for science, technology, engineering, and math, art and architecture.

== Notable alumni ==
- Glenna Collett-Vare
- Jill Craybas
- Christine C. Ferguson
- Louise Herreshoff
- Jane Kramer
- Harriet Metcalf
- Dee Ocleppo
- Edith Pearlman
- Amy Van Nostrand
- Meredith Vieira
- Helena Foulkes
