= Health Care Justice Act =

Law passed in Illinois, US

Illinois State Legislature
- Full name: Health Care Justice Act
- Introduced: February 19, 2003
- House voted: April 1, 2003 (60-45)
- Senate voted: May 19, 2004 (31-26)
- Signed into law: August 20, 2004
- Sponsor(s): William Delgado (House); Barack Obama (Senate)
- Governor: Rod Blagojevich
- Code: Illinois Compiled Statutes
- Section: 20 ILCS 4045
- Bill: HB 2268
- Website: full text

Status: Repealed

The Health Care Justice Act (HCJA) was a law in Illinois that sought "to insure that all residents have access to quality health care at costs that are affordable". The Health Care Justice Campaign (a project of Campaign for Better Health Care) led public advocacy for the act, which was passed after a two-year fight and took effect on July 1, 2004. In the state legislature, the act was spearheaded by the chair of the Senate Health and Human Services Committee, Barack Obama.

While originally intended to establish single-payer healthcare in the state, the act's ultimate form was more modest. The act created a task force and "strongly encouraged" the Illinois General Assembly to implement a health care access plan by July 1, 2007, that would meet eight objectives including providing access to a full range of healthcare services, maintaining and improving healthcare quality, and providing "portability of coverage, regardless of employment status".

The struggle to pass the HCJA prefigured many of the struggles over federal healthcare reform later in the decade.In particular, supporters and opponents regarded the struggle over the HCJA as foreshadowing the struggle over the federal Affordable Care Act during the Obama presidency. The struggle over implementing the task force recommendations figured in the governor's impeachment in 2009.

After the federal Affordable Care Act became law in 2010, the General Assembly repealed the HCJA and created the Illinois Health Benefits Exchange.

== Background ==
State Senator Obama, the incoming chair of the Senate's Health and Human Services Committee, first introduced a version of the act in 2003 following a conversation with Jim Duffett, founder of the Campaign for Better Health Care. This initial version mandated that the General Assembly enact a single-payer healthcare system in 2007. However, after the point was raised that it was unconstitutional for one session of the General Assembly to bind another session, Obama withdrew the bill.

== Provisions ==
The act encouraged Illinois to create a health care plan that would provide preventive, acute and long-term health care services to all citizens of Illinois. It also suggests the importance of not only ensuring availability for health care, but continuing to maintain and improve the quality of health care services.

Section 5 of the act acknowledges that the U.S. census reports that 1.8 million Illinoisans are without healthcare at any given time and that access to affordable quality healthcare is depleting (Illinois General Assembly). Section 5 urges that Illinois should work to provide both accessible and quality health care of all its residents. Section 15 outlines a plan that Illinois should attempt it implement after the effective date of the bill. This plan includes: access to a full range of preventive, acute, and long-term health care services; maintaining and improving the quality of healthcare in Illinois; coverage regardless of employment status; cost-containment measures; reviewing and implementing multiple approaches to preventive medicine based on new technologies; and promotes affordable coverage for small business market. Section 20 of the HCJA outlines the aforementioned establishment of the Adequate Healthcare Task Force. And finally, Section 25 requires that the Adequate Healthcare Task Force will hold public hearings in all Congressional Districts for community input on the issues of the HCJA.

== Implementation ==
=== Task force ===
The act created the Adequate Health Care Task Force (AHCTF), composed of 29 voting members, to submit recommendations for a health care access plan to the General Assembly. Five of the members were appointed by the Governor of Illinois, and six were appointed by each constitutional leader of the General Assembly: the Speaker of the House, the House Minority Leader, the President of the Senate, and the Senate Minority Leader. The directors of the Department of Public Health, Healthcare and Family Services & Aging, and the Department of Human Services were nonvoting members ex officio.

The AHCTF held public hearings on the state of healthcare and health insurance coverage in every congressional district in the state. It announced the resulting plan on December 7, 2006, with support from hospitals, unions, doctors, and consumer rights and healthcare advocacy groups.

=== Coverage Expansion Plan ===
On January 26, 2007, the AHCTF presented its consensus plan, called the "Adequate Health Care Task Force Health Care Coverage Expansion Plan", to the Illinois General Assembly. The main goals from the plan are to create "cost effective, high quality care while minimizing administrative spending on health care". In order to achieve those goals the Expansion Plan focuses in "workers, employers, and taxpayers contribution for coverage and optimize the use of Federal matching funds" which then from those contribution all the Illinoisans including does who are at the poverty level will get the health care coverage while reducing "administrative costs for all Illinoisans." The Expansion Plan focused on balancing the spending and getting all the support to get enough funding so that all Illinoisans can receive good health care.

=== Illinois Covered ===
Governor Rod Blagojevich incorporated some of the AHCTF's recommendations into a legislative proposal called "Illinois Covered", which he announced in 2007. AHCTF member Jim Duffett estimated that the governor's proposal included 85% of what the AHCTF had recommended.

Illinois Covered never became law, due to the deteriorating relationship between the legislature and the governor. The plan had an estimated cost of US$2.1 billion. Blagojevich proposed a gross receipts tax to fund it, but the Illinois House voted unanimously against the tax in May 2007.

Later in 2007, Blagojevich tried again, issuing an emergency order that would have loosened the rules for eligibility under the state FamilyCare program, giving health insurance benefits to an additional 717,000 people. To pay for this plan, Blagojevich used his line item veto to remove US$500 million from the state budget. He avoided cutting spending from districts represented by the twelve members of the Joint Committee on Administrative Rules (JCAR), which had the power to block the rule. However, JCAR voted to block the emergency order anyway.

Blagojevich argued that JCAR's action blocking his emergency order was unconstitutional and proceeded with implementing the plan, but a Cook County judge blocked the plan in April 2008. Blagojevich's objection to JCAR's constitutionality later became one of the charges against him when he was impeached in 2009.

In 2008 Blagojevich proposed a scaled-back version, called Illinois Covered Choice, which would create a state-subsidized insurance pool. The program would have been paid for by a 3% increase in the state payroll tax. The General Assembly also rejected this proposal.

Blagojevich's successor, Pat Quinn, ultimately reached a compromise with the legislature in 2009 under which the state would expand subsidized health insurance coverage but to a lesser extent than under the Blagojevich plans. Quinn also settled litigation that would have brought the question of JCAR's constitutionality before the Illinois Supreme Court.

In 2009, following Blagojevich's impeachment and removal from office and in the midst of the debate over the federal Affordable Care Act, the Chicago weekly Newcity opined that in these healthcare reform initiatives, "our ex-governor was ahead of his time".

== Amendment and repeal ==
In 2010, state senator Dave Koehler proposed a bill that, as initially drafted, would have amended the HCJA to create a Health Care Justice Implementation Task Force that would monitor developments in federal health care law and recommend appropriate changes to Illinois health care law. The bill was approved 33–21 in the Senate and 76–41 in the House, but was killed by an amendatory veto by governor Pat Quinn, as the General Assembly neither adopted nor overrode the governor's changes before the end of the veto session.

After the federal Affordable Care Act was passed, the General Assembly repealed the HCJA and enacted the Illinois Health Care Benefits Exchange Law (215 ILCS 122), which became law on July 14, 2011, and established the Illinois Health Benefits Exchange.

== Legacy ==
During the Barack Obama 2008 presidential primary campaign, Obama's involvement in the HCJA became a source of controversy. A widely published Associated Press piece in January 2007 listed it among the "potentially explosive land mines" in his record as a state senator. In September 2007, the Boston Globe questioned whether Obama's work with insurance lobbyists to achieve a compromise on the HCJA undercut his attacks on the power of lobbyists in Washington and the Clinton campaign's lobbyist ties. Following the January 21, 2008 debate, the Clinton campaign cited the HCJA as evidence of the weakness of Obama's commitment to universal coverage.

Following Obama's election as president, the HCJA again attracted attention as an indicator of Obama's approach. During the discussion over national healthcare reform in 2009, PolitiFact rated the changes in Obama's position on single-payer healthcare since a pro-HCJA speech in 2003 a "Half Flip", in view of conflicting statements from Illinois single-payer advocates Jim Duffett and Quentin Young over whether Obama had ever directly advocated for single-payer or had always had a more nuanced approach.

== See also ==
- The Hospital Uninsured Patient Discount Act
