= ACAP =

ACAP may refer to:

== Conservation ==
- Agreement on the Conservation of Albatrosses and Petrels, a legally binding international treaty signed in 2001
- Arctic Council Action Plan, an action plan to eliminate pollution in the Arctic
- Annapurna Conservation Area Project, restricted area in Himalayas mountains, Nepal

== Technology ==
- Advanced Common Application Platform, a platform intended to provide television consumers with advanced interactive services
- Application Configuration Access Protocol, a protocol which enhances IMAP by allowing the user to set up data for universal access
- Automated Content Access Protocol, a proposed method of providing machine-readable DRM for online content

== Other fields ==
- Absorptive capacity, a term used within innovation management
- Advance Credit Administration Program, a series of college equivalent courses
- American Council on Alcohol Problems, a federation of 37 state affiliates promoting the reduction of alcohol advertising
- Association for Community Affiliated Plans, a Medicaid health plan trade association
- Australian College of Applied Psychology, a training organisation
