= Open enrollment =

Open enrollment may refer to:

- Annual enrollment, a period of starting insurance in the United States
- Open admissions, a college admissions policy in the United States
- Inter-district enrollment, a form of school choice in various countries
