= Arkansas Health Connector =

Health insurance marketplace

Agency overview
- Jurisdiction: Health insurance marketplace for U.S. state of Arkansas

Arkansas Health Connector/Arkansas Private option is the health insurance marketplace, previously known as health insurance exchange, in the U.S. state of Arkansas, created in accordance with the Patient Protection and Affordable Care Act. The marketplace operates a web site and a toll-free resource center.

== Description ==
The marketplace is offered to individuals and families who are not covered by their employer. It allows enrollees to compare health insurance plans and provides those who qualify with access to tax credits. Enrollment started on October 1, 2013.

The Arkansas Exchange will be run as a State-Federal partnership where the state will be responsible for the disseminating information regarding the marketplace. Actual enrollment of consumers in Arkansas will be handled by the Federally Facilitated Marketplace at HealthCare.gov.

As of December 2013, the state of Arkansas has received over 53 million dollars for operation of the site.

== Participating Insurance Providers ==
In 2014, 3 insurance providers will be participating in the state of Arkansas

- Ambetter of Arkansas
- Arkansas Blue Cross Blue Shield
- QualChoice Health Insurance
