= Hawaii Health Connector =

Health insurance marketplace

Agency overview
- Jurisdiction: Health insurance marketplace for U.S. state of Hawaii
- Agency executive: Tom Matsuda, interim executive director
- Website: hawaiihealthconnector.com

Hawaii Health Connector (or Hawaiʻi Health Connector) was the health insurance marketplace, previously known as health insurance exchange, in the U.S. state of Hawaii, created in 2013 in accordance with the Patient Protection and Affordable Care Act. It was located in Honolulu. The marketplace operated a toll-free call center and offered 95 different health plans.

After widespread difficulties, including technical problems that plagued the system from its start, in June 2015 the State of Hawaii announced that the Hawaii Connector would close.

== Overview ==
The cartel was a resource for families and small business to compare and to enroll in a health insurance plans offered. It also provided those enrolled with access to tax credits.

There were four basic plans available for Hawaii citizens, all with varying levels of coverage: Bronze (60 percent), Silver (70 percent), Gold (80 percent), and Platinum (90 percent). Plans with a lower percentage had lower premiums, and higher costs to the individual. A catastrophic plan was available and designed for younger individuals (under the age of 30) and these plans had a high deductible.

The connector had call representatives available who could speak and translate multiple languages, including English, Hawaiian, Japanese, Vietnamese, Ilocano, Korean, Tagalog, Marshallese, Cantonese, and Chuukese.

== History ==
=== Open enrollment for 2014 ===
The Connector's website was developed by CGI Group under a $53 million contract.

Enrollment was scheduled to start on October 1, 2013, but due to delays the site did not become operational until October 15. 41% of customers who tried to enroll gave up. There were 35 companies offering plans in 2014

Hawaii Health Connector executive director Coral Andrews resigned, effective December 6, 2013.

As of December 28, 2013, Hawaii Health Connector had enrolled 2,192 people in health plans, fewer than in any other state.

=== Open enrollment for 2015 ===
In 2015 a new executive director, Jeff Kissel, took over management of Hawaii Health Connector, and a consulting company Turning Point was hired.

For enrollment for 2015 which started on November 15, 2014, only 2% of enrollees gave up. Wait time to speak to a representative were reported to be 20 seconds. 22 additional insurance companies offered plans on the exchange. Complaints by customers are handled by personal calls from the executive director.

=== Closure ===
On June 5, 2015, the Connector's executive board voted to accept a state proposal, delivered in May by Governor David Ige's office, to close up the state system and switch to the federal HealthCare.gov platform by October 2015. The approximately 32,000 Hawaii residents currently enrolled must re-enroll to retain coverage in 2016.

Enrollment for small businesses is to end by June 15, 2015, and for individuals by September 30. By October 15 all those enrolled are expected to be transitioned to the federal system. Layoffs for the Connector's 33 employees will start on July 1, with the majority of the Connector's staff to be let go by January 1, 2016, and all positions eliminated by May 1, 2016.
