= Connect for Health Colorado =

Colorado's health insurance marketplace

Agency overview
- Jurisdiction: Health insurance marketplace for U.S. state of Colorado
- Website: connectforhealthco.com

Connect for Health Colorado is the health insurance marketplace, previously known as health insurance exchange, in the U.S. state of Colorado, created in accordance with the Patient Protection and Affordable Care Act. It is located in Denver. The marketplace operates a toll-free call center and, as of 2024, offers health plans from 6 insurance companies.

The marketplace is a resource for families and small business to compare and enroll in health insurance plans offered. It also provides enrollees with access to tax credits. Enrollment started on October 1, 2013. It is estimated that there are currently 700,000 medically uninsured individuals living in Colorado, and the marketplace hopes to sign up 125–140,000 individuals in the first year.

On October 22, 2013, the local CBS affiliate reported that Colorado's marketplace has had a relatively smooth rollout and that 3,000 families and individuals had already enrolled. There are 150 health plans to choose from and an ability to offload choices into an Excel spreadsheet. However, this report is only in comparison to the significantly worse off federal run plans. The website is just as metered in crashes, glitches and technical issues as most other state run health exchanges.

Patty Fontneau, the president and CEO of Connect for Health Colorado from its inception, announced in July 2014 that she would leave Connect for Health after 2 1/2 years to lead the private exchange market at one of Colorado's largest insurers, Cigna.
