= MNsure =

State health insurance marketplace for Minnesota

Agency overview
- Formed: March 21, 2013
- Jurisdiction: Minnesota
- Headquarters: Saint Paul, Minnesota
- Website: www.mnsure.org

MNsure is the health insurance marketplace for the U.S. state of Minnesota. The exchange enables people and small businesses to purchase health insurance at federally subsidized rates. The current CEO is Libby Caulum.

== Background ==
Health insurance exchanges were established as a part of the 2010 Patient Protection and Affordable Care Act to enable individuals to purchase health insurance in state-run marketplaces. In this legislation, states could choose to establish their own health insurance exchanges; if they choose not to do so, the federal government would run one for the state.

== History ==
On March 18, 2013, the Minnesota Legislature passed the Minnesota Insurance Marketplace Act establishing Minnesota's health insurance marketplace. It was signed by Governor Mark Dayton two days later on March 20 in a signing ceremony.
