= Covered California =

Health insurance marketplace in California, U.S.

Agency overview
- Jurisdiction: Health insurance marketplace for U.S. state of California
- Agency executive: Jessica Altman, Executive Director
- Website: coveredca.com

Covered California is the health insurance marketplace in the U.S. state of California established under the federal Patient Protection and Affordable Care Act (ACA). The exchange enables eligible individuals and small businesses to purchase private health insurance coverage at federally subsidized rates. It is administered by an independent agency of the government of California.

== History ==
California Governor Gavin Newsom and Chief of Staff Ann O'Leary in a public service announcement about Covered California in 2019.

California was the first state in the U.S. to set up a health insurance marketplace. The California Health Benefit Exchange was created in September 2010 when then-governor Arnold Schwarzenegger signed Assembly Bill 1602, (the "California Patient Protection and Affordable Care Act"), by Assembly Speaker John Perez, and Senate Bill 900, by State Senator Elaine Alquist, into law. Organizations such as the California Taxpayers Association and California Chamber of Commerce and Anthem Blue Cross had opposed the bills in whole or in part, but Schwarzenegger had made Obamacare in California a priority.

The program was named "Covered California" in October 2012. Efforts to educate potential enrollees about Covered California began in 2013, including $37 million in grants to 48 organizations. Enrollment started on October 1, 2013; during the first month of operation, 35,364 people enrolled in health plans offered through Covered California, more than were enrolled through the website for the federal exchange (HealthCare.gov) in the same period. As of November 2013, over 360,000 people had completed applications.

By the close of the first open enrollment period in April 2014, the number of people enrolled in Covered California was about 1.4 million; furthermore, another 1.1 million had signed up for Medi-Cal (California's Medicaid program, which was expanded as part of the ACA) through the Covered California web portal. In the second open enrollment period beginning in November 2014, Covered California's goal was to enroll 500,000 more people. The California Medical Association and other professional organizations pledged to work with Covered California to promote enrollments. Furthermore, the United States Department of Homeland Security and immigrant rights groups tried to assure potential applicants that any personal information disclosed to Covered California would not be shared with U.S. Immigration and Customs Enforcement.

There were 474,000 potential new enrollees by the end of the second regular open enrollment period in February 2015. It was announced that a special enrollment period would be held between February 2015 and April 2015 to reduce tax penalties in 2015 for 600,000 Californians who needed to pay a tax penalty in 2014 because they were uninsured.

== Coverage ==
=== Coverage levels ===
There are four options. Each will determine how much a consumer will pay.

- Bronze level: On average, the health plan pays 60% of covered health-care costs; the consumer pays 40%.
- Silver level: On average, the health plan pays 70% of covered health-care costs; the consumer pays 30%.
- Gold level: On average, the health plan pays 80% of covered health-care costs; the consumer pays 20%.
- Platinum level: On average, the health plan pays 90% of covered health-care costs; the consumer pays 10%.
- Minimum coverage plan (worst-case scenario): If the consumer is under 30 and cannot afford the other plans, this is another option. It covers three visits with no out-of-pocket costs and free preventative benefits. The services will cost full price until the consumer spends $8,150. At that point, the services are covered completely by the health plan.

=== Essential health benefits ===
Since Covered California is a part of the Affordable Care Act, there are some essential health benefits that the insurance companies must offer to consumers. This is a list of a few services:

- Ambulatory services
- Emergency/urgent care
- Hospital care services
- Maternity and newborn care
- Mental health and substance abuse services
- Prescription medication
- Rehabilitation services
- Laboratory services
- Preventative and wellness care
- Pediatric services

=== Dental care ===
This is not required in the health plan. All Covered California health insurance plans provide pediatric dental care. Adults have the option of choosing supplemental dental care services in their plan.

=== Vision care ===
This is not required in the health plan. Covered California provides vision care for children, but does not offer any for adults. However, Covered California will work with certain companies to offer vision care directly to the adults.

== Governance, staff, and budget ==
Covered California is governed by a board composed of five members: the Secretary of the California Health and Human Services Agency or their designee as a voting, ex officio member; two members appointed by the Governor; one member appointed by the Senate Committee on Rules; and one member appointed by the Speaker of the Assembly. All board members serve four-year terms.

The first and current permanent executive director is Peter V. Lee. The current board includes CA HHS Secretary Dr. Mark Ghaly, chair, and Paul Fearer, Jerry Fleming, Dr. Sandra Hernandez, and Art Torres.

The staff consists of 1,230 authorized positions in fiscal year 2014–15. Covered California receives no funding from state taxes; as of January 2014, it had received $1.1 billion in federal funds, but needed to be self-supporting by January 2015. The estimated expenditures for personnel in fiscal year 2014-15 were $108 million. It is projected that in fiscal year 2015, that Covered California will have a multimillion-dollar deficit.

The fiscal year 2015-2016 was the last year that Covered California used federal establishment funds. The government extended funding for that year and gave approximately $100 million. After that year, Covered California has gradually reduced expenses to save their funds. In 2015, it proposed a budget of $332.9 million, leaving $194 million in reserve funding. The actual budget adopted was approximately $335 million. In 2016, the proposed budget was $308 million, which was $28 million less than the year before. The actual budget adopted was $320.9 million. For the fiscal year of 2017–2018, the proposed budget is $313.9 million.

== Active purchasing ==
Covered California is unique among ACA marketplaces in actively using its "active purchasing" negotiating power to bargain for lower premiums, standardize benefit designs, and require improvements in quality and equity. This is in contrast with many other state exchanges without "selective contracting" ability, which must offer all qualifying products offered by insurers. Of particular notice to consumers, the standardized benefits reduce complexity and consumer confusion, allow for apples-to-apples comparisons for consumers, and encourage head-to-head price competition to lower premiums.

== Participating insurance providers ==
As of 2024, 12 insurance companies are participating in the individual and family exchange:

- Aetna
- Anthem Blue Cross
- Blue Shield of California
- Chinese Community Health Plan
- Health Net
- Inland Empire Health Plan
- Kaiser Permanente
- L.A. Care Health Plan
- Molina Healthcare
- Sharp Health Plan
- Valley Health Plan (part of the Santa Clara County Health System)
- Western Health Advantage (partnership of Dignity Health Sacramento and NorthBay Healthcare)

== Impact ==
=== Uninsured Rate ===
As of 2015 the uninsured rate in California was 8.1 percent, a 9.1 percent decrease from the rate prior to the implementation of the Affordable Care Act. Of the 5.4 million Californians who gained health insurance coverage during this period, 1.4 million received coverage through Covered California, and 4.1 million received coverage from the expansion of Medi-Cal. The number of individuals covered through the exchange has not increased significantly from the 1.4 million who enrolled during Covered California's first open enrollment period in 2014. During later open enrollment periods, as some individuals chose plans through the exchange, others become eligible for Medi-Cal coverage or received coverage through an employer. A 2014 analysis estimated that "between 1.1 and 1.3 million people will be enrolled in Covered California with subsidies at any point in time" due to the churn rate.

=== Disparities in Access ===
As of 2017, 11 insurance companies offer plans through Covered California, however depending on the county in which an individual lives, the number of insurers can vary from two to seven. A 2015 California Healthcare Foundation study found that the number of hospitals in an insurance network did not significantly affect the quality of care patients received. A study in the journal Health Affairs indicated that while hospital networks sold on the marketplace are narrower than their commercial counterparts, geographic access is similar, and the quality of care may even be better. However, a lack of healthcare provider options may weaken the leverage of insurance companies when negotiating prices, leading to higher premiums.

== Controversy ==
In April 2025, an investigation by The Markup revealed that the Covered California website contained trackers that sent sensitive personal data that users entered on the website, including whether a user was blind, pregnant, transgender, or a possible victim of domestic abuse, to LinkedIn for over a year as part of a marketing campaign.

== Links ==
- Official website
