= Joseph Zubretsky =

American health insurance executive

Joseph Zubretsky (born 1956 or 1957) is a businessman in health insurance, who is the CEO of Molina Healthcare. In the past he has worked for Aetna and Hanover Insurance.

== Career ==
Zubretsky graduated from the Barney School of Business at the University of Hartford. He began his career as an insurance partner at Coopers & Lybrand. He went on to hold positions of "senior VP at Unum, a partner in Brera Capital Partners, and an executive VP of business development at MassMutual Financial Group". He has also held positions at GAB Robins,.

Zubretsky worked at Aetna for nine years, for part of that time as "CEO of Aetna’s Healthagen Holdings subsidiary". While at Aetna, Zubretsky increased telecommuting for employees as a way to save on office and real estate costs.

Zubretsky was the president and chief executive officer of Hanover Insurance from June 2016 until October 2017, where he oversaw an overhaul of Hanover's organizational structure that merged "the company's small commercial, middle market and personal lines business into one division called Hanover Agency Markets", resulting in at least 160 cut jobs.

He resigned from Hanover in October 2017, when he became chief executive and president of Molina Healthcare. In 2024, Molina Healthcare announced that Zubretsky's tenure as CEO had been secured and that he would work 2027, and that Zubretsky had been "awarded a special one-time stock grant".

In 2021, Modern Healthcare rated Zubretsky 67th in its list of the 100 Most Influential in Healthcare.

In 2021, Zubretsky was paid $17,812,327 as CEO of Molina Healthcare. In 2022, Zubretsky's total compensation from Molina Healthcare was $180.8 million. In 2023, Zubretsky's total compensation was $21,491,723.
