= Margarethe Lyman Dwight =

American philanthropist

- Born: November 8, 1871; Berlin, Germany
- Died: June 22, 1962 (aged 90); Providence, Rhode Island, U.S.
- Occupations: Suffragist, philanthropist
- Relatives: Edward Carrington (great-grandfather); Thomas Wilson Dorr (great-uncle)

Margarethe Lyman Carrington Dwight (November 8, 1871 – June 22, 1962), known as "Daisy", was an American suffragist and philanthropist who volunteered for various charitable endeavors. She was born in Germany to American parents and lived in Rhode Island.

== Early life and education ==
Dwight was born in Berlin, the daughter of American parents Gamaliel Lyman Dwight and Ann Ives Carrington Dwight (died 1904). Her father was a physician and a Union Army veteran of the American Civil War. He died in the Bahamas when Dwight was three years old, and her mother remarried in 1882, to William Ames, who served in the Rhode Island legislature.

Dwight's great-grandfather Edward Carrington was an American diplomat in China. Reformer Thomas Wilson Dorr was her great-uncle. She attended the Quaker girls' school her mother founded, Lincoln School in Providence, Rhode Island.

== Career ==
Dwight volunteered at a military hospital in Rhode Island during the Spanish-American War. She became active in the women's suffrage movement in Rhode Island, mostly working on fundraising events. She was active in the Rhode Island League of Women Voters after 1920.

For 45 years, Dwight was secretary of the Providence Female Charitable Society, the oldest organization of its kind in the United States. Her mother and grandmother were active in the Society before her. She made visits to the needy residents of Providence, and was known as "the Angel of the East Side" for her work.

She also chaired the Rhode Island Conference of Baptist Youth, and served on the council of the Rhode Island Association for the Blind. She remained active at the Lincoln School as a trustee, dining with the students on campus and providing gifts for the girls. She was a member of the Daughters of the American Revolution.

Dwight donated land to the city for the creation of a school garden, and donated buildings for the use of charitable organizations. She donated her own family's home to the Rhode Island School of Design in 1956, and she donated Dorr Mansion to the Providence Preservation Society. She also made major donations from her family's papers, art collections and libraries to museums, libraries, and schools in Providence, including Brown University and the Rhode Island Historical Society. She supported the New Thought movement in New England, and led devotional services at the 1935 conference of the New England Federation of New Thought Centers.

== Personal life and legacy ==
Dwight died in 1962, at the age of 90, in Providence. The Margarethe Dwight House on the campus of Lincoln School is named in her memory, and was restored after 2001.
