= Christine C. Ferguson =

Christine C. Ferguson is the director of the HealthSource RI, and a professor at George Washington University. She was Commissioner of Public health in Massachusetts.
