= Nevada Health Link =

American health insurance marketplace

Agency overview
- Jurisdiction: Health insurance marketplace for U.S. state of Nevada
- Website: www.nevadahealthlink.com

Nevada Health Link is the health insurance marketplace for the U.S. state of Nevada. The exchange enables individuals and small businesses to purchase health insurance at federally subsidized rates.

== Background ==
Health insurance exchanges were established as a part of the 2010 Patient Protection and Affordable Care Act to enable individuals to purchase health insurance in state-run marketplaces. In this legislation, states could choose to establish their own health insurance exchanges; if they choose not to do so, the federal government would run the exchange for the state.
