= New Mexico Health Insurance Exchange =

US health insurance organization

Agency overview
- Jurisdiction: Health insurance marketplace for U.S. state of New Mexico
- Website: BeWellNM

New Mexico Health Insurance Exchange, otherwise known as BeWellNM, is the health insurance marketplace for the U.S. state of New Mexico. The exchange enables people and small businesses to purchase health insurance at federally subsidized rates.

On Jan 15, 2015 Mike English reported on Albuquerque Business First more than 40,000 health insurance signups.

== Background ==
Health insurance exchanges were established as a part of the 2010 Patient Protection and Affordable Care Act to enable individuals to purchase health insurance in state-run marketplaces. In this legislation, states could choose to establish their own health insurance exchanges; if they choose not to do so, the federal government would run one for the state.

In 2014, actual enrollment for New Mexico took place on Healthcare.gov
