= Kynect =

Health insurance marketplace for Kentucky, U.S.

kynect
Agency overview
- Jurisdiction: Health insurance marketplace for U.S. state of Kentucky
- Website: kynect.ky.gov

kynect, formerly and also called the Kentucky Health Benefit Exchange, is the health insurance marketplace, previously known as health insurance exchange, in the U.S. Commonwealth of Kentucky, created by then-Governor Steve Beshear in accordance with the Patient Protection and Affordable Care Act. Steve Beshear's successor as governor, Matt Bevin, ended Kynect enrollment for individuals as of 2017. From 2017 to 2020, the marketplace operated a web site for small business owners. Bevin's successor, Andy Beshear, announced on June 17, 2020, that Kentucky will reestablish a state health insurance marketplace similar to kynect, with full implementation by January 1, 2022. Kynect was officially relaunched on October 5, 2020, with full implementation in January 2022.

== Purpose ==
The marketplace was offered to individuals and families who are not covered by their employer, allowing enrollees to compare health insurance plans and provides those who qualify with access to tax credits. Enrollment started on October 1, 2013, and the first enrollment period ended March 31, 2014.

== Enrollment ==
137,000 individuals were reported using the website on the first four days of operation. The New York Times reported that Kentucky was "far ahead of most in signing up people" at the end of October, the first month of enrollment. By April 15, 2014, over 410,000 Kentuckians had signed up for health care plans through kynect.

=== Relaunch ===
Kynect was officially relaunched on October 5, 2020. At that time, the website allows residents to apply for programs available on the former Kentucky Benefind website, which was launched after the original kynect website was deactivated in 2017 and itself was deactivated and linked to the new kynect after its relaunch. These services include enrollment in Medicaid, the Kentucky Children’s Health Insurance Program (KCHIP) and the Kentucky Integrated Health Insurance Premium Payment program. In addition, qualified families can now also access SNAP food assistance benefits along with other family and childcare assistance programs. Kynect, like Benefind, linked to the federally run health insurance marketplace (healthcare.gov) until open enrollment in 2021. At that time, the state returned to a state run health insurance marketplace through kynect in time for policies to take effect in January 2022.

== Participating insurance providers at the time of the 2017 shutdown ==
- Anthem
- Blue Grass Family Health
- CareSource
- Humana
- Kentucky Health Cooperative
- UnitedHealthcare
- WellCare
