= Cover Oregon =

U.S. health insurance marketplace

Agency overview
- Formed: October 1, 2012
- Dissolved: March 6, 2015
- Jurisdiction: Health insurance marketplace for U.S. state of Oregon
- Agency executive: Aaron Patnode, Executive Director
- Website: www.coveroregon.com

Cover Oregon was the health insurance marketplace for the U.S. state of Oregon, established as Oregon's implementation of the Patient Protection and Affordable Care Act. Cover Oregon was intended to enable Oregonians and small businesses to purchase health insurance at federally subsidized rates.

While the intent was to allow registration and selection of coverage via a website, the site was plagued with problems, and it was possible to purchase insurance only by paper registration. As of January 2014, almost $200 million of the $300 million allocated to develop and operate the Cover Oregon website had been spent.

As a result of the ongoing problems, in April 2014, the board of directors voted to close the state-run exchange and adopt the Federal HealthCare.gov exchange beginning in 2015. The FBI began investigating the failed development of the website in March 2014.

In March 2015, the state officially abolished Cover Oregon, permanently folding its functions into an existing state agency and the federal HealthCare.gov website.

== Background ==
Health insurance exchanges were established as a part of the 2010 Patient Protection and Affordable Care Act to enable individuals to purchase health insurance in state-run marketplaces. In this legislation, states could choose to establish their own health insurance exchanges; if they choose not to do so, the federal government would run one for the state.

In 2011, the Oregon Legislative Assembly passed Senate Bill 99, establishing Oregon's own exchange. Rocky King was named executive director of the exchange in late 2011, and on October 1, 2012, the exchange was named Cover Oregon.

== Website failure ==
Development of the website that would process online enrollments was done by Oracle Corporation and managed by the state of Oregon rather than an independent systems integrator. The project was plagued by numerous management and technological issues, and though the website was supposed to begin processing enrollments on October 1, by mid-October, it was unable to process any enrollments. As of mid-December 2013, the deadline for enrollment for coverage beginning January 1, the state had spent nearly $160 million and the site still could not process online enrollments. Governor John Kitzhaber informed Oregon residents that they should obtain a paper application and mail it in to obtain coverage. The state hired or reassigned nearly 500 people to process paper applications.

As of April 2014, the website was still not accepting online enrollments. 200,000 people had enrolled in Cover Oregon via paper applications, the majority through the Oregon Health Plan (Oregon's implementation of Medicaid). Cover Oregon Executive Director Rocky King and Oregon Health Authority chief information officer Carolyn Lawson both resigned in the wake of the failure of the website. Interim executive director Bruce Goldberg stepped down in April 2014 and was replaced by Clyde Hamstreet, a consultant who specializes in corporate turnarounds.

Faced with millions to make Cover Oregon functional, the board of directors voted in April 2014 to scrap the website in favor of adopting the Federal HealthCare.gov website for 2015 enrollments. Existing subscribers will have to re-enroll with the Federal exchange.

=== Legal disputes ===
In August 2014, Oracle Corporation sued Cover Oregon for breach of contract, for allegedly using their software without paying and then later that month the state of Oregon sued Oracle Corporation, in a civil complaint for breach of contract and "racketeering". By September 8, 2014, Oracle America had filed an amended complaint in federal court accusing Oregon of copyright infringement as Oregon was alleged to be using and distributing unpaid-for works derived from Oracle America's software.

In March 2015, Oregon Governor Kate Brown signed legislation dissolving Cover Oregon.

The parties came to a settlement in September 2016, in which Oregon accepted a package that included $35 million in cash payments from Oracle, and technical support and software licensing agreements with an estimated value of $60 million. Although only a portion of the $240 million spent by the state to develop the system was recouped, a significant part of that expenditure was provided by the federal government, which would likely have claimed additional cash settlement would likely have been claimed.

"We are pleased to have this contentious litigation behind us and to provide Oregon with the flexibility to obtain the software and technical support it desires to address the state's needs over the next several years," said Dorian Daley, Oracle's executive vice president and general counsel.

The Portland Tribune criticized the settlement: "But when the details are examined, it's clear Oracle came out the clear winner in these negotiations, while Oregon receives very little beyond its legal costs."

=== Federal investigation ===
In March 2014, the FBI announced it was launching an investigation into possible criminal wrongdoing related to the failed development of the site. Subpoenas were issued in May 2014 by a grand jury. As of May 2016 the FBI investigation into Cover Oregon was on-going.

== Participating insurance providers ==
In 2014, 11 insurers offered plans on the individual/family market through Cover Oregon.

- ATRIO Health
- Bridgespan
- Health Net
- Health Republic
- Kaiser Permanente
- Lifewise
- Moda Health
- Oregon's Health Co-Op (since closed)
- PacificSource
- Providence Health Plan
- Trillium Community Health Plan
