= Maryland Health Connection =

Health insurance marketplace

Agency overview
- Formed: October 1, 2013; 13 years ago
- Jurisdiction: Health insurance marketplace for U.S. state of Maryland
- Agency executive: Michele Eberle, executive director
- Website: marylandhealthconnection.gov/

The Maryland Health Connection (administered by the Maryland Health Benefit Exchange) is the health insurance marketplace in the U.S. state of Maryland, created in accordance with the Patient Protection and Affordable Care Act.

The marketplace is offered to individuals and families who are not covered through their employers. It allows enrollees to compare health insurance plans and provides those who qualify with access to tax credits. It also provides access to Medicaid enrollment for low-income Marylanders. Enrollment started on October 1, 2013. As of the 2019 calendar year, 156,963 people were enrolled in private health plans, 39,720 people were enrolled in stand-alone dental plans, and 1,076,175 people were enrolled in Medicaid through Maryland Health Connection.

Maryland Health Connection opened two emergency special enrollment periods for Marylanders who needed health insurance during the COVID-19 pandemic in the United States. Maryland had the longest special enrollment period of all U.S. states in 2020. The first special enrollment period ran from March 16, 2020, until July 15, 2020, and more than 54,000 people enrolled in health coverage. The second special enrollment period was announced on August 7, 2020, and is intended to run until December 15, 2020.

== Staff ==
Michele S. Eberle has been the executive director of the Maryland Health Benefit Exchange since 2017. Eberle was previously the exchange's chief operating officer since 2015.
