= Illinois Health Benefits Exchange =

U.S. state insurance marketplace

Agency overview
- Jurisdiction: Health insurance marketplace for U.S. state of Illinois
- Website: getcovered.illinois.gov

Get Covered Illinois is the health insurance marketplace for the U.S. state of Illinois. The exchange enables people and small businesses to purchase health insurance at federally subsidized rates. Since its inception, over 388,179 Illinois consumers have gained health insurance coverage.

== Background ==
Health insurance exchanges were established as a part of the 2010 Patient Protection and Affordable Care Act to enable individuals to purchase health insurance in state-run marketplaces. In this legislation, states could choose to establish their own health insurance exchanges; if they choose not to do so, the federal government would run one for the state.

== Small business ==
On October 27, 2014, the Illinois online small business marketplace (SHOP) was launched. This exchange facilitates the use of Small Business Health Care tax credits.
