= HealthSource RI =

Health insurance marketplace for Rhode Island, USA

Agency overview
- Jurisdiction: Health insurance marketplace for U.S. state of Rhode Island
- Agency executive: Lindsay M. Lang, director
- Website: www.healthsourceri.com

HealthSource RI is the health insurance marketplace for the U.S. state of Rhode Island. The marketplace enables people and small businesses to purchase health insurance, many at federally subsidized rates. The marketplace's web site also allows people to sign up for Medicaid, a federal and state program that helps with healthcare costs for some people with limited income and resources.

As of February 8, 2014, 16,512 people had signed up for private health insurance through HealthSource RI, and 107 small businesses had enrolled 658 employees and dependents. An additional 35,821 people had signed up for Medicaid.

On February 4, 2015, Richard Salit of the Providence Journal wrote that 27,000 2014 enrollees may owe money to the IRS because they may have received too large of a subsidy.

== Background ==
Health insurance exchanges were established as a part of the 2010 Patient Protection and Affordable Care Act to enable individuals and businesses to purchase health insurance in state-run marketplaces. Under this legislation, states could choose to establish their own health insurance exchanges; if they chose not to do so, the federal government runs one for the state.
