= Campaign for Better Health Care =

American-based coalition of healthcare advocates

Campaign For Better Health Care
- Founded: 1989
- Founders: Jim Duffett
- Type: Nonprofit coalition
- Location(s): 44 E. Main Street Suite 414 Champaign, IL 61820 1325 S. Wabash Avenue, Suite 305, Chicago, IL 60605
- Region served: Illinois

The Campaign for Better Health Care (CBHC) is a coalition of healthcare advocates, labor unions, and nonprofit organizations working to bring a single-payer healthcare system to the United States. Based in Illinois, it was founded by Jim Duffet in 1989.

== History ==
In 1988, a handful of downstate community organizations (Danville Area Community Services Council and the Champaign County Health Care Consumers) and statewide grassroots health care organizations (Illinois Alliance for Retired Americans, then Illinois State Council of Senior Citizens; Illinois Citizen Action, then Illinois Public Action Council; and the Coalition for Consumer Rights) established the Campaign for Better Health Care to provide a central statewide grassroots health care reform organization.

The Health Care Justice Act, which was sponsored by Barack Obama in the Illinois State Senate, grew out of work done by the Campaign for Better Health Care. According to Edward McClelland, the Affordable Care Act finds its origin in this legislative battle.
