= Amida Care =

New York state health insurance plan

- Type: Non-profit
- Industry: Health insurance
- Founded: 2003
- Headquarters: New York
- Key people: Doug Wirth (President & CEO)

Amida Care is a New York State Medicaid managed care health plan for those with HIV/AIDS and other chronic conditions such as addiction, mental health issues, and homelessness.

== Overview ==
Amida Care is a New York Medicaid managed care health plan for those with HIV/AIDS and other chronic conditions such as addiction, mental health issues, and homelessness. The non-profit was founded in 2003. One of its focuses is on members of the LGBTQ community including transgender people. The organization operates in New York, and it is the largest Medicaid Special Needs Health Plan in the state. The president and CEO of the organization is Doug Wirth. In 2018 the company had about $400 million in revenues.

== Programs ==
The Live Life Plus health plan includes HIV prevention and risk reduction education, treatment adherence services, and multidisciplinary behavioral health services. Amida Care also provides care for individuals diagnosed with Hepatitis C. It works with local partners to provide care, both medical and non-medical, such as housing consultation. Amida Care works to identify and reach out to individuals who have stopped taking their HIV medication in order to aid in treatment. In 2017 Amida Care expanded the Live Life Plus health plan to enroll HIV-negative in addition to HIV-positive transgender individuals, due to the historical difficulty of transgender people in accessing healthcare. Amida Care also enrolls homeless individuals who are HIV-negative or HIV-positive.
