= Pennie =

Health insurance marketplace in Pennsylvania

Agency overview
- Jurisdiction: Health insurance marketplace for U.S. state of Pennsylvania
- Agency executive: Devon Trolley, Executive Director
- Website: agency.pennie.com

Pennie is the official health insurance marketplace in the U.S. state of Pennsylvania established under the federal Patient Protection and Affordable Care Act (ACA). The exchange enables eligible individuals to purchase private health insurance coverage at federally subsidized rates. Launched on September 22, 2020, it is administered by the Pennsylvania Health Insurance Exchange Authority (PHIEA), an independent agency of the government of Pennsylvania.
