= Risk corridor =

Health policy concept

A risk corridor is a provision in US healthcare legislation that aims to stabilize health insurance premiums by limiting the financial risks borne by insurance providers. Risk corridors are found in Medicare Part D and the Affordable Care Act (ACA). In the Medicare Part D prescription drug program, risk corridors were established to protect participating insurers from bearing an excessive amount of risk due to fluctuations in drug pricing. These risk corridors were intended to ensure that the program was financially viable for insurers, while also helping to keep premiums affordable for consumers.

Under the Medicare Part D risk corridor program, insurers were guaranteed that their costs would be offset if they incurred large losses due to higher-than-expected drug costs. If insurers' drug costs were lower than expected, however, they were required to pay a portion of the savings to the government. This system was designed to encourage insurers to participate in the program and to minimize the risk of high premiums or financial losses due to drug price volatility.

Risk corridors have been controversial. The ACA established risk corridors for the health insurance marketplaces, but the program faced significant funding shortfalls and was criticized, as a "bailout" for insurers. In 2014, Congress passed legislation that limited the federal government's ability to fund risk corridors.
