= NY State of Health =

Health insurance marketplace in the United States

Agency overview
- Formed: 12 April 2012
- Jurisdiction: Health insurance marketplace for U.S. state of New York
- Website: nystateofhealth.ny.gov

NY State of Health is the health insurance marketplace, previously known as health insurance exchange, in the U.S. state of New York, created in accordance with the Patient Protection and Affordable Care Act. The marketplace operates a website.

The marketplace is offered to individuals and families who are not covered by their employer. It allows enrollees to compare health insurance plans and provides those who qualify with access to tax credits. Enrollment started on October 1, 2013. It was created in April 2012.

During the first month of operation 16,404 people enrolled in health plans offered through New York's health insurance marketplace.

In February 2020, a Special Enrollment Period was opened to help cover people during the COVID-19 pandemic. Also in 2020, during the open enrollment period, the state announced that all New Yorkers enrolled in certain health plans through NYSOH would have their benefits automatically extended due to COVID-19.
