= Felivaru Fisheries =

Felivaru Fisheries Maldives (FFM) is a company owned by the government of Maldives. It produces canned tuna and cooked fish for local and export markets.

FFM catches tuna off the coast of the Maldives using the pole and line method. This method is certified as "dolphin friendly" by the Earth Island Institute. FFM claims that the pole and line method used in Maldivian fisheries is a sustainable and effective methods in getting the target species. The sustainability claim is supported by certification of skipjack tuna (Katsuwonus pelamis) by the Marine Stewardship Council.

== Products ==
- Canned Tuna
- Fresh Chilled and Tuna Products
