= Your Health Idaho =

US heatlh insurance organization

Agency overview
- Jurisdiction: Health insurance marketplace for U.S. state of Idaho
- Website: www.yourhealthidaho.org

Your Health Idaho, sometimes known as the Idaho Health Insurance Exchange, is the health insurance marketplace for the U.S. state of Idaho. The exchange enables people and small businesses to purchase health insurance at federally subsidized rates.

== Background ==
Health insurance exchanges were established as a part of the 2010 Patient Protection and Affordable Care Act to enable individuals to purchase health insurance in state-run marketplaces. In this legislation, states could choose to establish their own health insurance exchanges; if they choose not to do so, the federal government would run one for the state.

In 2014, Healthcare.gov was responsible for enrolling consumers in on-exchange health plans in the state of Idaho.
