= Annual enrollment =

Defined period in US health insurance

In the United States, annual enrollment (also known as open enrollment or open season) is a period of time, usually but not always occurring once per year, when employees of companies and organizations, including the government, may make changes to their elected employee benefit options, such as health insurance. The term also applies to the annual period during which individuals may buy individual health insurance plans through the online, state-based health insurance exchanges established by the Patient Protection and Affordable Care Act. Prior to January 1, 2014 insurers offering individual medical coverage typically allowed new members passing underwriting to enroll at any time throughout the year.

Annual enrollment is also prominent in Medicare, where almost 50 million enrollees can choose to stay in original Medicare, or join or change plans within the Medicare Advantage and Medicare Part D Prescription Drug programs for the coming calendar year, with enrollment usually occurring between October 15 and December 7 the previous year. Individuals usually can make changes to, or sign up for, their health insurance or fringe benefits only once per year during the annual enrollment period or when they have experienced a specific qualifying event. Open enrollment periods are used in insurance markets to limit adverse selection risks resulting when enrollees can switch plans at will.

During this time period, an employer will typically communicate to all eligible employees what options they have for their benefit program. Often the vendors or insurance providers will be present to explain the details of their products. This can be done either with group presentations, "benefit fairs" or meetings one on one with each employee. As travel expenses continue to rise many vendors and insurance providers have turned to using independent "contract enrollers" to do the communication on their behalf. Some companies and organizations distinguish between an active enrollment benefits election period, where employees must re-review or confirm their benefits selections for the coming year, and a passive enrollment benefits election period, where employees are automatically renewed with their existing benefits selections from the current year if no action is taken. For Medicare Part D enrollments, health care providers, along with Medicare itself, coordinate advertising campaigns during the open enrollment period, including paid programming presentations, to make consumers aware of their options. Some campaigns have proven controversial, making broad claims of benefits without clarifying properly who is eligible, and depending on paid endorsers such as celebrities and retired politicians to sell low-quality plans.

Open season is a prominent feature of the Federal Employees Health Benefits Program during which some three million federal civilian employees and retirees may choose among several dozen health insurance plans for the coming year. Open season is scheduled in the fall each year, and plan enrollment decisions take effect in the following calendar year.

== Under the Patient Protection and Affordable Care Act ==
Under the Patient Protection and Affordable Care Act, annual enrollment, or open enrollment, is the period that people in the United States who need health insurance can sign up for an individual insurance plan. Unless someone experiences a "qualifying event" (a change in personal circumstances such as getting married or having a baby) outside of the annual enrollment period, annual enrollment is the only time to sign up for individual health insurance under the Affordable Care Act. Annual enrollment used to last for three months; the 2016 cycle lasted from November 1, 2015 to January 31, 2016. The 2018 annual enrollment cycle was reduced to 45 days (in most states) from November 1, 2017 to December 15, 2017.

Acting during the annual enrollment period is vital for any individual who wishes to buy individual health insurance. During annual enrollment anyone who wants to purchase insurance through the public exchange has the opportunity to do so despite circumstances, such as health or age. Outside annual enrollment, it can be difficult to obtain insurance, either public or private unless circumstances dictate.

== See also ==
- Fiscal year
- Health care sharing ministry
