= Federally Facilitated Marketplace =

The Federally Facilitated Marketplace (FFM) is an organized marketplace for health insurance plans operated by the U.S. Department of Health and Human Services (HHS). The FFM opened for enrollments starting October 1, 2013. The Federally Facilitated Marketplace is established in a state by the HHS Secretary for states that chose not to set up their own marketplace or did not get approval for one.

Individuals (i.e. citizens of a state) and employers will have the ability to find and purchase Qualified Health Plans through the FFM and its partners. Individuals will be able to qualify for and receive Advance Premium Tax Credits (APTC) which can be used to subsidize their premium obligations. Individuals can also qualify for Cost Sharing Reductions (CSRs) which would reduce their out-of-pocket expenses for healthcare.

== Participating states ==
Twenty-two states opted to participate in the FFM. Three states opted to partner with the FFM. Nineteen states opted to set up their State-Based Marketplace (SBM).

=== Federally Facilitated Marketplaces ===
The following 23 states are Federally Facilitated Marketplaces:

1. Alabama
2. Alaska
3. Arizona
4. Florida
5. Indiana
6. Kansas
7. Louisiana
8. Maine
9. Mississippi
10. Missouri
11. Montana
12. Nebraska
13. North Carolina
14. North Dakota
15. Ohio
16. Oklahoma
17. South Carolina
18. South Dakota
19. Tennessee
20. Texas
21. Utah
22. Wisconsin
23. Wyoming

=== Partnership Marketplaces ===
The following 3 states are Partnership Marketplaces. In Partnership Marketplaces, states retain certain essential functionality for operating an insurance marketplace.

1. Arkansas
2. Georgia
3. Oregon

State-Based Marketplaces (SBM) Manage Marketplace functions, but rely on Healthcare.gov platform to manage their eligibility and enrollment functions. The following 19 states are SBMs:

1. California
2. Colorado
3. Connecticut
4. District of Columbia
5. Idaho
6. Kentucky
7. Maine
8. Maryland
9. Massachusetts
10. Minnesota
11. Nevada
12. New Jersey
13. New Mexico
14. New York
15. Pennsylvania
16. Rhode Island
17. Vermont
18. Virginia
19. Washington
