= CGI Group =

Israeli business Intelligence company

- Type: Private
- Founded: 1989; 37 years ago
- Founder: Zvika Nave
- Headquarters: Tel Aviv, Israel
- Key people: Jacob Perry
- Website: https://www.cgi.co.il/

CGI Group is a business intelligence and strategic consulting company based in Israel and established by Zvika Nave. It employs former Israeli intelligence professionals, and specializes in intelligence gathering, business planning, and security consulting both in Israel and internationally.

It received prominence when it was published it assisted in the Dresden Green Vault burglary, but subsequent reports in the Bild claimed it played no part in the resolution of that heist:

"Since 2019, the Israeli security firm CGI Group claimed to have been involved in solving spectacular robberies. First in the Green Vault in Dresden, most recently in the Louvre in Paris. BILD and many other media outlets reported on it. As further research has shown, none of this is most likely true. It seems as if the company came up with the alleged successes in order to advertise for free."

== Notable Investigations ==
=== 2019 Blue and White Party Hacking ===
CGI group was hired to investigate leaks to the media from within the Israeli political party Blue and White prior to the September 2019 Israeli legislative election. The company's report was leaked to news channels, and found that several phones associated with the campaign had been infected by eastern European malware. The party dismissed the report.

=== 2019 Dresden Green Vault burglary ===
After the Dresden Green Vault burglary, CGI reported being contacted by the thieves over the dark web. CGI took partial credit for the recovery of the artifacts, saying the intelligence it provided matched the arrests made by the German police.

=== 2025 Louvre robbery ===
The group was hired to identify and track down the perpetrators of the jewelry theft at the Louvre museum. The CEO cited successes at the Dresden Green Vault burglary as motivation to solicit the company's services.

== Controversies ==
The company has been accused of assisting in the parental abduction of German heiress Christina Block's children at her request, during a custody battle with her ex-husband. The allegations have been firmly denied.
