= Health insurance marketplace =

Health insurance marketplaces, also called health exchanges, are organizations in each state through which people can purchase health insurance.

In the United States, people can purchase health insurance that complies with the Patient Protection and Affordable Care Act (ACA, known colloquially as "Obamacare") at ACA health exchanges, where they can choose from a range of government-regulated and standardized health care plans offered by the insurers participating in the exchange. ACA health exchanges were fully certified and operational by January 1, 2014, under federal law. Enrollment in the marketplaces started on October 1, 2013, and continued for six months. As of April 19, 2014, 8.02 million people had signed up through the health insurance marketplaces. An additional 4.8 million joined Medicaid. Enrollment for 2015 began on November 15, 2014, and ended on December 15, 2014. As of April 14, 2020, 11.41 million people had signed up through the health insurance marketplaces.

Private non-ACA health care exchanges also exist in many states, responsible for enrolling 3 million people. These exchanges predate the Affordable Care Act and facilitate insurance plans for employees of small and medium size businesses.

== Background ==
Health insurance exchanges in the United States expand insurance coverage while allowing insurers to compete in cost-efficient ways and help them to comply with consumer protection laws. Exchanges are not themselves insurers, so they do not bear risk themselves, but they do determine which insurance companies participate in the exchange. An ideal exchange promotes insurance transparency and accountability, facilitates increased enrollment and delivery of subsidies, and helps spread risk to ensure that the costs associated with expensive medical treatments are shared more broadly across large groups of people, rather than spread across just a few beneficiaries. Health insurance exchanges use electronic data interchange (EDI) to transmit required information between the exchanges and carriers (trading partners), in particular the 834 transaction for enrollment information and the 820 transaction for premium payment.

== History ==
Health insurance exchanges by state. Creating state-operated exchanges Establishing state-federal partnership exchanges Defaulting to federal exchange

Health exchanges first emerged in the private sector in the early 1980s. They used computer networking to integrate claims management, eligibility verification, and inter-carrier payments. These became popular in some regions as a way for small and medium-sized businesses to pool their purchasing power into larger groups, reducing cost. An additional advantage was the ability of small businesses to offer a range of plans to employees, allowing them to compete with larger corporations. The largest such exchange prior to the ACA was CaliforniaChoice, established in 1996. By 2000, CaliforniaChoice's membership included 140,000 individuals from 9000 business groups.

Obamacare maintained the concept of health insurance exchanges as a key component of health care. President Obama stated that it should be "a market where Americans can one-stop shop for a health care plan, compare benefits and prices, and choose the plan that's best for them, in the same way that Members of Congress and their families can. None of these plans should deny coverage on the basis of a preexisting condition, and all of these plans should include an affordable basic benefit package that includes prevention, and protection against catastrophic costs. I strongly believe that Americans should have the choice of a public health insurance option operating alongside private plans. This will give them a better range of choices, make the health care market more competitive, and keep insurance companies honest." Although the House of Representatives had sought a single national exchange as well as a public option, the Patient Protection and Affordable Care Act (ACA) as passed used state-based exchanges, and the public option was ultimately dropped from the bill after it did not win filibuster-proof support in the Senate. States may choose to join together to run multi-state exchanges, or they may opt out of running their own exchange, in which case the federal government will step in to create an exchange for use by their citizens.

ACA was signed into law on March 23, 2010. The law required that health insurance exchanges commence operation in every state on October 1, 2013. In the first year of operation, open enrollment on the exchanges ran from October 1, 2013, to March 31, 2014, and insurance plans purchased by December 15, 2013, began coverage on January 1, 2014. For 2015 open enrollment began on November 15, 2014, and ended on February 15, 2015.

=== Initial launch ===
On the date the Patient Protection and Affordable Care Act of 2010 was enacted, only a few health insurance exchanges across the country were up and running. Among them were the Massachusetts Health Connector, the New York HealthPass - a non-profit exchange, and the Utah Health Exchange. Advocates claim these exchanges make these "markets" more efficient, providing oversight and structure, arguing that previous health insurance markets in the United States are poorly-organized and deal with wide variations in coverages and requirements among different companies, employers, and policies.

It was unknown how many people in total successfully enrolled in the first week. The federal marketplace website was scheduled for maintenance on the weekend.

CGI Group came under media scrutiny as a developer behind several marketplace websites, after numerous issues surfaced with the federal health insurance marketplace, HealthCare.gov.

On October 1, 2013, the state-run marketplaces also opened to the public, and some of them reported first statistics. During the first week of enrollment:

- 28,699 people enrolled in the California health plan marketplace
- 17,300 people enrolled in the Kentucky health plan marketplace
- More than 40,000 people enrolled in the NY State of Health marketplace
- On October 8, 2013, The Seattle Times reported that more than 9,400 people had enrolled in the Washington health plan marketplace. However, a later report clarified that many included in that count were Medicaid enrollees. By October 21, 2013, only 4,500 Washington residents had enrolled in private insurance through the state marketplace.

On October 23, 2013, The Washington Post reported that Americans with no health insurance would have an additional six weeks before they would be penalized. That deadline was extended to March 31, and those who do not enroll by then may still avoid incurring penalties and getting locked out of the healthcare enrollment system this year. Exemptions and extensions apply to:

- Those living in states that use federal exchange, who may avail themselves of a "special entrollment period" that allows individuals to avoid penalties and enroll in a health plan by checking a blue box by mid-April 2014, stating they tried to enroll before the deadline (doing so provides a yet-undetermined amount of time to actually sign up after that). The New York Post reports: "This method will rely on an honor system; the government will not try to determine whether the person is telling the truth". State-run exchanges have their own rules; several will be granting similar extensions.
- Members of the Pre-Existing Condition Insurance Program, who were given a one-month extension until the end of April 2014.
- Those who have successfully applied for exemption status based on criteria published by HealthCare.gov, who are not required to pay a tax penalty if they don't enroll in a health insurance plan.

A study by Avalere Health says that healthcare insurance premiums of popular plans available under Obamacare for 2015 rose by 3-4% .

According to the US Department of Health & Human Service, as enrollment for the Health Insurance Marketplace began on November 15, about 11.4 million people have explored their options, learned about the financial assistance available, and signed up for or renewed a health plan that meets their needs and fits their budget. As of February, 2015, $268 was the average monthly tax credit for people who qualify for financial assistance in 37 states using HealthcCare.gov through January 30.

== Impacts ==
Implementation of the individual exchanges changed the practice of insuring individuals. The expansion of this market was a major focus of ACA. Over 1.3 million people had selected plans for 2015 marketplace coverage in the first three weeks of the year's open enrollment period, including people who renewed their coverage and new customers.

As of January 3, 2014, 2 million people had selected a health plan through the health insurance marketplaces. By April 19, 2014, 8.0 million people had signed up through the health insurance marketplaces and an additional 4.8 million joined Medicaid. As of February, 2015, about 11.4 million people had signed up for or been automatically renewed for 2015 marketplace coverage. Today, more than 1,400 local outreach events have been conducted in federally facilitated marketplace states across the country.

== Regulations ==
- Insurers are prohibited from discriminating against or charging higher rates for any individual based on pre-existing medical conditions or gender.
- Insurers are prohibited from establishing annual spending caps of dollar amounts on essential health benefits.
- All private health insurance plans offered in the Marketplace must offer the following essential health benefits: ambulatory care, emergency services, hospitalization (such as surgery), maternity and newborn care, mental health and substance abuse services, prescription drugs, rehabilitative and habilitative services (services to help people with injuries, disabilities, or chronic conditions to recover), laboratory services, preventive and wellness services, and pediatric services.
- Under the individual mandate provision (sometimes called a "shared responsibility requirement" or "mandatory minimum coverage requirement"), individuals who are not covered by an acceptable health insurance policy will be charged an annual tax penalty of $95, or up to 1% of income over the filing minimum, whichever is greater; this will rise to a minimum of $695 ($2,085 for families), or 2.5% of income over the filing minimum, by 2016. The penalty is prorated, meaning that if a person or family has coverage for part of the year they won't be liable if they lack coverage for less than a three-month period during the year. Exemptions are permitted for religious reasons, for members of health care sharing ministries, or for those for whom the least expensive policy would exceed 8% of their income. Also exempted are U.S. citizens who qualify as residents of a foreign country under the IRS foreign earned income exclusion rule. In 2010, the Commissioner speculated that insurance providers would supply a form confirming essential coverage to both individuals and the IRS; individuals would attach this form to their Federal tax return. Those who aren't covered will be assessed the penalty on their Federal tax return. In the wording of the law, a taxpayer who fails to pay the penalty "shall not be subject to any criminal prosecution or penalty" and cannot have liens or levies placed on their property, but the IRS will be able to withhold future tax refunds from them.

United States Department of Health and Human Services (HHS) federal poverty level in 2013
Persons in Family Unit	48 Contiguous States and D.C.	Alaska	Hawaii
1	$11,490	$14,350	$13,230
2	$15,510	$19,380	$17,850
3	$19,530	$24,410	$22,470
4	$23,550	$29,440	$27,090
5	$27,570	$34,470	$31,710
6	$31,590	$39,500	$36,330
7	$35,610	$44,530	$40,950
8	$39,630	$49,560	$45,570
Each additional person adds	$4,020	$5,030	$4,620

- In participating states, Medicaid eligibility is expanded; all individuals with income up to 133% of the poverty line qualify for coverage, including adults without dependent children. The law also provides for a 5% "income disregard", making the effective income eligibility limit 138% of the poverty line. States may choose to increase the income eligibility limit beyond this minimum requirement. As written, the ACA withheld all Medicaid funding from states declining to participate in the expansion. However, the Supreme Court ruled in National Federation of Independent Business v. Sebelius (2012) that this withdrawal of funding was unconstitutionally coercive and that individual states had the right to opt out of the Medicaid expansion without losing pre-existing Medicaid funding from the federal government. For states that do expand Medicaid, the law provides that the federal government will pay for 100% of the expansion for the first three years, then gradually reduce its subsidy to 90% by 2020. As of April 25, 2013, fifteen states—Alaska, Alabama, Georgia, Idaho, Indiana, Iowa, Louisiana, Mississippi, Nebraska, North Carolina, Oklahoma, South Carolina, Texas, Wisconsin, and Virginia—were not participating in the Medicaid expansion, with ten more—Kansas, Maine, Michigan, Montana, Missouri, Ohio, Pennsylvania, South Dakota, Utah, and Wyoming—leaning towards not participating.
- The Patient Protection and Affordable Care Act eliminates lifetime and annual limits from plans in the individual health benefits exchanges. This effectively eliminates the ceiling on financial risk for individuals in the individual exchanges.

=== Limit to price variation ===
Pricing Factors Allowed in the exchange under the ACA:

- Age: 3:1
- Smoking status: 1.5:1

Pricing variation will be allowed by area (within a state) and family composition ("tier") as well.

=== Guaranteed issue ===
State and district exchanges
Arkansas Health Connector
Covered California
Connect for Health Colorado
Access Health CT (Connecticut)
DC Health Link (District of Columbia)
Hawaiʻi Health Connector
Get Covered Idaho
Get Covered Illinois
Kynect (Kentucky)
Maryland Health Connection
Massachusetts Health Connector
MNsure (Minnesota)
Nevada Health Link
BeWellNM (New Mexico)
NY State of Health (New York)
Cover Oregon
Pennie (Pennsylvania)
HealthSource RI (Rhode Island)
Vermont Health Connect
Washington Healthplanfinder

In the individual market, sometimes thought of as the "residual market" of insurance, insurers have generally used a process called underwriting to ensure that each individual paid for his or her actuarial value or to deny coverage altogether. The House Committee on Energy and Commerce found that, between 2007 and 2009, the four largest for-profit insurance companies refused insurance to 651,000 people for previous medical conditions, a number that increased significantly each year, with a 49% increase in that time period. The same memorandum said that 212,800 claims had been refused payment due to pre-existing conditions and that insurance firms had business plans to limit money paid based on these pre-existing conditions. These persons who might not have received insurance under previous industry practices are guaranteed insurance coverage under the ACA. Hence, the insurance exchanges will shift a greater amount of financial risk to the insurers, but will help to share the cost of that risk among a larger pool of insured individuals. The ACA's prohibition on denying coverage for pre-existing conditions began on January 1, 2014. Previously, several state and federal programs, including most recently the ACA, provided funds for state-run high-risk pools for those with previously existing conditions. Several states have continued their high-risk pools even after the first marketplace enrollment period.

== Economics of health insurance exchanges ==
The health insurance advocacy group America's Health Insurance Plans was willing to accept these constraints on pricing, capping, and enrollment because of the individual mandate: The individual mandate requires that all individuals purchase health insurance. This requirement of the ACA allows insurers to spread the financial risk of newly insured people with pre-existing conditions among a larger pool of individuals.

Additionally, a study done by Pauly and Herring estimates that individuals with pre-existing conditions in the 99th percentile of financial risk represented 3.95 times the average risk (mean). Figures from the House Committee on Energy and Commerce would indicate that approximately 1 million high-risk individuals will pursue insurance in the health benefits exchanges. Congress has estimated that 22 million people will be newly insured in the health benefits exchanges.

=== Subsidies ===
The subsidies for insurance premiums are given to individuals who buy a plan from an exchange and have a household income between 133% and 400% of the poverty line. Section 1401(36B) of PPACA explains that each subsidy will be provided as an advanceable, refundable tax credit and gives a formula for its calculation:

Except as provided in clause (ii), the applicable percentage with respect to any taxpayer for any taxable year is equal to 2.8 percent, increased by the number of percentage points (not greater than 7) which bears the same ratio to 7 percentage points as the taxpayer's household income for the taxable year in excess of 100 percent of the poverty line for a family of the size involved, bears to an amount equal to 200 percent of the poverty line for a family of the size involved. *(ii) SPECIAL RULE FOR TAXPAYERS UNDER 133 PERCENT OF POVERTY LINE- If a taxpayer's household income for the taxable year is in excess of 100 percent, but not more than 133 percent, of the poverty line for a family of the size involved, the taxpayer's applicable percentage shall be 2 percent.

— Patient Protection and Affordable Care Act: Title I: Subtitle E: Part I: Subpart A: Premium Calculation

A refundable tax credit is a way to provide government benefits to individuals who may have no tax liability (such as the earned income tax credit). The formula was changed in the amendments (HR 4872) passed March 23, 2010, in section 1001. To qualify for the subsidy, the beneficiaries cannot be eligible for other acceptable coverage. The U.S. Department of Health and Human Services (HHS) and Internal Revenue Service (IRS) on May 23, 2012, issued joint final rules regarding implementation of the new state-based health insurance exchanges to cover how the exchanges will determine eligibility for uninsured individuals and employees of small businesses seeking to buy insurance on the exchanges, as well as how the exchanges will handle eligibility determinations for low-income individuals applying for newly expanded Medicaid benefits. Premium caps have been delayed for a year on group plans, to give employers time to arrange new accounting systems, but the caps are still planned to take effect on schedule for insurance plans on the exchanges; the HHS and the Congressional Research Service calculated what the income-based premium caps for a "silver" healthcare plan for a family of four would be in 2014:

Annual Health Insurance Premiums and Cost Sharing under PPACA for Average Family of 4
Income		Premium			Additional Cost-Sharing Subsidy
% of Federal poverty level	Dollars (2014) (Note: In 2014, the FPL is projected to equal about $11,800 for a single person and about $24,000 for a family of four. See Subsidy Calculator for specific dollar amount.)	Cap (% of Income)	Max Out-of-Pocket	Avg Savings (Note: DHHS and CBO estimate the average annual premium cost in 2014 would be $11,328 for a family of 4 without the reform.)	Additional Cost-Sharing Subsidy
133%	$31,900	3%	$992	$10,345	$5,040
150%	$33,075	4%	$1,323	$9,918	$5,040
200%	$44,100	6.3%	$2,778	$8,366	$4,000
250%	$55,125	8.05%	$4,438	$6,597	$1,930
300%	$66,150	9.5%	$6,284	$4,628	$1,480
350%	$77,175	9.5%	$7,332	$3,512	$1,480
400%	$88,200	9.5%	$8,379	$2,395	$1,480
Notes

Maximum Out-of-Pocket Premium Payments

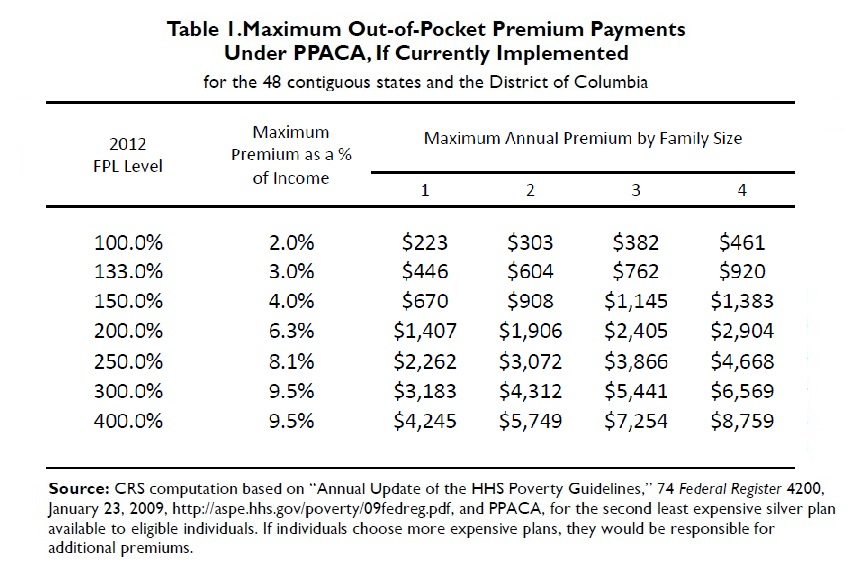
Maximum Out-of-Pocket Premium Payments Under PPACA by Family Size and federal poverty level. (Source: CRS)

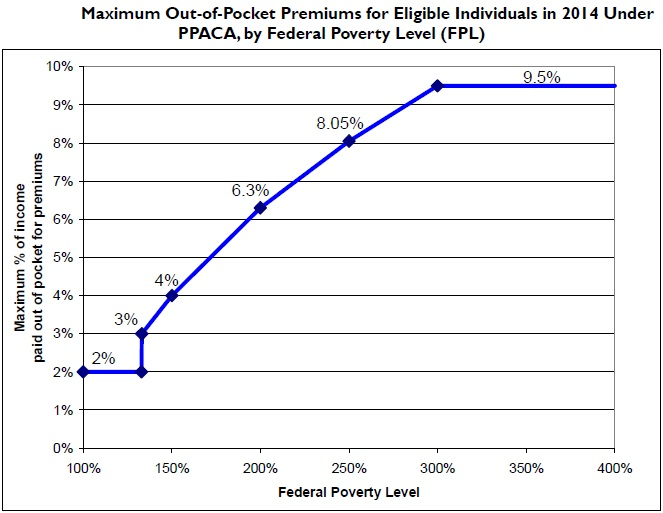
Maximum Out-of-Pocket Premium as Percentage of Family Income and federal poverty level (Source: CRS)

=== Comparable tiers of plans ===
Within the exchanges, insurance plans are offered in four tiers designated from lowest premium to highest premium: bronze, silver, gold, and platinum. The plans cover ranges from 60% to 90% of bills in increments of 10% for each plan. For those under 30 (and those with a hardship exemption), a fifth "catastrophic" tier is also available, with very high deductibles.

Insurance companies select the doctors and hospitals that are "in-network".

Proponents of health care reform believe that allowing comparable plans to compete for consumer business in one convenient location will drive prices down. Having a centralized location increases consumer knowledge of the market and allows for greater conformation to perfect competition. Each of these plans will also cap liabilities for consumers with out-of-pocket expenses at $6,350 for individuals and $12,700 for families.

== Acronym ==
HIX (Health Insurance eXchange) is emerging as the de facto acronym across state and federal government stakeholders, and the private sector technology and service providers that are helping states build their exchanges. The acronym HIX differentiates this topic from health information exchange, or HIE.

== Criticism and controversy ==
ACA Medicaid expansion by state. Not adopted Adopted Implemented

Exclusion of many lower-income individuals
NPR reported that large numbers of low income people were excluded in states that did not offer Medicaid expansion to 133% of the poverty line.
Data security
Minnesota's healthcare exchange was reported to have accidentally e-mailed personal information of more than 2,400 insurance agents to an insurance broker, according to the Minnesota Star Tribune.
Loss of group coverage for part-time employees
According to NPR, some employers such as Trader Joe's and Home Depot have decided to terminate health insurance for their part-time workers.
Scams
Scams were expected because of confusion over enrollment.
Restricted and narrow networks
Some exchanges have been criticized for offering health plans that necessitate too many out-of-network claims. On October 5, 2013, Seattle Children's hospital filed a lawsuit for "failure to ensure adequate network coverage" when only two insurers included Children's in their marketplace plan.
Concerns have also been raised about insurance carriers' efforts to limit the number of providers in their networks to reduce costs. A study of the California marketplace confirmed these concerns, but also showed that geographic access was similar and quality at times superior in marketplace-based plans.
"Cherry-picking"
The private health insurance industry fears that restricted eligibility and a market size that is too small could result in higher premiums, encourage "cherry-picking" of customers by insurers, and force a clearance of the exchange. That is what some believe will happen in Texas and California in their failed exchanges. One of these factors, "cherry-picking" of customers, will not be possible in the state-run exchanges mandated by the ACA, because all insurance plans will be "guaranteed issue" in 2014. Furthermore, the law will bring millions of new enrollees into the marketplace by way of the individual mandate requirement for all citizens to purchase health insurance and increase market size.
Demand curve
Some regulations can distort the supply and demand curves in the health insurance marketplace and cause uninsured people. The minimum essential coverage have been criticized as the Broccoli mandate. As an alternative, health insurance marketplaces which allow different cost-effectiveness thresholds have been proposed.

== State-based Marketplaces ==
A State-based Marketplace (SBM) is a state-specific online marketplace where American citizens and legal residents can comparison shop, apply, and enroll in subsidized health insurance plans via a government agency. Similar to Healthcare.gov, but created and maintained by the individual state. Sometimes referred to as a State-based Exchange (SBE), State-based marketplaces strive to limit consumer confusion by standardizing information on plan benefits and making it easier to compare insurance policy cost and quality.

=== States with State-based Marketplaces ===
State-based Marketplaces have developed as technology matures and the market and individual state needs have changed. Numerous states have opted to implement their own SBM.

This includes:

- California – Covered California
- Colorado – Connect for Health Colorado
- Connecticut – Access Health CT
- District of Columbia – DC Health Link
- Idaho – Your Health Idaho
- Kentucky - kynect
- Maryland – Maryland Health Connection
- Massachusetts – Health Connector
- Minnesota – MNsure
- Nevada - Nevada Health Link
- New Jersey – Get Covered NJ
- New York – New York State of Health
- Pennsylvania – Pennie
- Rhode Island – HealthSource RI
- Vermont – Vermont Health Connect
- Washington – Washington Healthplanfinder

=== Cover Oregon website failure ===
In March 2015, Oregon officially abolished its state-run health insurance marketplace, "Cover Oregon", in favor of a federally-run exchange.

== Private health insurance exchanges ==
A private health insurance exchange is an exchange run by a private sector company or nonprofit. Health plans and insurance carriers in a private exchange must meet certain criteria defined by the exchange management. Private exchanges combine technology and human advocacy, and include online eligibility verification and mechanisms for allowing employers who connect their employees or retirees with exchanges to offer subsidies. They are designed to help consumers find plans personalized to their specific health conditions, preferred doctor/hospital networks, and budget.

Private health exchanges predate the Affordable Care Act. One example of an early health care exchange is International Medical Exchange (IMX), a company venture financed in Louisville, Kentucky, by Standard Telephones and Cables, a large British technology company (now Nortel), to develop the exchange concept in the U.S. using on-line technology. The product was created in the mid-1980s. IMX developed an eligibility verification system, a claims management system, and a bank-based payments administration system that would manage payments between the patient, the employer, and the insurance carrier. Like proposed exchanges today, it focused on standards of care, utilization review by a third party, private insurer participation, and cost reduction for the health care system through product simplification. The focus was on creating local or regional exchanges that offered a series of standardized health care plans that reduced the complexity and cost of acquiring or understanding health care insurance, while simplifying claims administration. The system was modeled after the standardized stock exchange and banking industry back office processes. The major difference was that IMX health care exchanges would provide their products through a national network of existing commercial banks rather than setting up a duplicate payment and administration systems network as proposed today. The IMX product rights were acquired by Anthem (then Blue Cross and Blue Shield of Kentucky). The exchange product became the basis for inter-carrier claims settlement between commercial insurance carriers and Blue Cross organizations. The founders of IMX were from top management at Humana, and top management of First Tennessee National Corp (now First Horizon).

In overlapping markets, the co-existence of public and private exchange plans can lead to confusion when speaking of an "exchange plan." In California, Anthem Blue Cross offers HMO plans through both the state-run Covered California exchange and the private CaliforniaChoice exchange, but doctor networks are not identical. Physicians advertising acceptance of Anthem Blue Cross Exchange HMOs may misinform individuals enrolled in Anthem Blue Cross Exchange HMOs through the private exchange.

== See also ==
- Health care reform
- Healthcare reform in the United States
- Health system
- Health Advocate
- Health insurance
- Health Insurance Innovations
- Universal health coverage by country
