= Pre-existing Condition Insurance Plan =

The Pre-existing Condition Insurance Plan (PCIP) was a form of health insurance coverage offered to uninsured Americans who were unable to obtain coverage because of a pre-existing condition. These provided coverage to as many as 350,000 people to fill the gap until the Affordable Care Act went into effect in 2014. The plan was funded by Congress through the Department of Health and Human Services to monitor and distribute. States had programs either operated individually run or administered by HHS with 23 states and the District of Columbia. The plans were open through an Association or Government Employees Health Association (GEHA). The program has since ceased in order to make certain funding would be sufficient to carry the existing approximately 100,000 members it has taken on since PCIP inception.

To be eligible, patients were required to have a pre-existing condition, be uninsured for at least 6 months, and be a US citizen or a legal resident.

The Affordable Care Act provided federal funding to support Pre-Existing Condition Insurance Plans in every state and downloadable applications were available in the states where the US Department of Health and Human Services was running the PCIP. In those states, coverage began on August 1, 2010 for applicants who applied by July 15, 2010.

Pre-Existing Condition Insurance Plans were designed to provide affordable insurance to Americans with pre-existing conditions. The premiums were based on the standard cost of an individual health insurance policy in the health insurance pool's geographic area and out-of-pocket maximums were limited to $5,950 for individuals and $11,900 for families.

== Current Status of Pre-existing Condition Insurance Plans under ACA ==
As of 2014, PCIP plans are no longer available. Rather, US citizens may opt to enroll in affordable health insurance plans through the Health insurance marketplace. Marketplace plans must cover treatment for pre-existing medical conditions. No insurance participating in the health insurance market place can reject an individual for coverage, charge more, or refuse to pay for essential health services for any prior medical condition. Moreover, once an individual is enrolled in the marketplace, insurance plans cannot deny coverage or raise rates solely based on their health.

== Pre-existing Condition Insurance Plan for non–US citizens in the United States ==
There are several short term medical plans which cover uninsured non-US citizens who are visiting or living in the United States that cover pre-existing conditions. As opposed to traditional short term health insurance plans, these policies cover all pre-existing conditions. These plans cover more than typical acute onset of pre-existing condition plans. Pre-Existing coverage policies for non-US Citizens are known as short term "Full Pre-Existing" coverage policies. Full Pre-Existing coverage plans cover all pre-existing conditions with no look back period.

Full Pre-Existing policies may cover in-patient, out-patient, and specialist care related to the worsening of a pre-existing condition. However, unlike the ACA, they do not provide any preventive or maintenance care for pre-existing conditions. For insured members already undergoing care for a pre-existing conditions, these plans provide no coverage.

== See also ==
- United States Department of Health and Human Services
- Visitor health insurance
