= Executive Order 13813 =

Executive order from 2017

- Executive Order Promoting Healthcare Choice and Competition
- Type: Executive order
- Number: 13813
- President: Donald Trump
- Signed: October 12, 2017

Federal Register details
- Federal Register document number: 2017-22677
- Publication date: October 17, 2017
- Document citation: 82-48385

Summary
- Allows insurance companies to sell low-cost short-term plans with lesser coverage; Enables small business to collectively purchase association health plans; Expands health savings accounts

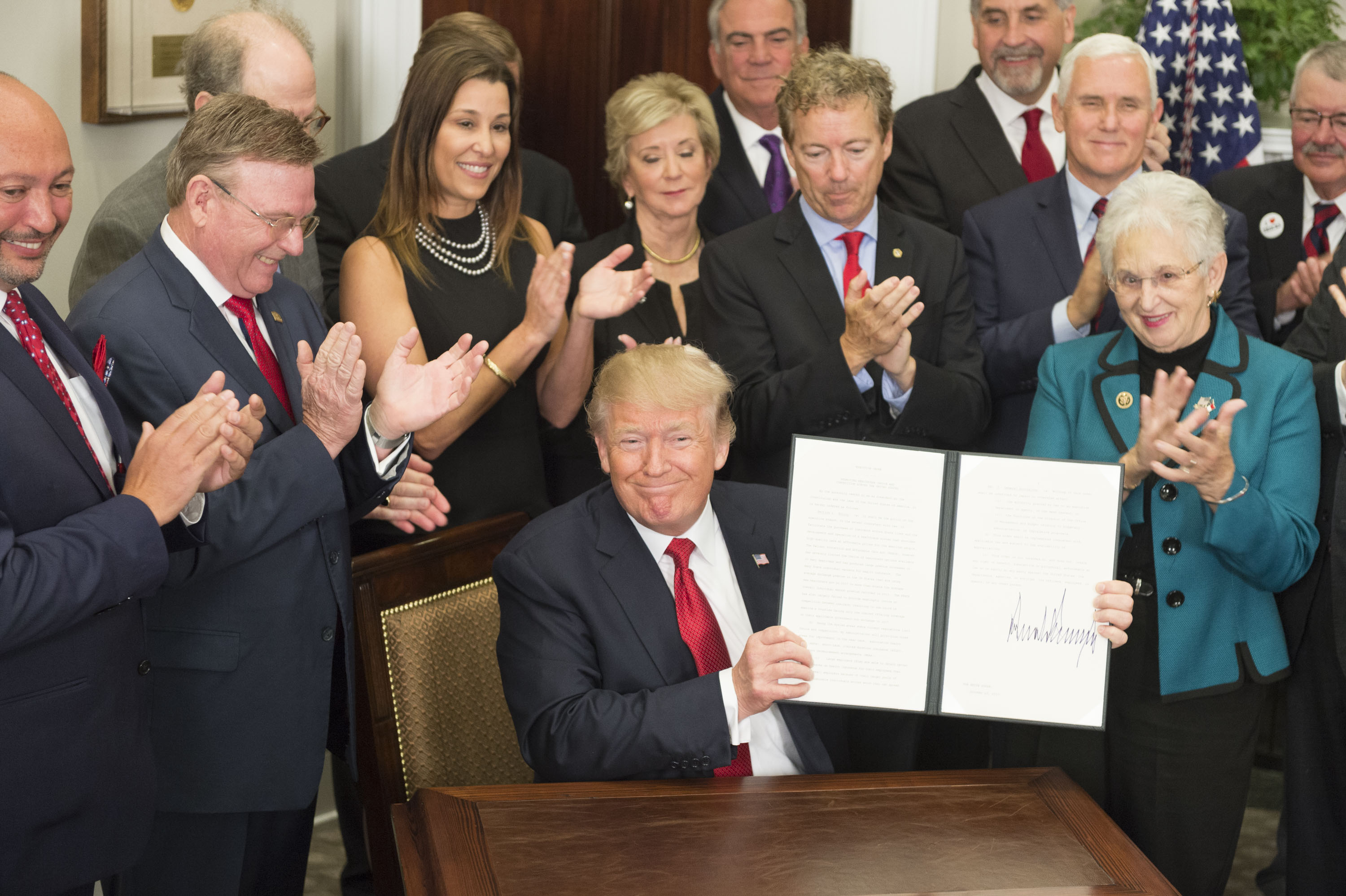
President Trump signing the Executive Order, October 12, 2017.

The Executive Order Promoting Healthcare Choice and Competition, also known as the Trumpcare Executive Order, or Trumpcare, is an Executive Order signed by Donald Trump on October 12, 2017, which directs federal agencies to modify how the Patient Protection and Affordable Care Act of the Obama Administration is implemented. The order included a directive to federal agencies to end rules forbidding employers from using health reimbursement arrangements (HRAs) to pay individual insurance premiums.

In a separate announcement made shortly after the order was signed, Trump announced that he would end subsidies to health insurance companies that sell to low-income consumers through the state health insurance marketplaces.

Some sources have described the effect of these executive actions as replacing Obamacare with a new healthcare regime; several days after signing the order, Donald Trump himself stated in a press conference that reporters should no longer refer to "Obamacare" because "it's gone, there is no such thing as Obamacare anymore".

Executive Order 13813 was formally revoked by President Joe Biden on January 28, 2021.

The Executive Order revoking Executive Order 13813, was revoked by Donald Trump on January 20, 2025.

== History ==
=== Legislative efforts to repeal the Affordable Care Act ===
The first executive order signed by U.S. President Donald Trump, executed just hours after he was sworn into office on January 20, 2017, was Executive Order 13765, titled Executive Order Minimizing the Economic Burden of the Patient Protection and Affordable Care Act Pending Repeal. The order set out interim procedures in anticipation of repeal of the Patient Protection and Affordable Care Act (popularly known as the ACA, or Obamacare). The order came on Trump's campaign pledges to repeal the Patient Protection and Affordable Care Act, which Trump stated would take a long time, with a replacement possibly not being ready until 2018.

On May 4, 2017, the United States House of Representatives voted to pass the American Health Care Act of 2017 (ACHA) by a narrow margin of 217–213, sending the bill to the Senate for deliberation. It would repeal the parts of the Affordable Care Act within the scope of the federal budget, including provisions contained within the Internal Revenue Code such as the "individual mandates" (in IRC § 205), employer mandates (in IRC § 206) and various taxes (IRC § 201 et. seq.), and also modifications to the federal Medicaid program (in Sections 111-116 and 121).

The nonpartisan Congressional Budget Office projected that the AHCA would increase the number of uninsured people by 23 million over 10 years, but would decrease the federal budget deficit by $119 billion over the same period (about 1%), mainly by cutting Medicaid coverage for lower income Americans. Both the House AHCA bill and Senate BCRA bill would cut taxes largely for wealthy Americans. Insurance premiums were projected to decrease for younger, healthier, and wealthier people, while older and poorer people would likely see their premiums increase.

Senate Republicans initially approached the AHCA with an unprecedented level of secrecy; a group of 13 Republican senators drafted the Senate's substitute version in private, raising bipartisan concerns about a lack of transparency and about the all-male composition of the committee. On June 22, 2017, Republicans released the first discussion draft for an amendment to the bill. On July 25, 2017, although no amendment proposal had yet garnered majority support, Senate Republicans voted to advance the bill to the floor and begin formal consideration of amendments.

On July 28, 2017, the bill was returned to the calendar after the Senate rejected several amendments, including S.Amdt. 667, the "Skinny Repeal" package offered by Sen. Mitch McConnell, which failed on a 49–51 vote. Sens. John McCain, Susan Collins, and Lisa Murkowski were the only Republicans to vote against the measure. On September 13, 2017, Senators Graham, Cassidy, Heller, and Johnson released a draft amendment to the bill that "repeals the structure and architecture of Obamacare and replaces it with a block grant given annually to states". However, it was not voted upon due to lack of support. The deadline for Congressional Republicans to end the ACA as part of the Congressional budget reconciliation process (which would enable Senate Republicans to pass new legislation with 51 votes, rather than 60) then expired on September 30, 2017.

=== Execution of the Executive Order ===
Following the failure of Congress to repeal the ACA through legislation, Trump issued the new order. Both supporters and critics asserted that the provisions of the order were intended to redefine the American health care market and effectively replace Obamacare with a new health care regime. Trump briefly forgot to sign the order before leaving the signing ceremony, but was ushered back to the table by Vice President Mike Pence to complete this step. Senator Rand Paul, who attended the signing, described the order as "the biggest free market reform of health care in a generation."

== Provisions ==
The order reverses a number of aspects of Obamacare upon which that regime had relied.

Section 1, title "Policy", lays out the policies supporting the provisions of the order, noting that the order directs that the government "facilitate the purchase of insurance across State lines" and prioritizes "association health plans (AHPs), short-term, limited-duration insurance (STLDI), and health reimbursement arrangements (HRAs)". Whereas Obamacare had prohibited insurance companies from selling low-cost short-term health insurance plans "that can circumvent some of the mandates created under Obamacare", such as requiring coverage for persons with preexisting conditions, and requiring coverage for various medical services. The order reversed this prohibition, and also directs the Departments of Health and Human Services, Labor, and Treasury to ease access to "association health plans", which also need not provide the coverage that had been mandated by Obamacare, and expands health savings accounts.

Section 2, titled "Expanded Access to Association Health Plans", directs the Secretary of Labor to take steps to "expand access to health coverage by allowing more employers to form AHPs".

Section 3, titled "Expanded Availability of Short-Term, Limited‑Duration Insurance", directs the Secretaries of the Treasury, Labor, and Health and Human Services to take steps to "expand the availability of STLDI".

Section 4, titled "Expanded Availability and Permitted Use of Health Reimbursement Arrangements", directs the Secretaries of the Treasury, Labor, and Health and Human Services to take steps to "increase the usability of HRAs, to expand employers' ability to offer HRAs to their employees, and to allow HRAs to be used in conjunction with nongroup coverage".

== Impact ==
A separate decision on the same day commonly associated with the executive order resulted in no longer paying the cost sharing reduction (CSR) subsidies, which are payments to insurers to keep premiums down for low-income persons. The Congressional Budget Office reported in August 2017 that not making the CSR payments could increase health insurance premiums on the ACA exchanges by as much as 20% and add nearly $200 billion to the budget deficit over a decade. The deficit increase is because the premium tax credit subsidy (the largest Affordable Care Act subsidy) increases to offset increases in health insurance premium amounts, far outweighing savings from not paying the smaller CSR subsidy.

== Reception ==
=== Critical response ===
Critics described the Executive Order as another part of an ongoing strategy to sabotage the ACA by enabling insurance companies to circumvent ACA mandates and sell insurance that does not cover mandated conditions, and excludes individuals with pre-existing conditions. Other elements alleged to be part of the sabotage strategy include denying funding not mandated by law for cost sharing reduction (CSR) subsidies, significantly reducing funding for enrollment advertising and support efforts, asserting that the ACA exchanges are in a "death spiral" (contrary to CBO conclusions), and conducting negative advertising campaigns, among other measures.

For example, President Trump tweeted on October 13, 2017, that: "The Democrats ObamaCare is imploding. Massive subsidy payments to their pet insurance companies has stopped. Dems should call me to fix!". Journalist Ezra Klein wrote that: "Trump has long held the view that if he can inflict sufficient damage to the Affordable Care Act, Democrats will have no choice but to cut a deal — on Trump's terms — to save it".

Journalist Sarah Kliff wrote that: "Trump announced last week he would stop making [CSR] payments. But let's be clear: That decision will cause the federal government to spend billions more subsidizing insurance companies, not less." That is because the savings from reducing CSR payments is less than increases in the insurance premium tax credits, which rise along with sizable (20%+) premium increases for 2018 caused by Trump's threats to the CSR payments during 2017. Kliff used the CBO estimate of $194 billion in higher budget deficits from stopping CSR payments as an estimate of the net impact over a decade.

Journalist David Leonhardt wrote on October 15, 2017: "Last week, the administration took several steps to deprive people of health insurance. In doing so, it has both a short-term goal (have the federal government do less to help vulnerable citizens) and a long-term goal (sabotage Obamacare, so that Congress can more easily repeal the law)". He continued: "When [the executive order] takes full effect, it will most likely allow a variety of cheap insurance plans that don't cover many treatments. These plans will siphon healthy families from the normal markets, raising prices on the sick. It will work nicely for healthy families, until it doesn't. If they get sick and want insurance that pays for their treatments, they will be out of luck".

According to The Economist, Trump's plans "are likely to end up inflicting the most pain on self-employed, middle- to upper-income folk—in other words, on a Republican constituency".

==== Murray—Alexander Individual Market Stabilization Bill ====
Senator Lamar Alexander and Senator Patty Murray reached a compromise to amend the Affordable Care Act to fund cost-sharing reductions. President Trump had stopped paying the cost sharing subsidies and the Congressional Budget Office estimated his action would cost $200 billion, cause insurance sold on the exchange to cost 20% more and cause one million people to lose insurance. The plan will also provide more flexibility for state waivers, allow a new "Copper Plan" or catastrophic coverage for all, allow interstate insurance compacts, and redirect consumer fees to states for outreach.

Although Trump initially expressed support for the compromise, he later reversed course by tweeting a dismissive tweet about it.

== See also ==
- Executive Order 13765
- Tax Cuts and Jobs Act of 2017
