= Cadillac insurance plan =

Unusually expensive health insurance plan

Informally, a Cadillac plan is any unusually expensive health insurance plan, usually arising in discussions of medical-cost control measures in the United States. The term derives from the Cadillac automobile, which has represented American luxury goods since its introduction in 1902, and as a health care metaphor dates to the 1970s. The term gained popularity in the early 1990s during the debate over the Clinton health care plan of 1993, and was also widespread during debate over possible excise taxes on "Cadillac" plans during the health care reforms proposed during the Obama administration. (Bills proposed by Clinton and Obama did not use the term "Cadillac".)

A study published in Health Affairs in December 2009 found that high-cost health plans do not provide unusually rich benefits to enrollees. The researchers found that 3.7% of the variation in the cost of family coverage in employer-sponsored health plans is attributable to differences in the actuarial value of benefits. 6.1% Of the variation is attributable to the combination of benefit design and plan type (e.g., PPO, HMO, etc.). The employer's industry and regional variations in health care costs explain part of the variation. The researchers conclude "…that analysts should not equate high-cost plans with Cadillac plans, but that in fact other factors—industry and cost of medical inputs—are as important in predicting whether a plan is a high-cost plan. Without appropriate adjustments, a simple cap may exacerbate rather than ameliorate current inequities."

== Subsequently Repealed Tax on Cadillac Plans ==
The Patient Protection and Affordable Care Act (PPACA, as amended by the Health Care and Education Reconciliation Act of 2010), would have imposed an annual 40% excise tax on plans with annual premiums exceeding $10,800 for individuals or $29,500 for a family starting in 2020, to be paid by insurers. The tax was originally set to take effect in 2018. However, in December 2015, a law delayed the start date to 2020. In January 2018, the implementation was postponed until 2022. In December 2019, it was repealed entirely.

The tax was not imposed on the total cost of the plan, but on the costs exceeding the aforementioned values, the ceiling for which was to be adjusted to inflation annually after 2020. Costs included any part of a person's income allocated to flexible spending accounts, health reimbursement accounts, and health savings accounts, but not expenditures for stand-alone dental, vision, accident, disability, or long-term care insurance coverage. In the December 2015 changes, Congress made the tax a deductible business expense, to reduce the impact on businesses that pay income tax. The tax was intended to do three things: help finance the PPACA; reduce overall health care costs; and address the unequal tax benefit of excluding employer-based health insurance coverage from taxes.

Although the tax plan was positioned to combat a "luxury", the tax as originally enacted would have affected more employees over time. The threshold was initially indexed to the Consumer Price Index (CPI), plus 1 percentage point, and was to be indexed to unmodified CPI starting in 2021. Because medical inflation has historically been higher than general inflation, this indexing method would have subjected more employees' plans to the tax as healthcare costs rose. Because healthcare savings accounts were included in the plan cost calculation, it may have affected or tended to reduce healthcare savings accounts as well. A study from the Kaiser Family Foundation estimated 26 percent of all employers would face the tax in at least one of their plans in 2018, when the tax was then scheduled to be implemented. Labor unions opposed this tax because they believed it would be "very disruptive" to their healthcare plans, and asked that their members be eligible for the same federal subsidies available to low-income workers in the new health exchanges.

== See also ==
- Luxury tax
- Health care reform in the United States
