= Visitor health insurance =

Type of short-term travel insurance

Visitor’s health insurance, also known as visitor’s medical insurance, is a form of short-term travel medical insurance policy that visitors of any country can purchase to obtain coverage protection for accidental injury or disease that occurs during their stay in the host country.

The United States had a requirement for some travelers to obtain visitor health insurance in 2019-2020 but it was rescinded in 2021.

This type of private health coverage for visitors is purchased as a short term health plan that provides medical coverage beyond national borders, and only for the duration of travel or stay outside the home country. These insurance plans also provide medical evacuation and repatriation benefits as part of the covered features.

== United States ==
=== Types of plans ===
In the US, visitors insurance plans are broadly classified as either fixed or comprehensive. Fixed plans, also called limited or scheduled benefit plans, are basic visitor insurance plans. They are generally low-cost, and pay for covered expenses up to an amount on a predetermined or scheduled benefit table available in the plan brochure, which can be reviewed before purchase of the policy. Comprehensive coverage plans pay a percentage amount for each eligible expense. Typically, these plans will cover up to 70–90% up to the first $5,000 on a policy, then 100% thereafter. Comprehensive coverage plans typically offer more benefits than basic plans, and also offer coverage for acute onset of preexisting conditions. In Canada there is Super Visa Insurance for parents and grandparents for upto 10 years to be renewd every 2 years.

=== Common exclusions and clauses ===
Common exclusions are preexisting conditions, maternity care, childbirth, preventative care (immunizations, regular check-ups, physical exams, etc.), prescription eye exams and glasses, cosmetic procedures, and dental work not related to an accident/emergency.

==== Acute onset clauses ====
Most insurance companies do not offer preexisting condition coverage, but many plans do offer acute onset coverage, age and other exclusions apply. There are a lot of exceptions that may apply when it comes to the acute onset clause. For most insurance companies, the insured must seek medical attention within a 12 or 24-hour window after initial symptom's manifestation in order to be considered acute-onset relapse or recurrence of preexisting conditions.

== Aruba ==
During the height of the COVID-19 pandemic, the island nation of Aruba instituted a visitors' insurance plan. As of 2022, visitors' travel insurance is no longer mandatory for travel to Aruba, but it is still recommended.

Aruba's insurance plan covers up to $75,000 in costs, and can cover a range of COVID-19-related medical costs, as well as $125 per day for five days for those who test positive for COVID-19, due to the government of Aruba's mandatory quarantine in such cases.

Premiums for this insurance are grouped by age (prices in USD):

- Ages 0–14: $12
- Ages 15–65: $15
- Ages 66+: $25
