= Death Risk Rankings =

- Available in: English
- Owner: Carnegie Mellon University
- Website: https://web.archive.org/web/20110202131335/http://deathriskrankings.com/
- Launched: August 27, 2009
- Current status: Inactive

Death Risk Rankings was a website that approximated the likelihood of a European or American person dying within a twelve-month span. Using public data to do its calculations, the website also listed the possible causes of death, including illnesses or accidents.

Created by Carnegie Mellon University in Pittsburgh, Pennsylvania, Death Risk Rankings has been nicknamed the "death calculator".

== History ==
Death Risk Rankings was created by researchers and students at Carnegie Mellon University in Pittsburgh, Pennsylvania. The website was developed by Paul Fischbeck, a professor of Social and Decision Sciences and Engineering and Public Policy at Carnegie Mellon, and David Gerard, associate professor of Economics and Public Policy at Lawrence University in Appleton, Wisconsin. Fischbeck believed that the website will provide lawmakers with ideas during the health care reform debate.

Death Risk Rankings has been nicknamed the "death calculator" according to Kaytie Dowling of The Intelligencer & Wheeling News Register.

On August 27, 2009, the day it was launched, Death Risk Rankings had about a million visitors per hour. The website then crashed and was inaccessible for two hours due to server issues. In twenty-four hours, the website had surpassed Carnegie Mellon University's bandwidth cap for one month.

The website has not been available since mid 2011.

== Death rankings ==
The website based its results on the public information gathered by the Centers for Disease Control and Prevention (CDC) for data in the United States and Eurostat for data in Europe.

Death Risk Rankings did not use genetics or an individual's way of living in its calculations. However, the website was able to determine the possibility of death using information such as location, gender, and age. After submitting the information, users were able to view their chance of dying that year of sixty-six different causes, such as murder, a number of illnesses, and accidents.
