= Short-term health insurance =

In the United States, short-term health insurance (STHI) or short-term, limited-duration insurance (STLDI) refers to health insurance plans with a limited duration, typically several months to a year. These plans were initially geared toward people who need temporary medical insurance to bridge the gap between longer-term plans. For instance, people who are switching employers, starting graduate school, or young adults who have become ineligible for coverage under their parents' plans and are searching for their own insurance might use a short-term insurance plan until obtaining a more permanent solution.

Short-term, limited-duration health care plans are not available for purchase on HealthCare.gov or health insurance marketplaces in most states. They are not eligible for federal financial aid but the monthly healthcare premiums may be less expensive.

Short-term health insurance plans are exempt from most insurance regulations established by the Affordable Care Act, are not required to cover the full list of health benefits required by that legislation, and may offer lower premiums to individuals who enroll prior to developing pre-existing conditions. This caused problems for people who acquire a longer-term illness, since the short-term plan is completely terminated at the end of the coverage period. A 2019 federal rule extended the duration of short-term plans to 365 days, lifting a 3-month term limit established at the end of 2016. Starting in 2019, consumers will be able to purchase short-term plans which are renewable for up to 3 years in some states. This extension was reversed in 2024, limiting Short-term plans to 4 months of coverage (3 months plus one extension).

Short-term plans were not considered "adequate coverage" under the Affordable Care Act, and customers were subject to the individual mandate penalty from 2014 until its elimination by the Congressional Tax Cuts and Jobs Act at the end of 2018. In 2018, the Congressional Budget Office broadened its definition of health insurance to include short-term health insurance.
