= Affordable Care Act Health Insurance Rate Review Program =

The Affordable Care Act (ACA) established the health insurance rate review program in order to protect consumers from unreasonable rate increases. Through this program, proposed premium increases in the small group and individual markets that are above a threshold amount (ten percent or more, as of February 2014) are reviewed by states or the federal government to determine whether the increases are reasonable.

== Background ==
Health insurance premiums have risen steadily from 2000 to 2009 and have outpaced general inflation and wages. A number of factors have contributed to rising premiums including increases in spending on hospital and physician services, changes in the benefits covered by health insurance policies, and changes in the demographics of insured individuals. Even before the passage of the ACA, many states already had existing health insurance rate review programs to review proposed increases in insurance premiums. However, there was marked variation between the states' programs. Namely, there was variation in the review processes as well as the market segments (i.e. individual, small group) for which the review processes were applied. The type of information that was made available to the public also differed among the various states with review programs. Furthermore, there were differences in regards to the threshold amount that triggered a review. Some states, in fact, reviewed all proposed rate changes regardless of size. With passage of the ACA, much of this variability is reduced as it sets a minimum set of requirements for rate review programs. The ACA also allocates grants to states to enhance their rate review activities.

== ACA Rate Review Program Provisions ==
Under the rule, a rate review program was established to ensure that all rate increases that meet or exceed a specified threshold are reviewed by a state or the Department of Health and Human Services (DHHS) to determine if they are unreasonable and to publish these rate increases for public view. Rate increases are subject to review if they are an increase of ten percent or more and filed in a state on or after July 1, 2011. The choice of using 10 percent as a threshold was deemed to be appropriate based on the analysis of the trend in health care costs and rate increases before its enactment. It was also necessary to define an "unreasonable" rate increase and the initial 10 percent threshold was intended to be transitional, until state-specific thresholds are put in place. The 10 percent transitional threshold also balances the need to provide more disclosure to consumers while avoiding undue administrative burdens on other stakeholders.

Health insurers are required to submit justifications for "unreasonable" premium increases to the Secretary of the DHHS and the state before the implementation of the increase. If the insurer does not comply, DHHS could seek a court order to force compliance. If the justifications submitted by the insurer remain unreasonable, then some states have the power to deny the proposed increase in premium. These provisions apply to coverage sold to both individuals and small employers. The rule, however, does not apply to grandfathered health plan coverages, or plans that were purchased before July 2011. The three criteria used by DHHS to determine if the rate increase is unreasonable and excessive include:

1. If it causes the premium to be unjustifiably high in relation to benefits. For example, the rate increase might result in a medical loss ratio below the applicable federal standard (between 80 and 85%).
2. If the insurer provides incomplete or inadequate data and documentation.
3. If it results in premium differences between insured people with similar risks.

== Rate Review Transparency ==
Prior to ACA implementation, some states voluntarily offered rate review information; however, with the passing of the rule all states are now required to provide this information. ACA implementation requires the reporting of increases at or beyond the ten percent threshold to be posted on a state website with the ability to receive comments from the public and allow for insurance companies to "provide easy to understand information to their customers about their reasons for unreasonable rate increases, as well as publicly justify … any unreasonable rate increases." In 2010, the Centers for Medicare & Medicaid (CMS) performed a review of the states and their readiness to assist with the mandated rate review, which revealed that 42 states had effective review for all insurance markets, two states had effective rate review for individual market only, and six states and four U.S. territories were deemed to not have effective programs in place. Despite the majority of states possessing adequate programs, the information continues to be reported in a variety of fashions with each state posting information in a unique way. This has resulted in a spectrum including limited information from some states while others provide comprehensive reviews. In addition, some state websites offer easy access to rate review information, while others are difficult to locate. Kaiser Family Foundation (KFF) noted in their 2012 healthcare reform report that three states had no rate review information found on their website. Two of these three states did not maintain a program for rate reporting and the third state, West Virginia, required consumers to request information. According to the CMS website, DHHS is required to perform the review of states who lack adequate programs; however, there are at least 20 states requiring their review despite possessing state rate review programs. The KFF survey found many states report through more than one method. The states' collection and display of rate review information could be organized into three categories: a state generated summary table containing filed rates with reported approval, a link to a comprehensive database of rate filings, or a link to the federal website containing rate review information; www.data.healthcare.gov. Of the states that link to the original filings, the majority use System for Electronic Rate and Form Filing (SERFF), which was developed by the National Association of Insurance Commission (NAIC). Despite the uniformity of SERFF reporting, the states continue to vary in terms of the information they provide on SERFF itself.

== Rate Review Grants ==
In an effort to fortify and improve the rate review processes, through the ACA the federal government provided the states with $250 million for Health Insurance Review Grants. The allocated amount is to be used within five years, beginning in 2010. Health Insurance Premium Review Grants also provide funds to enhance pricing transparency by establishing Data Centers. In addition to gathering and displaying the rate review information, the Data Centers also collect the various prices of procedures within a given region or entity. This data collection will provide evidence for researchers to better understand cost drivers, utilization of services, and quality improvement initiatives. Rate Review Grants are provided only to states that apply. The funds were not released simultaneously, as they were dispersed in three cycles. The first round of grants, known as Cycle I, totaled $46 million and were awarded on August 16, 2010. In order to qualify for the grant, states needed to propose a prospective plan on how funds would develop or enhance state rate review processes. Cycle II grants, totaling $109 million and dispersed on September 20, 2011, were awarded to states that either had or were in the process of developing effective rate review programs. States could only qualify for Cycle II grants if their prospective plan, developed during Cycle I, was in progress. Cycle III grants totaled $87 million and were disbursed on September 23, 2013, with the objective of supporting state health insurance rate review and increasing transparency of health care pricing. Of note, the specific amount awarded to states differ depending on particular needs and areas of improvement as presented through the application process. The baseline award for Cycles I, II, and III were $1 million, $3 million, and $2 million per state, respectively. Alaska, Florida, Georgia, Iowa, Wyoming, Idaho and Oklahoma either did not apply or returned funds allocated to their respective states.

== Effects for Consumers and Regulatory Impact Analysis ==
In terms of reducing rate increases for consumers, the 2012 KFF study showed that, on average, the rates that went into effect after implementation of the ACA's rate review provisions were 20.1% lower than rates initially requested by insurers. This has resulted in an estimated $1 billion in savings for consumers. The rates that went into effect in the individual market were 1.4 percentage points lower than the rates originally proposed by insurance companies, which equated to nearly $425 million in savings for consumers. In the small group market, rates that went into effect were 0.8 percentage points lower, which equated to over $600 million in savings.

The DHHS noted in 2013 a decline in the proportion of rate filings in which the requested increase was at or above the premium increase threshold of 10 percent when compared to 2010. Namely, 75 percent of rate filings in 2010 requested increases of 10 percent or more versus only 34 percent of rate filings in 2013. Preliminary data has also suggested that the slowdown in approved rate increases above the threshold from 2010 to 2012 has continued. In 2013, the number of approved policy rate increases above the threshold was 14% lower when compared to 2012. Further, the average increase for policies in 2013 was shown to be slightly below the level in 2012, providing no indication of an acceleration in the growth rate of 2013 premiums for consumers. In addition to cost savings for consumers, some states are also leveraging their rate review programs to improve consumer education. In 2010, Oregon used its rate review authority to analyze, respond to, and correct inaccuracies in insurers' communications with enrollees. According to state regulators, Oregon-based insurers were sending customers correspondence suggesting that their entire rate increase was attributable to the ACA's early market reforms. Using rate review, regulators were able to ascertain that the early market reforms had a negligible impact on premiums and began requiring carriers to submit their draft correspondence with enrollees, to be checked for accuracy. To further ensure transparency, the Oregon Department of Consumer and Business Services posts all correspondence between the department and insurer actuaries on its website daily.

== Criticisms ==
Critics have said that the rate review process is not robust enough. Without a federally mandated provision giving the ability to deny excessive rate increases, some insurances companies are still raising rates as much as before. For example, California can review rate requests for technical errors, but cannot deny rate increases. Notably, an initiative measure, "Approval of Healthcare Insurance Rate Changes," will be on the November 2014 Statewide Ballot to require that health insurance rate changes be approved by the Insurance Commissioner before taking effect. Another criticism relates to the trigger for a rate review. Some consumer groups argue that the trigger for a review should include additional factors aside from just the proposed percentage increase in the premium. These same groups want health insurance plans that have medical loss ratios under 80 percent to be subject to rate review. In terms of efficacy of the rate review program, those in the insurance industry argue that rate increases are the result, not the driver, of rising healthcare costs, and that insurance companies' administrative costs and profits equal just 4 percent of national health expenditures. Rather than having regulators focus on restricting insurance rate increases, they say, government and others should make greater efforts to control underlying health spending, such as the outlays for hospital and physician services. Furthermore, insurers have raised the possibility that, if they are forced to accept rate increases that do not keep up with cost trends, pricing will be unsustainable in the long run. This could lead to insurers being driven out of business or forced to abandon particular markets or states.

== See also ==
- Health insurance in the United States
- Patient Protection and Affordable Care Act
- United States Department of Health and Human Services
