= Executive Order 13765 =

Executive order signed by U.S. President Donald Trump

- Executive Order Minimizing the Economic Burden of the Patient Protection and Affordable Care Act Pending Repeal
- Type: Executive order
- Number: 13765
- President: Donald Trump
- Signed: January 20, 2017

Federal Register details
- Federal Register document number: 2017-01799
- Publication date: January 24, 2017
- Document citation: 8351

Summary
- Directs agencies to hinder parts of Patient Protection and Affordable Care Act (Obamacare) that entail financial burdens, and begin transition to repeal of that law

Executive Order 13765 is the first executive order signed by U.S. President Donald Trump during his first presidency on January 20, 2017, which set out interim procedures in anticipation of efforts to repeal the Affordable Care Act (Obamacare).

The executive order came on Trump's campaign pledges to repeal the Patient Protection and Affordable Care Act, and occurred just hours after he was sworn into office. Trump stated sorting out a replacement will take a long time and the replacement may not be ready until 2018. Following several failed efforts by Congress to pass an alternative to the ACA, Trump issued another executive order in October 2017, the Executive Order to Promote Healthcare Choice and Competition, which some proponents and opponents asserted effectively replaced the ACA with a new healthcare regime.

Executive Order 13765 was formally revoked by President Joe Biden on January 28, 2021.

== Provisions ==
The order was designed to weaken regulations and procedures associated with enforcement of the Patient Protection and Affordable Care Act. It was broken into six sections:

- An attempt to seek efficient implementation of the law, focused on removing regulatory burdens during the repeal of the law.
- The United States Secretary of Health and Human Services and heads of other U.S. executive departments should waive, defer, grant exemptions or delay implementation any requirements of the act that would place fiscal burdens on any State or a cost, fee, tax, penalty, or regulatory burden on individuals, families, healthcare providers, health insurers, patients, recipients of healthcare services, purchasers of health insurance, or makers of medical devices, products, or medications.
- Those department heads are also ordered to grant greater flexibility to states seeking to implement healthcare programs.
- Seeking an open market across state lines in the healthcare market.
- Compliance with the Administrative Procedure Act regarding implementation of the regulatory revisions within this executive order.
- The order does not impact the Office of Management and Budget and its work, does not impact the legal authority of any department head of a U.S. federal agency and does not grant any specific rights to anyone within the United States.

== Effects ==
In February 2017, it was reported that the Internal Revenue Service would not require tax filers to state whether they had compliant insurance, allowing them to avoid the penalty fine. The IRS said that this change would reduce administrative burdens on taxpayers. It was criticized for weakening an enforcement mechanism that lowers premiums by supporting wide participation in the markets.

== See also ==
- Executive Order 13813
- List of executive actions by Donald Trump
- 2017 Patient Protection and Affordable Care Act replacement proposals
