= Senior Medicare Patrols =

Volunteer organization that assists with Medicare & Medicaid fraud

The Senior Medicare Patrols (SMP) are a group of volunteer organizations funded by the United States Department of Health and Human Services, which educate U.S. senior citizens on how to prevent, detect, and report Medicare and Medicaid fraud, error, and abuse. From the program's start in 1997 through December 2019, SMP projects and staff have recovered about $129 million in Medicare and Medicaid funds, and between 2016 through 2019, the program led 107,000 group education sessions and reached an estimated 6.5 million people through community education events. SMP has trained over 30,000 volunteers and received more than 300,000 complaints for investigation. Further, but untrackable, reductions in fraud and error likely occur because of beneficiaries' increased scrutiny of their bills.

In August 2020, the Administration for Community Living awarded funding to the Northeast Iowa Area Agency on Aging to act as the Senior Medicare Patrol National Resource Center (SMPNRC). Planned initiatives include maintenance of the public facing website and a mobile application.

== See also ==
- Medicare fraud
