= Pre-existing condition =

Medical condition that started before a person's health benefits went into effect

In the context of healthcare in the United States, a pre-existing condition is a medical condition that existed before a person's health insurance went into effect. Before 2014, some insurance policies would not cover expenses due to pre-existing conditions. These exclusions by the insurance industry were intended to mitigate adverse selection by potential customers. Such exclusions have been prohibited since January 1, 2014, by the Patient Protection and Affordable Care Act.

According to the Kaiser Family Foundation, more than a quarter of adults below the age of 65 (approximately 52 million people) had pre-existing conditions in 2016.

== Definitions ==
The University of Pittsburgh Medical Center defines a pre-existing condition as a "medical condition that occurred before a program of health benefits went into effect". J. James Rohack, president of the American Medical Association, has stated on a Fox News Sunday interview that exclusions, based upon these conditions, function as a form of "rationing" of health care.

Conditions can be broken down into two further categories, according to Lisa Smith of Investopedia:

Most insurance companies use one of two definitions to identify such conditions. Under the "objective standard" definition, a pre-existing condition is any condition for which the patient has already received medical advice or treatment prior to enrollment in a new medical insurance plan. Under the broader, "prudent person" definition, a pre-existing condition is anything for which symptoms were present and a prudent person would have sought treatment.

Which definition may be used was sometimes regulated by state laws. Some states required insurance companies to use the objective standard, while others required the prudent person standard. 10 states did not specify either definition, 21 required the "prudent person" standard, and 18 required the "objective" standard.

According to the Kaiser Family Foundation, more than a quarter of adults below the age of 65 (approximately 52 million people) had pre-existing conditions in 2016.

== Current U.S. federal regulation ==
Patient Protection and Affordable Care Act (Pub.L. 111–148) enacted March 23, 2010

- Immediate reform: effective June 21, 2010 (90 days after enactment)
  - National high-risk pool for individuals with a pre-existing condition who have been uninsured for the prior 6 months
    - Premium to be set at a standard rate for a standard population
    - Premium for older individuals allowed to be up to 4 times the premium for younger individuals
    - Premium for tobacco users allowed to be up to 1.5 times the premium for non-tobacco users
- Immediate reform: effective September 23, 2010 (6 months after enactment)
  - Group health insurance plans and new (non-grandfathered) individual health insurance plans
    - Pre-existing condition exclusions prohibited for children under age 19
- Reform delayed for 4 years: effective January 1, 2014
  - Individual and group health insurance plans
    - Pre-existing condition exclusions prohibited in all health insurance plans
    - Prohibit treating acts of domestic violence as a pre-existing condition
    - Waiting period for enrollment in new health insurance plans limited to 90 days
  - Grandfathered existing health insurance plans must prohibit pre-existing condition exclusions by January 1, 2014

== Former regulation ==
Regulation of pre-existing condition exclusions in individual (non-group) and small group (2 to 50 employees) health insurance plans in the United States was left to individual U.S. states as a result of the McCarran–Ferguson Act of 1945 which delegated insurance regulation to the states and the Employee Retirement Income Security Act of 1974 (ERISA) which exempted self-insured large group health insurance plans from state regulation. After most states had by the early 1990s implemented some limits on pre-existing condition exclusions by small group (2 to 50 employees) health insurance plans, the Health Insurance Portability and Accountability Act of 1996 (HIPAA; Kennedy–Kassebaum Act) extended some minimal limits on pre-existing condition exclusions for all group health insurance plans—including the self-insured large group health insurance plans that cover half of those with employer-provided health insurance but are exempt from state insurance regulation.

Individual (non-group) health insurance plans

- Maximum pre-existing condition exclusion period (states that permitted elimination riders permanently excluding pre-existing conditions noted by italics and asterisk*)
  - 6 months: Massachusetts, Oregon; New Mexico*
  - 9 months: Washington; New Hampshire*
  - 12 months: California, Idaho, Kentucky, Maine, Michigan, New Jersey, New York, Vermont; Colorado*, Connecticut*, Maryland*, Mississippi*, Montana*, North Carolina*, North Dakota*, Ohio*, Pennsylvania*, Rhode Island*, South Dakota*, Utah*, Virginia*, West Virginia*, Wyoming*
  - 18 months: Minnesota
  - 2 years: Alabama*, Florida*, Georgia*, Illinois*, Iowa*, Kansas*, South Carolina*, Tennessee*, Texas*, Wisconsin*
  - 3 years: Hawaii*
  - 10 years: Indiana
  - unlimited: Alaska*, Arizona*, Arkansas*, Delaware*, District of Columbia*, Louisiana*, Missouri*, Nebraska*, Nevada*, Oklahoma*
  - Elimination riders permanently excluding pre-existing conditions
    - prohibited: California, Idaho, Indiana, Kentucky, Maine, Massachusetts, Michigan, Minnesota, New Jersey, New York, Oregon, Vermont, Washington
    - permitted*: 37 other states and DC
- Maximum look-back period for pre-existing conditions
  - 3 months: New Hampshire
  - 6 months: Idaho, Kentucky, Massachusetts, Michigan, Minnesota, Nevada, New Jersey, New Mexico, New York, North Dakota, Ohio, Oregon, Utah, Washington, Wyoming
  - 12 months: California, Colorado, Connecticut, Indiana, Louisiana, Maine, Maryland, Mississippi, North Carolina, South Dakota, Vermont, Virginia
  - 2 years: Florida, Illinois, West Virginia
  - 3 years: Montana, Rhode Island,
  - 5 years: Alabama, Arkansas, Delaware, Iowa, Pennsylvania, Texas
  - unlimited: Alaska, Arizona, District of Columbia, Georgia, Hawaii, Kansas, Missouri, Nebraska, Oklahoma, South Carolina, Tennessee, Wisconsin

Small group (2 to 50 employees) health insurance plans

- Maximum pre-existing condition exclusion period
  - 0 months: Hawaii, Maryland, Michigan
  - 3 months: Kansas
  - 6 months: California, Colorado, Massachusetts, New Jersey, New Mexico, Oregon, Rhode Island
  - 9 months: Indiana, New Hampshire, Washington
  - 12 months: 36 other states + DC
- Maximum look-back period for pre-existing conditions
  - 0 months: Hawaii, Maryland, Michigan
  - 3 months: Kansas, New Hampshire
  - 6 months: 45 other states + DC

Large group (self-insured) health insurance plans

- Maximum pre-existing condition exclusion period
  - 12 months: 50 states + DC
- Maximum look-back period for pre-existing conditions
  - 6 months: 50 states + DC

Pre-existing condition exclusions were prohibited for HIPAA-eligible individuals (those with 18 months continuous coverage unbroken for no more than 63 days and coming from a group health insurance plan).

Individual (non-group) health insurance plans could exclude maternity coverage for a pre-existing condition of pregnancy.

Group health insurance plans sponsored by employers with 15 or more employees were prohibited by the Pregnancy Discrimination Act of 1978 from excluding maternity coverage for a pre-existing condition of pregnancy; this prohibition was extended to all group health insurance plans by the Health Insurance Portability and Accountability Act of 1996 (HIPAA).

== Practice and effect ==
Advocates against pre-existing condition rules argue that they cruelly deny people in need of treatment. State Farm spokeswoman K.C. Eynatten has said, "We realized our position was based on gut feelings, not hard numbers... we became aware that we were part of the reason a woman and her children might not leave an abuser. They were afraid they'd lose their insurance. And we wanted no part of that." Jerry Flanagan, health-care policy director of Consumer Watchdog, has stated that "insurance companies want premiums without any risk" and go to extreme "lengths... to go to make a profit". InsureMe, an insurance quote provider website, has argued that even though health insurance is basically to protect people from very high costs of health care, the commercial health insurance system is not playing fair and are always trying to avoid risk in order to boost their profits.

Some practices by some health insurance companies, such as determining domestic violence to be an excludable pre-existing condition, have been called abuses by Maria Tchijov, a Service Employees International Union new media coordinator, and by an Office of Rural Health Policy report.

The rationale behind pre-existing condition clauses, according to those who defend the policies, is that they reduce the cost of health insurance coverage for those who still receive it, thus giving more people an opportunity to afford insurance in the first place. The San Francisco Chronicle has reported that "[c]osts for those with coverage could go up because people in poor health who'd been shut out of the insurance pool would now be included... they would get medical care they could not access before." Senator Mike Enzi, a Republican from Wyoming, has voted to allow insurance companies to consider domestic violence as a pre-existing condition and supported his vote by saying that covering such people could raise insurance premiums to the point where it would preclude others from buying it. He has remarked that "If you have no insurance, it doesn't matter what services are mandated by the state".

According to the California-based advocacy group Consumer Watchdog, other possible situations falling under pre-existing condition clauses are chronic conditions as acne, hemorrhoids, toenail fungus, allergies, tonsillitis, and bunions, hazardous occupations such as police officer, stunt person, test pilot, circus worker, and firefighter, and pregnancy and/or the intention to adopt.

== Commentary by lawmakers ==
According to a libertarian opinion blog on Reason.com by Peter Suderman, the 'Pledge to America' issued by the Republican Party in September 2010 stated, "Health care should be accessible for all, regardless of pre-existing conditions or past illnesses.... We will make it illegal for an insurance company to deny coverage to someone with prior coverage on the basis of a pre-existing condition." In a March 3, 2010, address, President Barack Obama said that coverage denied to those with pre-existing conditions is a serious problem that would only grow worse without major reforms. In a September 2010 visit with Falls Church, Virginia, residents, Obama referred to a woman with an eye condition and a woman with non-Hodgkin's lymphoma as personal examples in the audience of those benefiting from changing pre-existing condition rules.

== Public opinion ==
A Time-Abt SRBI poll in late July 2009 found that a large majority of Americans (80%) favored a requirement that insurance companies insure people even if they have pre-existing conditions.

In September 2009, the monthly Kaiser Health Tracking Poll report said:

The public's most unanimous and bipartisan support is saved for a proposal to have the federal government require that health insurance companies cover anyone who applies, even if he/she has a pre-existing condition. Overall, eight in ten back the proposal, including 67 percent of Republicans, 80 percent of political independents and 88 percent of Democrats.

== See also ==
- Pre-existing Condition Insurance Plan
