= Science for the People =

American organization

Science for the People (SftP) is a left-wing organization that emerged from the antiwar culture of the United States in the late 1960s. Since 2014 it has experienced a revival focusing primarily on the dual nature of science. The organization advocates for a scientific establishment that is not isolated from society, rather one that uses scientific discoveries to advocate for and advance social justice and critically approach science as a social endeavor.

== History ==
The original group was composed of professors, students, workers, and other concerned citizens who sought to end potential oppression brought on by pseudoscience, or by what it considered the misuse of science. SftP generated much controversy in the 1970s for the radical tactics of some of its members. Over the initial few years there was an emergence of multiple differing opinions about the nature and mission of SftP should be. A faction wanted SftP to pay special attention to scientific issues that support class struggle. Another wanted to develop "a science for the people." The majority, however, wanted to be the scientific community's critical conscience and expose, from within, the dangers of the misuse of science. After a bitter internal struggle and departure of many, the group that remained focused its efforts, primarily through its magazine, on criticism of scientific misuse. During this time it became identified with prominent academic scientists such as Stephen Jay Gould and Richard Lewontin.

== Relationship with the scientific establishment ==
In the first five years SftP became known in the US scientific community for its attempts at disrupting the American Association for the Advancement of Science (AAAS). SftP members considered the AAAS, the world’s largest association of scientists, aligned with the government and the ruling elite. SftP particularly decried what it considered AAAS' complicity in war, sexism, racism and capitalism. A specific focus of the activists was the scientific community's involvement in the Vietnam war. Some of the tactics use to disrupt the AAAS meetings were picketing, demonstrations, impromptu speeches and confrontational interruptions. These actions led to the arrest of several SftP activists in the early 1970s.

Prior to the formation of SftP and its radical activism against the scientific establishment similar attempts had taken place with other organizations. One notable example is University of California, Berkeley nuclear physicist Charles Schwartz's 1967 attempt to amend the American Physical Society's (APS) constitution to allow 1% of members to call for a vote on any social or scientific issue. His motion was defeated because APS members did not think the society should take a stance on social issues. Another instance is the petition physicists began to the APS not to hold its 1970 meeting in Chicago because of the police brutality at the Democratic National Convention in 1968. The APS Council polled members and upheld its decision to keep the meeting in Chicago.

In 1971 a proposed amendment to change the APS's mission statement to include the phrase "The Society...shall shun those activities which are judged to contribute harmfully to the welfare of mankind." was defeated.

In following years, thanks to the actions of dedicated activists such as Schwartz and Martin Perl and others, APS took certain steps towards social responsibility. These included the 1972 creation of the Committee on the Status of Women in Physics the 1979 boycott of states that had not ratified the Equal Rights Amendment (ERA) and the 1983 Arms Control Resolution. The latter was strongly criticized by George Keyworth, science advisor to president Ronald Reagan.

== Positions and views ==
Science for the People has positions in multiple different areas. It states on its website that it identifies as part of the "broader left."

=== Anti-militarism ===
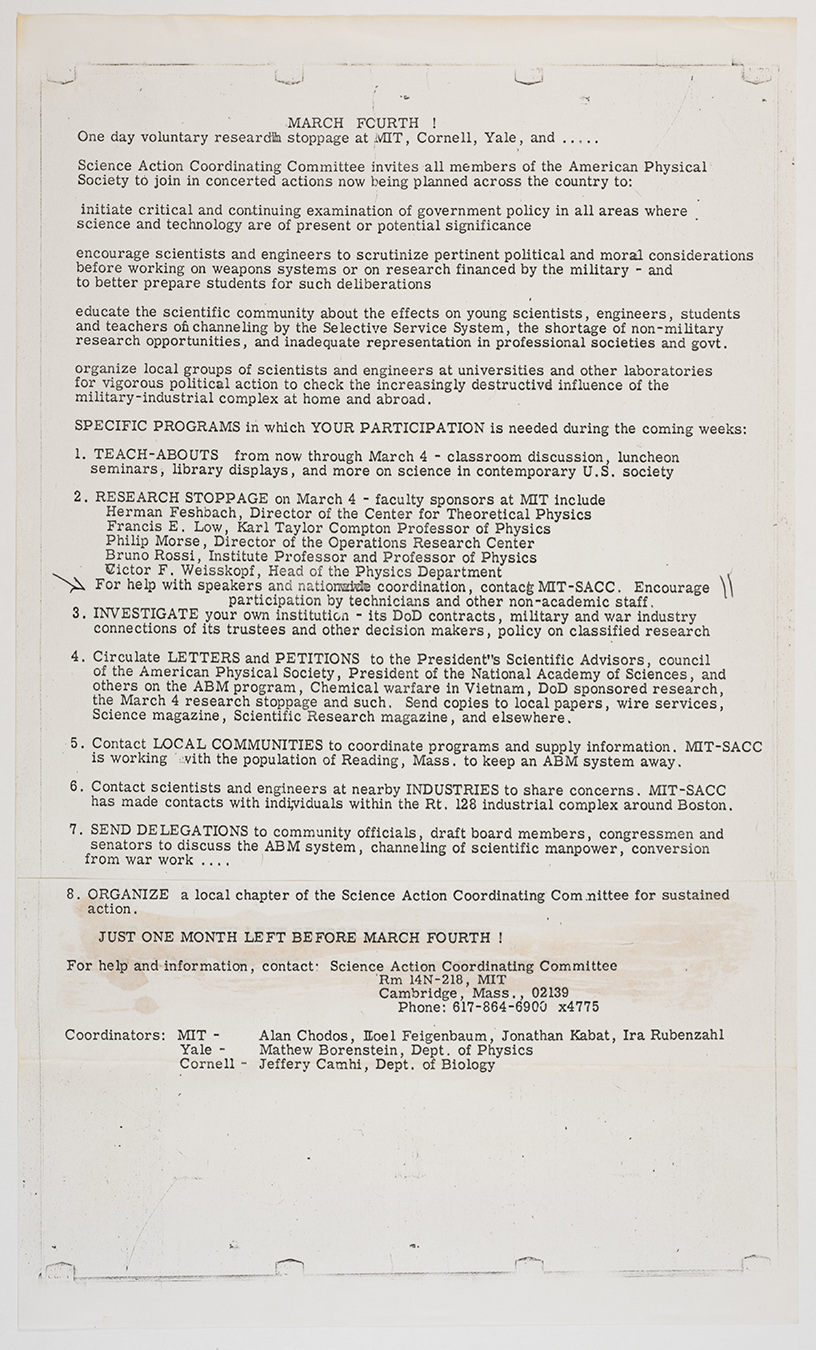
Statement by MIT scientists about the anti-war protest walkout on March 4, 1969

From its inception in January 1969 SftP opposed the involvement of scientists in the military. SftP also challenged the established notion that organizations such as the American Association for the Advancement of Science (AAAS) and the American Physical Society (APS) can stay neutral vis-à-vis the Vietnam war. Early on, a number of SftP scientists mobilized against US Congress' Anti-Ballistic Missile (ABM) Program, arguing that the ABM was not feasible and the funds would be better spent on basic scientific research. On March 4, 1969 MIT scientists staged a mass walkout in protest of the ABM.

In April 1969, Scientists and Engineers for Social and Political Action (SESPA), SftP's predecessor, held an orderly march of 250 physicists to the White House to protest the ABM.

This type of activism among scientists in the US led to the anti-ABM treaty of 1972 with the Soviet Union. In the 1980s SftP opposed president Reagan's attempt to revive the arms race with the Soviet Union as well as the US involvement in Nicaragua.

=== Position on nuclear energy ===
In the mid-70s SftP cautioned against the ways that nuclear power was being promoted as a safe and environmentally clean alternative to coal. In May 1976 the organization published a pamphlet arguing that the push for nuclear energy in the US over solar and other cleaner, cheaper alternatives benefitted the Atomic-Industrial complex and not the general public. In the 1980s, especially in the wake of such disasters as Three Mile Island, SftP questioned the environmental safety of nuclear energy and the toxic waste it produces.

=== Views on technology ===
Throughout the 1970s and 1980s SftP considered technology an important outcome of scientific advancement. The organization favored the more concrete nature of technological developments over purely intellectual exercise of theoretical science. Key to the group’s support for technology was the conviction that it should neither replace humans in the workplace nor harm the environment. SftP members advocated for research and development programs to be chosen based on equity and social need and not to meet the government's needs of economic and military security.

=== Position on science education ===
One of the core tenets of the SftP was that science and particularly biology and medicine cannot remain neutral. The organization not only believed that these disciplines should focus on correcting societal ills they also actively participated in educating people on work place hazards such as asbestos and other chemical and environmental exposures.

In the early 1970s a Boston several SftP members known as the Boston Science Teaching Group, published and distributed series of pamphlets on topics such as genetics and ecology. Other members who were professional educators volunteered to teach biology in Boston’s underserved school districts. In 1971 two university professors, Rita Arditti and Tom Strunk, in an attempt to reform college biology curriculum, created a socially conscious first year college course called "Objecting to Objectivity: A Course in Biology". The course covered genetic engineering, physical and social limitations and implications of human gene maps, polygenic inheritance and prenatal diagnosis. It also discussed reproduction, birth control and abortion including the contemporary research and public policies about reproductive health. Other topics included population growth and Malthusian and Marxist theories and ethics of human research.

=== Positions on race and gender ===
Advocating for racial and gender equality in science and medicine was one of the core tenets of SftP. The organization included multiple feminist members who were pioneering women in science. These included Arditti and other biologists such as Anne Fausto-Sterling, Freda Friedman Salzman, Ruth Hubbard, and author and activist Barbara Beckwith. Hubbard, for instance, was the first woman to attain tenure in biology at Harvard University. SftP also embraced the cause of gender equality in the society at large and advocated for reproductive rights, gender equality at the workplace and addressed issues surrounding sexuality. It also fought against domestic violence and traditional gender roles in family structure. While focusing on the world of science, feminist members of SftP faced an uphill battle in introducing gender parity for women in science at the universities. They also sought to change the discriminatory gender dynamics in academia and in laboratories.

SftP's efforts at promoting gender equality were paralleled with its efforts to promote racial and ethnic equality. Although made up primarily of white Americans, some SftP members maintained relations with the Black Panther Party. The two organizations urged the scientific community to create a free science program for black communities to enhance their scientific knowledge. The organization also criticized attacks on affirmative action and featured pieces by black and other minority scientists in its publication. It also uncovered occupational health hazards among black and ethnic minority workers both in the US and abroad and fought to improve workplace conditions to eliminate these risks. SftP's antiracist ideology put it at odds with the concepts of sociobiology and genetic determinism.

=== Criticism of sociobiology ===
Biologists within SftP were highly critical of sociobiology, because of objectionable premises to the organization of the discipline and for the implications of using sociobiology to support racism, capitalism, and imperialism. E. O. Wilson, a biologist and entomology professor in the Department of Organismic and Evolutionary Biology at Harvard University, whose 1975 book Sociobiology: The New Synthesis had helped start the debate, wrote that "the political objections forcefully made by the Sociobiology Study Group of Science for the People in particular took me by surprise."

SftP condemned the 1969 arguments that genetic differences were the underlying reason for differences in educational achievements between blacks and whites. SftP also took issue with the Harvard XYY study in 1975. The goal of the XYY study was to assess the risk of criminality the extra Y chromosome supposedly conferred. The SftP scientists pointed out the ethical and methodological failures of the above study, including open ended consents, stigmatization of individuals with XYY, lack of controls and absence of double blinding.

=== Positions on healthcare and medicine ===
Health care providers who were SftP members worked to strengthen healthcare infrastructure in underserved communities. They partnered with both the Black Panthers and Young Lords Organization to bring medical services to minorities, who often could not access the medical establishment both as practitioners and as patients. SftP joined with other New Left Health organizations such as Health Policy Advisory Center and Medical Committee for Human Rights, fought for a fair and just healthcare system and advocated for women’s reproductive rights.

SftP members, such as cancer researcher John Valentine at Wayne State University, exposed the capitalist interests that drove biomedical research. He argued that the 1971 National Cancer Act, signed by president Richard Nixon, failed to fund research into cancer causes such as poor preventative healthcare, occupational hazards and environmental exposures. He also criticized the use of public funds only to develop new chemotherapeutic agents instead of using some of it to minimize cancer risk due to workplace exposures and cancer-causing consumer products.

SftP biologists also opposed recombinant DNA (rDNA) research before its public health and environmental impact can be thoroughly elucidated. They also expressed concerns and, accurately, predicted that rDNA can commercialize biomedical research and make it a market commodity. They urged the scientific community and the general public to consider who decides what research gets done and who benefits from these decisions.

=== Views on agriculture and ecology ===
SftP argued that the existing contemporary agricultural models were neither benefitting the consumer, as food prices were rising astronomically, nor the farmer because their increasing debt without a raise in income. The primary benefiters were input and output capital enterprises such has fertilizer companies, insecticide and herbicide manufacturers and farm machinery companies. Members of the SftP formed the New World Agriculture Group (NWAG) that attempted to discover and develop ecologically rational alternative agricultural methods. Methods that protected the environment and preserved long-term productive capacity. NWAG also proposed partnering with farm labor organizations to help bring an end to worker exploitation and the unequal wealth distribution.

=== International relations ===
From its inception SftP condemned the use of technology and science to oppress and colonize other countries. The organization gave the examples of both Vietnam and Cuba where, it stated, the US technological and scientific superiority was being used to both militarily and economically repress the smaller nations. In response to the US policy, in 1971, a group of SftP members in Cambridge, Massachusetts collected and shipped large amounts of scientific books and journals to Vietnam and Cuba to aid in science education there. The same year, molecular biologist Dr. Mark Ptashne and zoologist Dr. Bert Pfeiffer went to Hanoi and lectured to Vietnamese scientists and physicians. There were also successful efforts of networking with scientists in China, and, in the 1980s, with the scientific and technological community in Nicaragua.

== 2014 revitalization ==
Since the fall of 2014, an effort to revive and reorganize SftP has been underway. The SftP revitalization efforts emerged from the convention held April 11–13, 2014, at the University of Massachusetts Amherst. At the 2014 conference various topics including the history of the SftP, health care, climate change, social justice, science education, gender and racial bias and militarization of science were discussed. Since then, inspired by the original 1970s-1980s group, this new formation has dedicated itself to building a social movement around progressive and radical perspectives on science and society.

Several local chapters of the SftP participated in the first annual March for Science on April 22, 2017. The revived SftP also published a statement titled "Which Way for Science?". The statement hailed the March for Science as "an exciting first step," but it also criticized the "apolitical" nature of the event and for their lack of attention to the experiences of scientists from historically marginalized groups such as women, people of color and others. "Which Way for Science" called attention to science's historic ties to U.S. capitalism and militarism, and called for a radical shift in its practice.

== 2018 National Convention ==
The national convention, held at the University of Michigan's Ann Arbor campus in February 2018, brought together close to one hundred scientists and activists to formalize the group's bylaws and structure. During the three days the attendees discussed the history and future of SftP, heard from local chapters that included representatives from Atlanta, Mexico City, New York and seven other North American locations. The organizational structure of SftP was explored and these discussions served as a guide to developing an inclusive, radical and democratic political movement for scientists and STEM workers. There were a dozen presentations on variety of topics related to SftP's mission.

In addition to the call to organize more local chapters a number of working groups was also developed during the meeting. These included groups dealing with Climate Change, Reproductive Justice, Science education and others. Plans to participate in the second annual March for Science on April 14, 2018, were also initiated at the convention.

=== Local chapters ===
- Ann Arbor
- Atlanta
- Boston
- Canada
- Knoxville
- Madison
- Mexico City
- New York City
- Urbana Champaign
- Washington, D.C.
- Western Massachusetts
- Twin Cities

== Magazine ==
From 1969 to 1989 the original SftP published a quarterly, then bimonthly, magazine, that has been digitized and available on the organization's website.

On July 28, 2018, at Caveat in New York City the publication was relaunched online with a special issue dedicated to geo-engineering. The event also featured the premiere of a documentary on the organization. The first regular issue of the relaunched magazine was published online and in print on May 1, 2019.

== Notable members ==
- Jon Beckwith
- Chandler Davis
- Anne Fausto-Sterling
- Douglas J. Futuyma
- Stephen Jay Gould
- Joseph L. Graves, Jr.
- William A. Haseltine
- David Himmelstein
- Ruth Hubbard
- Richard Levins
- Richard Lewontin
- Karen Messing
- David F. Noble
- Alvin Francis Poussaint
- James A. Shapiro
- John Vandermeer
- Joseph Weizenbaum
- Steffie Woolhandler

== See also ==
- Science Wars
- Evolutionary psychology controversy
- Nature versus nurture controversy
- Sociobiology Study Group
- British Society for Social Responsibility in Science
- New World Agriculture and Ecology Group
