= Bernard Lown =

American inventor and cardiologist (1921–2021)

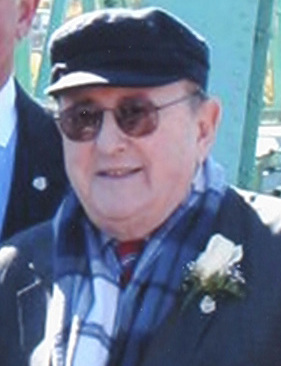
- Lown at the dedication of the Bernard Lown Peace Bridge, 2008
- Born: Boruch Lac; June 7, 1921; Utena, Lithuania
- Died: February 16, 2021 (aged 99); Chestnut Hill, Massachusetts, United States
- Citizenship: Lithuanian; American
- Education: University of Maine; Johns Hopkins University School of Medicine
- Known for: Developer of the defibrillator Co-founder of the International Physicians for the Prevention of Nuclear War
- Spouse: Louise Lown
- Scientific career
- Fields: Cardiologist, anti-nuclear war activist
- Workplaces: Harvard School of Public Health; Brigham and Women’s Hospital
- Doctoral advisor: Samuel A. Levine

Bernard Lown (June 7, 1921 – February 16, 2021) was a Lithuanian-American cardiologist and inventor. Lown was the original developer of the direct current defibrillator for cardiac resuscitation, and the cardioverter for correcting rapid disordered heart rhythms. He introduced a new use for the drug lidocaine to control heartbeat disturbances.

Throughout his medical career, Lown focused on two major medical challenges: the problem of sudden cardiac death and the role of psychological stress on the cardiovascular system. His investigations led to many medical break-throughs, among them the coronary care unit. His work made possible and safe much of modern cardiac surgery, as well as a host of other innovations. In 1985, Lown accepted the Nobel Peace Prize on behalf of the International Physicians for the Prevention of Nuclear War, an organization he co-founded with Soviet cardiologist Yevgeny Chazov, who later was Minister Of Health of the USSR.

Lown was Professor of Cardiology Emeritus at the Harvard T.H. Chan School of Public Health, and Senior Physician Emeritus at the Brigham and Women’s Hospital, Boston, Massachusetts. He was the founder of the Lown Cardiovascular Center and Lown Cardiovascular Research Foundation. He also founded the Lown Institute, which aims to reform both the healthcare system and society.

== Early life and education ==
Lown was born in Utena, Lithuania as Boruch Lac, on June 7, 1921, the son of Nison and Bela (Grossbard) Lac. His family was Jewish, and one of his grandfathers was a rabbi. They emigrated to Maine when Lown was 14, and he attended Lewiston High School, graduating in 1938.

Lown went on to study zoology at the University of Maine, obtaining a bachelor's degree from that institution in 1942. He subsequently earned an M.D. from Johns Hopkins University School of Medicine in 1945. His medical training included Yale-New Haven Hospital (Yale University, New Haven, Connecticut); Montefiore Medical Center, Bronx, NY; and a cardiology fellowship at the Peter Bent Brigham Hospital (now Brigham and Women’s Hospital, in Boston). His mentor in cardiology was the renowned clinical cardiologist Samuel A. Levine.

== Development of the defibrillator ==
Lown helped raise international medical awareness of sudden cardiac death as a leading cause of mortality in the developed world. Based on patient observations, Lown concluded that sudden cardiac death was reversible and survivable, and that people who were successfully resuscitated could have a near normal life expectancy.

Working with his mentor Samuel A. Levine, Lown realized that the high mortality of a heart attack, then 35 percent, was most likely due to a strict regimen of bed rest. Patients remained completely recumbent for six or more weeks. A major complication of bed rest was pulmonary embolism, which accounted for a significant part of the mortality. Although Lown encountered enormous opposition and hostility among doctors to the so-called "chair treatment", in 81 patients so treated, mortality was reduced by two thirds. Once the work was published, the chair treatment was rapidly adopted and hospitalizations were reduced to several days. Untold lives were saved by getting patients out of bed.

Until the 1950s, ventricular fibrillation of the heart was treated with drug therapy alone. In 1956 American cardiologist Paul Zoll described resuscitations during open-heart surgery and, later after sudden cardiac death, by means of an alternating current (AC) electric shock, derived from a wall socket. AC current was untested as to its safety and efficacy and could cause death. In 1959, Lown demonstrated that AC was injurious to the heart and could be lethal. These investigations were conducted in the Department of Nutrition at the Harvard School of Public Health. The work was supported by Professor Frederick Stare, chairman of the Department of Nutrition.

To find a safer method of cardiac resuscitation, Lown enlisted the help of Barouh Berkovits, an electrical engineer employed by American Optical Company (AO). In their experimental work, Lown focused on two objectives: safety and efficacy. Alternating current caused burns in skeletal and heart muscle and induced atrial as well as ventricular fibrillation in a large majority of the animal experiments.

During a year of intense experimentation, in 1961 Lown and coworkers proved that a specific direct current (DC) waveform consistently reversed ventricular fibrillation, restoring a normal heart beat without injuring heart or skeletal muscle. This became widely known as the "Lown waveform." It facilitated the worldwide acceptance of the defibrillator and cardioverter and improved survival of patients with coronary heart disease.

The DC defibrillator provided a new approach for resuscitating patients and paved the way for new possibilities in cardiac surgery. The Lown clinical group were the first to use the defibrillator and cardioverter at Peter Bent Brigham Hospital. Donald B. Effler was the first cardiac surgeon to use the DC defibrillator in 1962 at the Cleveland Clinic. According to Effler, this advance made possible modern cardiac surgery. Indeed, in 1967, Rene Favoloro performed what is regarded as the first coronary artery bypass operation in Effler’s surgical department at Cleveland Clinic. DC defibrillation provided a safe way to restore a normal heart rhythm during the surgical bypass of obstructed coronary arteries.

Lown went on to investigate the possibilities of the defibrillator to treat non-life-threatening tachycardias. He discovered that timing the electrical discharge outside the heart’s brief vulnerable period of 0.03 seconds in duration prevented ventricular fibrillation or sudden cardiac death. He called this method of timed DC discharge "Cardioversion." The cardioverter and DC defibrillator were especially valuable in coronary care units, when patients are hospitalized when most susceptible to sudden cardiac death and other potentially malignant arrhythmias.

In addition to advancing medical technology, Lown discovered new applications for two drugs that were widely used for cardiac problems: digitalis and lidocaine. Until the 1950s, digitalis poisoning was a major cause of fatality among patients with congestive heart failure. During a medical residency at the Montefiore Hospital in New York City, Lown demonstrated the critical role of potassium in determining the safe use of digitalis. His discovery led to abandonment of long acting digitalis drugs like digitoxin. Instead, the short acting digitalis glycoside gained universal acceptance. Lown also focused medical attention on potassium loss with the use of various diuretics.

In 1964, Lown introduced a new use for the drug lidocaine to control ventricular disordered heart rhythms. Lidocaine was also used in coronary units to prevent the need for resuscitation. Previously, lidocaine was used almost exclusively by dentists as an anesthetic agent.

== Fiber optics ==
In 1957, Lown was concerned with how to visualize an atherosclerotic aortic plaque occurring in the big coronary vessels that supply nutrients to the heart muscle. It was his hope that visualizing this would lead to discovering how to treat and prevent heart attacks and sudden cardiac death. A discussion with a close friend, Elias Snitzer, a physicist at Massachusetts Institute of Technology, led to an introduction to Michael Polanyi, a physicist with American Optical Company. At the time, Polanyi was working on fiber optics. Lown received a grant from the Hartford Foundation to pursue fiber optics. However, optical technology was inadequate at the time, so this line of research was discontinued. Lown's work did show that, with fiber optics, it was possible to measure oxygen saturation in dogs, and determine the cardiac output in humans.

Paradoxically, when Lown submitted two abstracts to the World Cardiology Conference in Mexico in 1964, one on the defibrillator and cardioversion, and one dealing with fiber optics, the former was rejected and the latter accepted.

== Peace activism ==
=== Physicians for Social Responsibility (PSR) ===
In early 1961, Lown called together a group of physicians from Boston’s teaching hospitals to address the mounting threat of nuclear war between the USSR and the USA. This political subject had not been addressed previously by physicians in the United States. The new organization called itself Physicians for Social Responsibility (PSR).

Among the activist participants were Jack Geiger and Victor W. Sidel. By the end of 1961, the group had drafted five research articles about the medical consequences of a ten-megaton nuclear attack on the city of Boston, a magnitude considered both possible and likely by the U.S. military. The series, "The Medical Consequences of Thermonuclear War", was published as a symposium in the New England Journal of Medicine in May 1962.

These articles encouraged anti-nuclear medical movements worldwide. Additionally, they helped pass the Limited Test Ban Treaty in the U.S. Senate.

=== Committee of Responsibility for War Injured Vietnamese Children (COR) ===
Lown was also involved in organizing COR, the Committee of Responsibility to Save War Burned and War Injured Children, of which he was a leading member. This organization aimed to bring injured and burned Vietnamese children for treatment in the United States, in order "to bring the war home."

COR was headed by Herbert Needelman. It arranged for several American hospitals to treat injured Vietnamese children for free. John Constable III, from the Shriner Burn Center of the Massachusetts General Hospital in Boston, was among the first physicians to participate. He and other physicians traveled numerous times to Vietnam to choose children with injuries that could be treated.

This mission could not be accomplished without ambulance planes ferrying the very sick children. Lown led a delegation to Washington for a meeting with William F. Bundy, then Assistant Secretary of State. He was persuaded to support the objective of COR. In 1967 the Pentagon began to transport Vietnamese children to the USA.

=== International Physicians for the Prevention of Nuclear War (IPPNW) ===
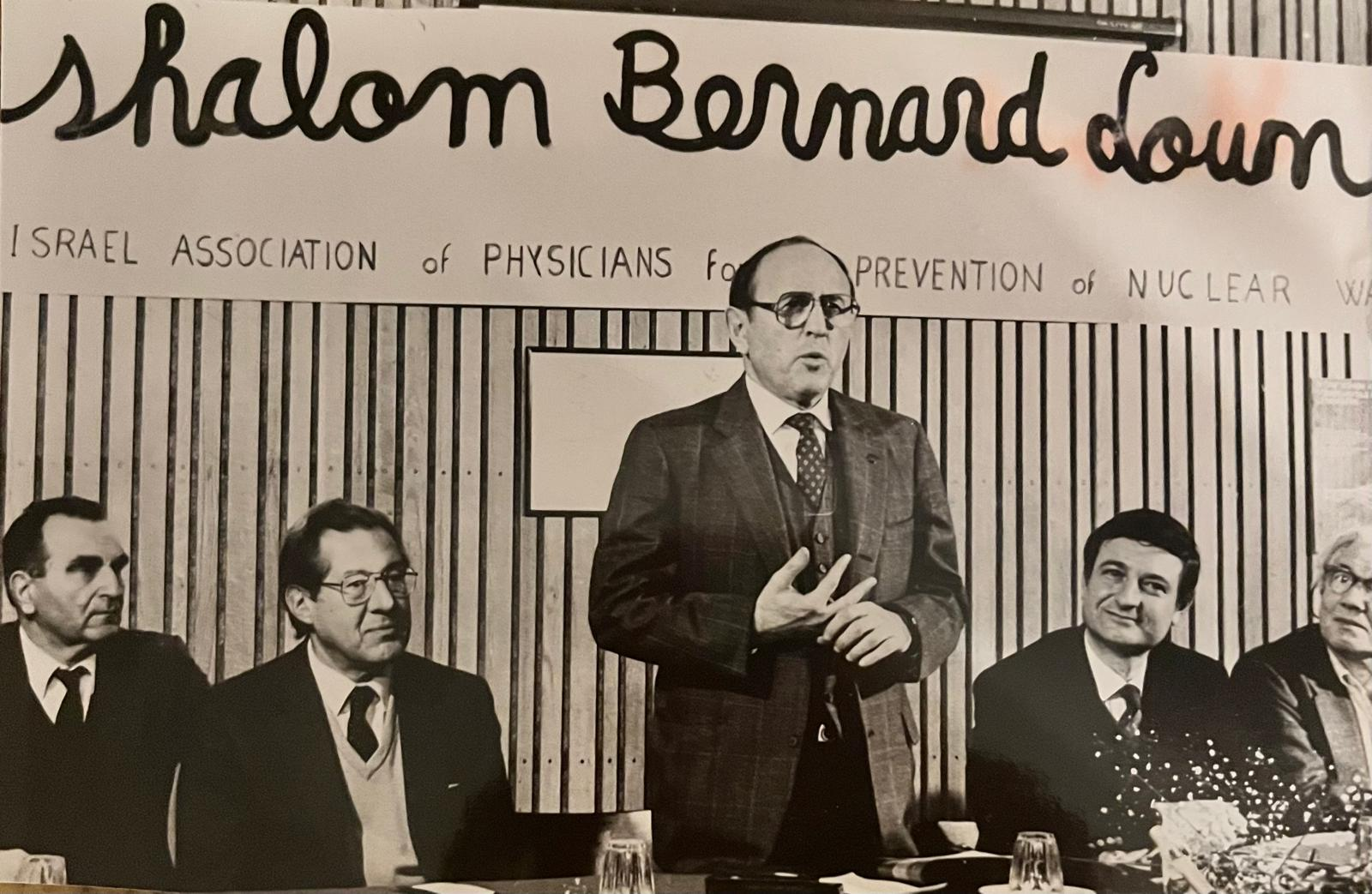
Meeting of the Israeli Branch of the IPPNW held on January 29, 1986 at Hebrew University, Israel, showing Lown in the center, Ernesto Kahan to his immediate right and Eliyahu Stoupel to the far left.

In 1980, Lown called on a small number of doctors to organize against the mounting nuclear threat that followed USSR's invasion of Afghanistan and the election of the Reagan administration. This small group of physicians, with the help largely of first-year Harvard medical students, formed the International Physicians for the Prevention of Nuclear War (IPPNW).

This IPPNW could not have been founded without the intimate friendship between Eugene Chazov and Lown. Both cardiologists, they had collaborated in researching the issue of sudden cardiac death, sponsored by the National Heart and Lung Institute.

Lown headed the American Sudden Death Task Force, while Chazov headed the Soviet group of cardiologists. Frequent visits to the USSR with American cardiological colleagues promoted dialogue and understanding between physicians of the two hostile countries. They laid the groundwork for the IPPNW and made it possible. These events are described in Lown's memoir Prescription for Survival: A Doctor's Journey to End Nuclear Madness.

The first IPPNW annual World Congress was held at Arlie House, Virginia, in 1981. Eighty medical leaders from twelve countries attended.

In 1982, the 2nd IPPNW Congress took place in Cambridge, England, with over 400 participants. Among the American participants were astrophysicist and science populizer Carl Sagan; Admiral Noel Gayler, formerly head of the American Pacific Fleet, Director of the National Security Agency, and in charge of targeting nuclear weapons against he USSR; Howard Hiatt, Dean of the Harvard School of Public Health; and Herbert Abrams, head of Radiology at the Harvard Medical School. Equally distinguished participants attended from the UK, Germany, and Scandinavian countries.

A major breakthrough for IPPNW was arranged by Eugene Chazov in 1982 when three Soviet physicians and three American physicians appeared on a nationwide Soviet television network. The Soviet participants were Chazov, Michael Kuzin, and Leonid Ilyin; while the Americans were Lown, James Muller, and John Pastore. During this unprecedented telecast an audience of 100 million Soviet viewers heard for the first time an unedited discussion of the consequences of nuclear war. The program was later broadcast in the US.

By 1985, IPPNW represented 135,000 physicians in 60 countries.

In December of that year, Lown and Chazov accepted the 1985 Nobel Peace Prize on behalf of IPPNW. Shortly thereafter, Soviet leader Mikhail Gorbachev invited IPPNW Co-presidents Lown and Chazov for a meeting in the Kremlin. The lengthy discussion covered a host of issues. Discussed was Gorbachev's unilateral moratorium on nuclear weapons testing, the arrest and detention of Nobel Laureate physicist Andrei Sakharov in the city of Gorky, the north–south divide, and other important subjects.

== International public health work ==
=== SatelLife and ProCor ===
Two organizations founded by Lown, SatelLife (1988) and ProCor (1997) were designed to aid physicians in developing countries by connecting them to relevant information on cardiovascular disease and its prevention. Their focus was on global inequities in healthcare and leveraging technology to promote health equality.

SatelLife employed low earth-orbit satellites that circumnavigated the poles and were capable of reaching every point on earth four times daily. They provided access to medical literature to health professionals in developing countries.

ProCor created an internet network of health workers in developing countries around the world. This internet-based community enabled physicians and health workers to access relevant and reliable medical information about cardiovascular disease. The focus was on disease prevention. It also offered an email-based forum for discussion.

ProCor’s global outreach included The Ashanti-ProCor Project, launched in 2006, which was designed to assess cardiovascular disease knowledge and practice among health workers in the Ashanti Region of Ghana, identify those who can play a key role in prevention, and explore their information needs as a way to better address the needs of physicians in the developing world.

=== Ad Hoc Committee to Defend Healthcare ===
In 1996, Lown, with Stephanie Woolhandler and David Himmelstein of the Cambridge City Hospital; Jerry Avorn, head of Pharmacoepidemiology at the Harvard Medical School; and Susan Bennett, a primary care physician at Massachusetts General Hospital formed the Ad Hoc Committee to Defend Healthcare. Many health workers joined the Ad Hoc Committee, the objective of which was to promote a single-payer healthcare system in Massachusetts

In 1997, a letter signed by over 2000 Massachusetts physicians and published in The Journal of the American Medical Association outlined the need for single-payer healthcare. The Ad Hoc Committee canvassed people throughout the state of Massachusetts to gain the 100,000 names necessary to put the issue on the ballot.

The issue was put to referendum in Massachusetts in 2000. In spite of opposition, the referendum showed 45% of voters in favor of single-payer healthcare.

=== The Lown Institute and the Right Care Alliance ===
In 2012, the Lown Cardiovascular Research Foundation was renamed The Lown Institute. The Lown Institute addresses the growing crisis in healthcare in the US, marked by overtreatment, undertreatment, and mistreatment through research, clinical programs, and convenings. The Institute holds an annual conference where the newest research on overuse and underuse is presented, and where like-minded clinicians and patient advocates can share ideas. It also sponsors clinical programs to address overuse, such as the Right Care Educators program, Right Care Rounds, and the Right Care Vignette Competition. The Lown Institute is currently conducting research on risk-adjustment methods for evaluating patient outcomes.

Among participants in the leadership of The Lown Institute are Nassib Chamoun, Vikas Saini, Shannon Brownlee, Thomas Graboys, Professor Joseph Brain, Patricia Gabow, Elizabeth Gilbertson, James Joslin, Aretha Davis, David Bor, Michael Fine, and Breck Eagle.

The Lown Institute awards the Shkreli Awards named after Martin Shkreli for "worst examples of profiteering and dysfunction in health care". In 2020 it was awarded to the Trump administration’s federal personal protective equipment (PPE) taskforce.

The Right Care Alliance (RCA) is the sister organization of The Lown Institute and the advocacy wing. The Right Care Alliance brings together clinicians, patients, and community members in a grassroots movement advocating for a universally accessible, affordable, safe, and effective healthcare system. The RCA is organized into specialty councils and regional chapters that organize on topics specific to their specialty or region. The RCA holds an annual week of action, during which members organize activities to demonstrate compassionate, patient-centered care, such as engaging the broader community in listening and storytelling.

In 2018 the organization started analyzing data about 3,200 hospitals to access performance in terms of racial inclusivity and health equity. The resulting report was released in 2021.

== Personal life ==
Lown married Louise Lown, a cousin of his, in 1946. They remained married until her death in 2019. Together, they had three children: Anne, Fredric, and Naomi.

Lown died on February 16, 2021, at his home in Chestnut Hill, Massachusetts. He was 99, and suffered from congestive heart failure and pneumonia prior to his death.

== Awards and honors ==
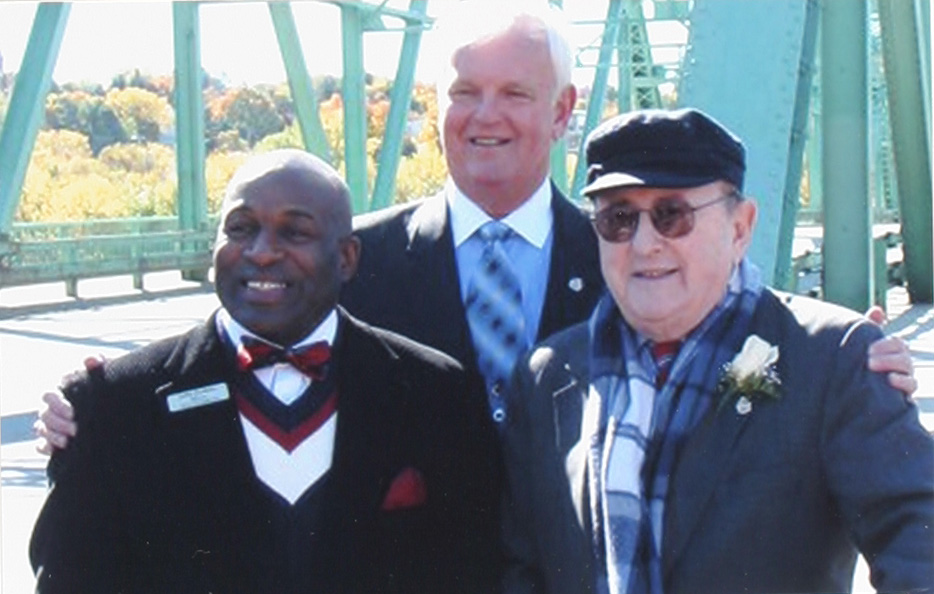
Dedication of the Bernard Lown Peace Bridge in October 2008. Rightmost: Bernard Lown

Lown has received numerous awards including the Golden Door Award from the International Institute of Boston; the Dr. Paul Dudley White Award from the American Heart Association; the Distinguished Emeritus Professor from Harvard School of Public Health; the Distinguished Medical Alumnus Award by Johns Hopkins School of Medicine; and the highest honor from the country of Lithuania: the Cross of Commander of the Order of the Lithuanian Grand Duke Gediminas, the Gandhi Peace Award, and the first Cardinal Medeiros Peace Award, as well as 21 honorary degrees from universities both in the United States and abroad. In 1993, he delivered the Indira Gandhi Memorial Lecture in New Delhi.

The bridge that connects the cities of Lewiston and Auburn in Maine was renamed The Bernard Lown Peace Bridge upon an act by the state legislature that was signed into law by Governor John Baldacci in 2008.

The Brigham and Women's Hospital in 2009 established the Bernard Lown Educational award. The recipient is selected by staff and students.

The International Physicians for the Prevention of Nuclear War, which Lown co-founded, won the 1985 Nobel Peace Prize.

=== Honors from the Harvard School of Public Health ===
The Lown Scholars Program at the Harvard School of Public Health aims to assist promising health professionals who live and work in low- and middle-income countries. "[The program] is designed to create an international cadre of talented health professionals [...] who will use public health tools and strategies to prevent cardiovascular disease and promote cardiac health."

=== The Lown Visiting Professor ===
In 2012, a visiting Professorship was established whose function is to coordinate the courses afforded to the Lown Scholars as well as help promote cardiovascular preventative programs in low- and middle-income countries.

== Lown bibliography ==
- Lown B, Levine SA: Current Advances in Digitalis Therapy. Boston: Little, Brown and Co., 1954.
- Lown B, Levine HD: Atrial Arrhythmias, Digitalis and Potassium. New York: Landberger Medical Books, 1958.
- Vikhert AM, Lown B: Sudden Death (in Russian). Moscow: Medithinya, 1982.
- Lown B, Malliani A, Prosdocimi M (eds.): Neural Mechanisms and Cardiovascular Disease. Padova, Italy: Liviana Press, 1986.
- Lown, B: To Heal a Sick Planet. Hiroshima, Japan: Chugoku Shimbun, 1991.
- Lown B: Never Whisper in the Presence of Wrong. Cambridge, MA: International Physicians for the Prevention of Nuclear War, 1993.
- Lown B: Practicing the Art While Mastering the Science. Brookline, MA: Lown Cardiovascular Research Foundation, 1995.
- The Lost Art of Healing. Boston, MA, and New York: Houghton Mifflin Company. 1996. ISBN 9780395825259 – via Internet Archive.
- Prescription for Survival: A Doctor's Journey to End Nuclear Madness. San Francisco: Berrett-Koehler Publishers, Inc. 2008. ISBN 9781576754825 – via Internet Archive.
- Lown B: Tributes to a Teacher: Clinical Pearls. Lown Cardiovascular Research Foundation. Brookline, MA, 2008.
