= David Scheiner =

American physician and activist

- Born: David Lawrence Scheiner; 1938 (age 87–88)
- Citizenship: US
- Education: Princeton University; Columbia University
- Known for: Advocacy for single-payer health care
- Scientific career
- Fields: Internal medicine
- Workplaces: Physicians for a National Health Program; HydePark Associates; University of Chicago Hospitals; Rush University Medical Center

David Scheiner (born 1938) is an American physician and activist, noted for his efforts in advocating for single-payer health care in the United States. He was United States President Barack Obama's personal physician from 1987 till 2008 while he was based in Chicago, and is a leading member of Physicians for a National Health Program (PNHP).

== Education and practice ==
Scheiner graduated from Princeton University and gained his M.D. degree from Columbia University's College of Physicians and Surgeons, subsequent to which he practiced internal medicine in Chicago for over 40 years with Hyde Park Associates, where his partner was Quentin Young, who had been personal physician to Martin Luther King Jr. and has also similarly been instrumental in advocating single-payer health care, despite lack of qualifications in healthcare economics. He practiced in Hyde Park and worked for University of Chicago Hospitals and Rush University Medical Center. He retired in 2014.

== Advocacy for health care ==
Scheiner has been a leading advocate of the single-payer health care system since its beginnings, along with his partner and good friend Quentin Young. In August 2009, Scheiner appeared on numerous television and media outlets, including CNN's Larry King Live, hosted by Wolf Blitzer, and HBO's Real Time with Bill Maher, hosted by Bill Maher, appearing as a proponent of a single-payer government health system, in view of the recent debate surrounding U.S. health care reforms proposed by President Obama, whose health care plans he termed as being too "timid". During his appearance on Larry King Live on August 11, 2009, when he headlined that day's episode, he discussed the issue with Blitzer and other commentators, including former Republican Party presidential candidate Ron Paul and Dean Ornish, stating how health insurance companies had interfered in the treatment of several of his patients and advocating usage of the single-payer system.
