= Quentin Young =

American physician (1923–2016)

Quentin David Young
- Born: September 5, 1923; Chicago, Illinois
- Died: March 7, 2016 (aged 92); Berkeley, California
- Education: Hyde Park High School, University of Chicago
- Occupation: Physician

Quentin David Young (September 5, 1923 – March 7, 2016) was an American physician who was recognized for his efforts in advocating for single-payer health care in the United States. An activist who opposed the Vietnam War and worked on the Civil Rights Movement, Young was best known for speaking out about social justice in the realm of health policy.

== Education and career ==
Young was born in Chicago, Illinois, the son of Sarah Wolf and Abraham Young, a real estate salesman. His parents were Jewish immigrants from Eastern Europe. He attended Hyde Park High School, the University of Chicago, and Northwestern University Medical School. He interned at Cook County Hospital in 1947 and did his residency there.

He was a founder and served as national chairman of the Medical Committee for Human Rights, which was formed in June 1964 to provide medical care for civil rights workers, community activists, and summer volunteers working in Mississippi during Freedom Summer. Quentin Young and MCHR also volunteered and helped set up Black Panthers and Young Lords health clinics and provided emergency medical care to protesters at the 1968 Democratic National Convention in Chicago. In October 1968 he was called to testify before the House Un-American Activities Committee about his knowledge of the DNC protests.

Young was Chairman of Medicine at Cook County Hospital in Chicago from 1972 to 1981.

Young founded Health and Medicine Policy Research Group in 1980, and for many years was chairman of the board of that organization.

Young was President of American Public Health Association in 1988.

In April 2008, Young retired from his private practice in Hyde Park, Chicago, which he co-ran with fellow activist David Scheiner. For many years was the national coordinator for Physicians for a National Health Program (PNHP).

On April 17. 2009, he was appointed by Illinois Governor Pat Quinn to chair the Illinois Health Facilities Planning Board. From 1967-2008 he was senior physician of Michael Reese Hospital and Medical Center.

He died on March 7, 2016, in California. Dr. Young was survived by five children: Nancy, Polly, Ethan, Barbara and Michael.

== Positions of note ==
- Clinical Professor of Preventive Medicine and Community Health, University of Illinois Medical Center
- Senior Attending Physician, Michael Reese Hospital
- Member, American Medical Association (since 1952))
- National Coordinator, Physicians for a National Health Program
- Chairman, American College of Physicians' Subcommittee on Human Rights and Medical Practice
- Member, Humana-Michael Reese Medical Board
- Member, American College of Physicians Health and Public Policy Committee
- Personal physician to Martin Luther King Jr. during his stay in Chicago, and also to Chicago Mayor Harold Washington, author Studs Terkel, Illinois Governor Pat Quinn and personal physician to Chemist, the late Samuel Shore. President Barack Obama was the patient of Dr. Young's practice partner, Dr. David Scheiner, for twenty years before becoming president.
- Personal physician to the Reverend Jesse Jackson.
- Featured (and documented) in the book "The Enemies Within" by Trevor Loudon

== The public's physician ==
Young appeared regularly at public health events and was considered the de facto authority on public health in Chicago. He was a frequent guest on Chicago Public Radio, especially the weekday news magazine program Eight Forty-Eight. The medical Students for Human Rights worked with him to set up several free neighborhood clinics in Chicago including the Black Panthers and Young Lords clinics.

== Efforts for single-payer healthcare ==
According to Young, "national health insurance is no longer the best solution, it's the only solution: All other alternatives have been proven disastrous failures."

Young has worked with Physicians for a National Health Program (PNHP) since 1987, a Chicago-based not-for-profit organization. He was the National Coordinator for PNHP.

== Activism during the Bush administration ==
=== NSA domestic surveillance ===
In May 2006, Young signed on as a plaintiff in a suit filed by the American Civil Liberties Union (ACLU) against AT&T, alleging that the telecommunications company provided its customers' phone records to the United States government without a court-issued warrant. Young joined historian and author Studs Terkel who was also a plaintiff in the case. This suit was part of the NSA warrantless surveillance controversy, during which it was reported that the National Security Agency was maintaining a database of phone calls placed domestically in the United States.

=== Medical savings accounts ===
Young is an outspoken opponent of medical savings account (MSAs), a public health policy promoted by President George W. Bush. Young calls them a "scam on American patients and taxpayers," and "based on the incorrect assumption that Americans are addicts for health care and that if there isn’t a dollar barrier, they’ll overconsume. In fact, Americans get fewer doctors’ visits than people in countries with universal health care."
