= Eliyahu Stoupel =

- Born: Ilja Stupelis; June 20, 1929; Kaunas, Lithuania
- Died: December 27, 2022 (aged 93); Hod HaSharon, Israel
- Education: Vilnius University
- Spouse: Sophia Danguole Nugaraite
- Children: 2
- Medical career
- Profession: Cardiologist
- Institutions: Vilnius University Hospital; Beilinson Medical Center; Department of Health and Internal Medicine (Nementzine, Lithuania)

Eliyahu Stoupel (June 20, 1929 – December 27, 2022) was a prominent Lithuanian–Israeli cardiologist, researcher and humanitarian. He began his career at Vilnius University in Lithuania, later moving to Rabin Medical Center in Israel. When cardiac surgery first began to make inroads into the USSR, he was sent as part of the cardiosurgical team from Lithuania to help establish the first teams at the new Thoracic Surgery Institute in Moscow. He later became a leading figure in Israeli cardiology, as well as a prominent voice against nuclear war as the president of the Israeli branch of the International Physicians for the Prevention of Nuclear War.

He became full professor at Vilnius in 1970 and emigrated to Israel in 1974, where he worked in Beilinson Hospital, later part of Rabin Medical Center.

== Early years ==
Stoupel was born Ilja Stupelis in Kovno, Lithuania (now known as Kaunas) to Grigorijus (Gregory) Stupelis and Esther (née Lan) in 1929. His father, Grigorijus, was a well-known interwar pianist and conductor from a family with many generations of musicians. His grandfather, Meyer Stupelis, was for many years conductor of the Liutnia theater orchestra in Vilnius, and his grandmother Marija–Mirjam was from the Antokolski family of Vilnius. His mother, Ester, was the daughter of the well-known printer and owner of the Kaunas Jewish theater, Gabriel Lanas. From 1945 to 1946, he studied physics at Vilnius State University, and from 1946 to 1952 medicine.

== Professional career ==
Stoupel worked as head physician at the Nemenčinė district hospital from 1952 to 1955. In 1955, he was appointed director of the District Department of Health and Internal Medicine of Nemenčinė and head of the Health Department of the Vilnius I outpatient clinic, posts he held until 1958; during this same period he was also on staff at Vilnius University Hospital as a family physician.

In 1958, Stoupel was appointed to the department of cardiology and thoracic surgery. While at Vilnius Hospital, he prepared his candidate dissertation under advisor Professor Liubomiras Laucevičius, which he defended in 1960 (on the diagnosis of hypertensive disease using Rauwolfia serpentina preparations, first tested directly on hypertensive patients in India in 1952).

In 1962, he became a resident of cardiology in Professor Pranas Norkūnas's cardiac surgery clinic, working alongside surgeons — future professors A. Pronckus, Algimantas Jonas Marcinkevičius, and other later well-known Lithuanian cardiac surgeons. That same year, he became an assistant professor for postgraduate medical studies at the same institution, where he was promoted to associate professor in 1966 and full professor in 1970, remaining until 1974. Together with cardiac surgeons, he consulted on all cardiac operations performed in Lithuania due to narrowing of the mitral valve. Monitoring the results of these operations provided him with the material he required for his 1966 doctoral dissertation entitled Mitral Stenosis after Commissurotomy.

He then moved to Israel in 1974, where he became chief consultant in cardiology at the Heart Institute at Beilinson Medical Center in Petah Tikva, where he remained for over 25 years. Beginning in 1994, he was a cardiology professor at the Sackler Faculty of Medicine at Tel Aviv University. As a member of numerous cardiology societies, he participated with presentations at numerous international cardiology congresses in Tokyo, Moscow, Manila, Washington, and Barcelona.

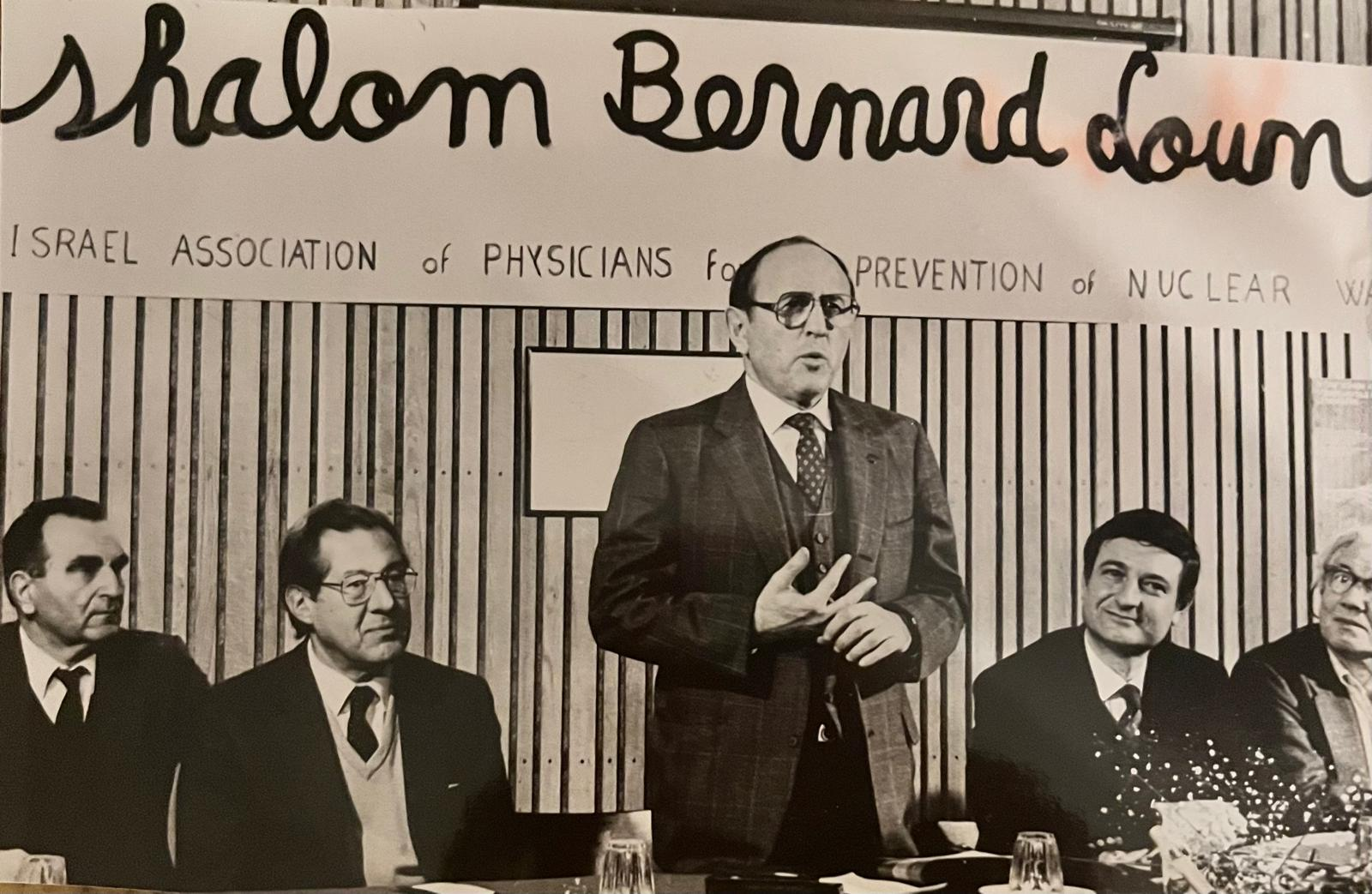
Meeting of the Israeli Branch of the IPPNW held on January 29, 1986, at Hebrew University, Israel. Bernard Lown is shown in the center, Ernesto Kahan to his immediate right and Stoupel is to the far left.

He was president of the Israeli branch of the International Physicians for the Prevention of Nuclear War from 1984 to 1991. He was also a fellow of the International Society of Internal Medicine, a fellow of the European Society of Cardiology and the Israeli Cardiology Association.

== Personal life ==
On July 2, 1998, by decree of the President Valdas Adamkus of Lithuania, he was granted Lithuanian citizenship as an exception.

While in Israel, Stoupel lived in Hod Hasharon. His daughter Janet is a periodontist.

== Publications ==
Stoupel was the author of books in Lithuanian, Russian, and English. His scientific work focused on arterial hypertension (1950–1960), cardiac and heart disease surgery (1962–1994), cardiological prognosis (1967–1976), and clinical cosmobiology (1968–1993). He published over 150 scientific articles in various sub-disciplines of cardiology and cosmobiology, and released 5 books.

- Prognosis in Cardiology 1971
- Mitral Valve Disease after Comissurotomy, 1973
- Forecasting in Cardiology 1976
- Studies in Clinical Cosmobiology, 1968–1993
- Space Weather and Timing of Cardiovascular Events, 2012
