= Freda Friedman Salzman =

American physicist and activist (1927–1981)

- Born: May 12, 1927; Brooklyn, United States
- Died: April 1, 1981
- Education: Brooklyn College, BS 1949; University of Illinois Urbana-Champaign, PhD
- Known for: Chew–Low–Salzman method
- Scientific career
- Fields: Physics
- Workplaces: University of Massachusetts Boston; University of Rochester; University of Colorado
- Doctoral advisor: Geoffrey Chew
- Other academic advisors: Melba Phillips

Freda Friedman Salzman (May 12, 1927 – April 1, 1981) was an American theoretical physicist who was active in Science for the People and the Sociobiology Study Group. She is also known for her well-publicized struggle for employment with the University of Massachusetts Boston.

== Early life and education ==
Freda Friedman Salzman was born Freda Friedman on May 12, 1927 in Brooklyn, New York to Jacob Friedman and Anne Mendolson. She earned her Bachelor's degree from Brooklyn College in 1949 where she was a student of Melba Phillips.

Friedman then earned her PhD from the University of Illinois Urbana-Champaign under Geoffrey Chew. Her dissertation concerned the photoproduction of mesons from a single nucleon.

== Career and research ==
After graduate school, Friedman worked at the University of Illinois, the University of Rochester, and the University of Colorado. During this time she collaborated with her husband George Salzman on research in high energy physics, including single-particle exchange models, multiperipheral models, and the electromagnetic interactions of vector bosons. She would also later work on the dynamical content of the Schwarzschild metric. One of her major scientific contributions was the Chew–Low–Salzman method which numerically solved a nonlinear integral equation within the Chew–Low model for nuclear interactions.

In 1965, both Freda Salzman and her husband were hired at the newly-opened University of Massachusetts Boston and instructed to begin building teaching and research programs in physics. The University had amended its anti-nepotism policy in 1963 to state that while two family members could now be employed in the same department, if both were highly qualified, only one would be offered tenure. George Salzman was offered a full-time position with tenure while Freda was offered a three-quarter position without tenure.

In 1967, the Chancellor of the University of Massachusetts decided not to renew Freda Salzman's position, citing the anti-nepotism policy. Despite support from the physics department, Salzman's position was officially terminated in 1968. A protracted campaign for Salzman to be reinstated followed, in which Salzman received widespread support, including by the university's tenure and grievance committee, the National Organization for Women, and a public petition. As a result of the campaign, the university's board of trustees removed the anti-nepotism policy as a consideration in faculty hiring. Salzman was reappointed as an associate professor without tenure in 1972, and received tenure in 1975. Salzman's husband George was a vocal supporter of her efforts to attain stable employment.

== Activism ==
Salzman was active in multiple groups, including Science for the People, its Sociobiology Study Group, and its Women's Issues Project Group. In 1977 she spoke as part of the Black Rose lecture series, giving a talk entitled: "Scientific Sexism: 'From Freud to Sociobiology.'" Salzman was outspoken on issues including sexism and sociobiology.

== Death and legacy ==
Salzman was diagnosed with malignant breast cancer in 1979 and died in 1981.
