= Liran Einav =

American-Israeli economist

- לירן איינב
- Born: November 1970 (age 55); Tel Aviv
- Occupations: Economist, Professor

Academic background
- Education: Tel Aviv University; Harvard University

Academic work
- Discipline: Economics
- Sub-discipline: Industrial organization, health economics
- Institutions: Stanford University

Liran Einav (Hebrew: לירן איינב; born November 1970 in Tel Aviv) is an American–Israeli economist and currently a professor of economics at Stanford University. His research focuses on industrial organization, health and regulation.

== Early life and education ==
From 1988 to 1996, Einav served as a captain in the intelligence unit of the Israel Defense Forces.

Following military service, he enrolled at Tel Aviv University and graduated with a BA in computer science and economics in 1997. He went on to further study at Harvard University and received his Ph.D. in economics in 2002.

== Academic career ==
After graduating from Harvard University, Einav's first academic position was as an assistant professor at Stanford University. He was granted tenure and promoted to associate professor in 2007 and full professor in 2012.

He has served in an editorial capacity for various academic journals such as The American Economic Review, Econometrica and American Economic Journals: Applied Economics.

He was elected fellow of the Econometric Society and the American Academy of Arts and Sciences in 2012 and 2015, respectively.

== Selected works ==
- Eilat, Yair; Einav, Liran (2004). "Determinants of international tourism: A three-dimensional panel data analysis". Applied Economics. 36 (12): 1315–1327. doi:10.1080/000368404000180897. S2CID 17639423.
- Cohen, Alma; Einav, Liran (2007). "Estimating Risk Preferences from Deductible Choice". American Economic Review. 97 (3): 745–788. doi:10.1257/aer.97.3.745. S2CID 46658884.
- Einav, L.; Levin, J. (2014). "Economics in the age of big data". Science. 346 (6210) 1243089. doi:10.1126/science.1243089. PMID 25378629. S2CID 1938719.
- Einav, Liran; Farronato, Chiara; Levin, Jonathan (2016). "Peer-to-Peer Markets". Annual Review of Economics. 8: 615–635. doi:10.1146/annurev-economics-080315-015334. S2CID 5454354.
- Curto, Vilsa; Einav, Liran; Levin, Jonathan; Bhattacharya, Jay (2021). "Can Health Insurance Competition Work? Evidence from Medicare Advantage". Journal of Political Economy. 129 (2): 570–606. doi:10.1086/711951. S2CID 226192586.
