= Steffie Woolhandler =

Physician and health care advocate

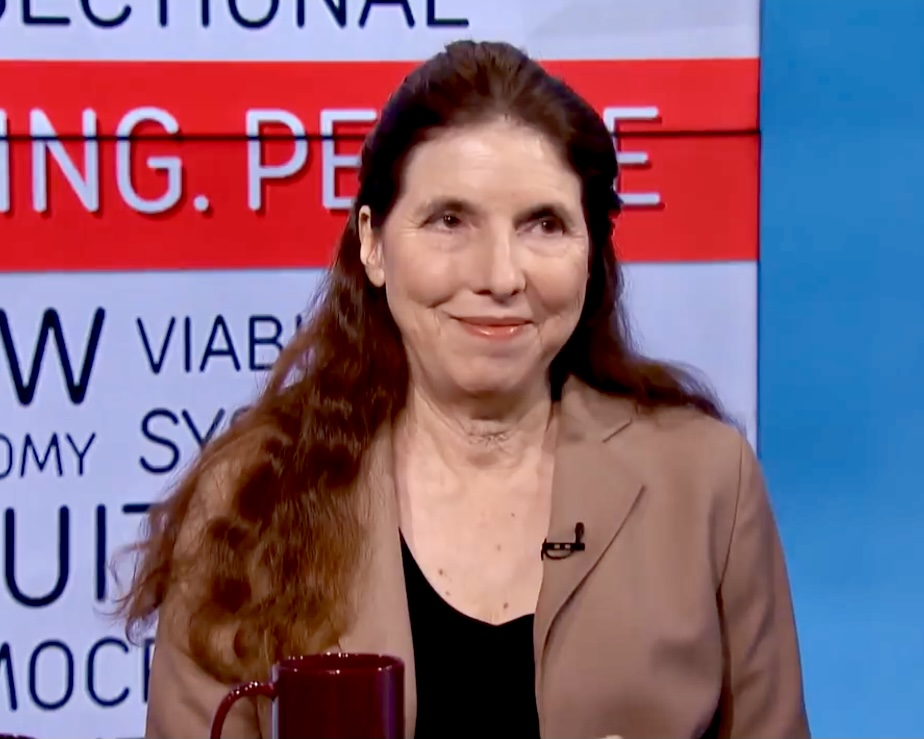
- Woolhandler in 2018
- Born: 1950 or 1951 (age 74–75)
- Education: Stanford University; Louisiana State University; University of California, Berkeley
- Occupation: Physician
- Employer: CUNY School of Public Health
- Organization: Physicians for a National Health Program
- Title: Distinguished Professor of Public Health and Health Policy
- Partner: David Himmelstein

Stephanie Joan "Steffie" Woolhandler (born 1950 or 1951 in Shreveport, Louisiana) is an American primary care physician and medical researcher. An advocate for single-payer health insurance in the United States, she is a co-founder of Physicians for a National Health Program (PNHP).

She is Distinguished Professor of Public Health and Health Policy at the CUNY School of Public Health at Hunter College and an adjunct clinical professor at the Albert Einstein College of Medicine.

She is also a lecturer in medicine at Harvard Medical School, where she formerly co-directed the general internal medicine fellowship program.

== Early life and education ==
Steffie Woolhandler (born 1950 or 1951) grew up in Louisiana; her father was a radiologist in Shreveport, her mother a homemaker who died when Steffi was 8 years old. Woolhandler received her bachelor's degree from Stanford University in 1975, at the conclusion of the Vietnam War. Her involvement in the movement against the war at that time influenced her decision to pursue medicine, reflecting that “I sought a career that allowed me to continue my work for social change.” She received her medical degree from Louisiana State University. The “conservatism of [her peer] medical professionals” frustrated her and solidified a desire within her to be an advocate for social change within her profession. She returned to California to do her internship at San Francisco General Hospital and obtained her master's degree in public health from the University of California, Berkeley.

== Career ==
Since she was young, Woolhandler imagined that she would help the underserved that she grew up around, and that her medical career would involve “providing hands-on care” to those in need. She trained and practiced in public hospitals in California and Massachusetts before joining the faculty at Harvard in 1987. From 1990 to 1991, she worked at the Robert Wood Johnson Foundation as a health policy fellow at the Institute of Medicine and the U.S. Congress.

Woolhandler is also a prominent academic, and credits Robert S. Lawrence, then chief of medicine at The Cambridge Hospital for helping her bridge her social activism with her formidable academic pursuits. Initially believing that her hand in social change would be in direct, hands-on service to the community, Woolhandler shifted her focus to academic scholarship as an avenue for social change. In 1987, Woolhandler co-Founded Physicians for a National Health Program (PNHP), to provide a voice for physicians seeking to combat their more conservative peers. The organization focused their early efforts on publishing in reputable journals such as The New England Journal of Medicine, and JAMA, but have since shifted toward activism work, growing to include nurses and other health professionals and boasting a chapter in nearly every state in the continental US. Some activities include direct lobbying of policy makers, attempting to persuade other physicians to support a government-run health care plan, as well as organized sit-ins and demonstrations at various private run insurance company locations. For example, in 2009, over 150 activists were arrested for sitting in the lobbies of offices such as Aetna, Cigna, and Humana, many of them physicians and nurses aligned with PNHP. The organization has continued to gain prominence, and in 2016 advised the presidential campaign of Senator Bernie Sanders.

== Research ==
Woolhandler has published more than 200 papers on the subjects of health policy, administrative overhead, the uninsured, health care access and financing.

Her critique of the current US system has expanded by comparing it the Canadian system, highlighting in a 2003 interview with the New York Times that Canada is also able to deliver high tech medicine and high tech care, yet “spend half of what [the US does].” She also works to clear misconceptions that are perpetuated by those opposed to a single-payer system. She has countered claims of Canada's system being slow regarding wait times for procedures by emphasizing that they are underfunded compared to the US system, “not because it is structurally wrong”.

She is co-chair of the Lancet Commission on Public Policy and Health in the Trump Era, in February 2021 issuing a report that compared US deaths from Coronavirus disease 2019 to mortality rates in the other G7 countries. The report found 40% of US deaths were avoidable and attributable to mismanagement by the Trump Administration.

== Honors and awards ==
In 1994, Woolhandler received the Edward K. Barsky Award from the Physicians Forum, and in 1996 the Ethical Culture Society named her "Humanist of the Year." In 2009, she received that year's A. Clifford Barger Excellence in Mentoring Award from Harvard.

== Personal life ==
Woolhandler's partner, since 1979, is PNHP co-founder David U. Himmelstein. They have two daughters.

== Writings ==
- Gaffney, Adam, David U. Himmelstein, and Steffie Woolhandler, "The Only Way to Fix US Health Care" (partly a review of Liran Einav and Amy Finkelstein, We've Got You Covered: Rebooting American Health Care, Portfolio, 2023, 275 pp.), The New York Review of Books, vol. LXXI, no. 17 (7 November 2024), pp. 34, 36–38. "Under our patchwork public-private [health-care] system, people lose coverage for many reasons.... [A] simpler, more efficient, healthier, and fairer alternative has long been available: universal single-tier coverage. Representative Pramila Jayapal and Senator Bernie Sanders have introduced Medicare for All bills delineating that approach.... Profit seeking in medicine is not new. Pliny the Elder complained of physicians' 'avarice, their greedy bargains made with those whose fate lies in the balances.'... [T]he contemporary takeover of health care provision and financing by mammoth investor-owned firms – ... the 'medical-industrial complex'... – is unprecedented.... Beginning in the 1980s investor-owned hospital chains rapidly expanded... Now vertical integration – one firm owning, say, insurance plans as well as medical providers – is remaking the medical landscape. Increasingly, your doctor is employed by your insurer and risks unemployment if they fight insurers' restrictions on your care.... Even more perniciously, private equity firms are invading health care... Nationwide, private equity acquisition causes a 24 percent fall in hospitals' assets and a 25 percent rise in patients' hospital-acquired complications, such as infections and falls." [p. 36.] "Another system of health care – without medical debt, insurance hassles, red tape, corporate predation, copays, punishing deductibles, and paltry care – is possible, not to mention that support for it is hugely popular." (p. 38.)

== See also ==
- Healthcare in the United States
- Healthcare reform in the United States
