= Physicians for a National Health Program =

U.S. healthcare professionals' advocacy group for a single-payer national health program

- Formation: 1987
- Type: Professional association
- Tax ID no.: 04-2937697
- Legal status: 501(c)(3)
- Purpose: "Advocates for universal, comprehensive single-payer national health insurance, and collaborates with others to fight racism and advance social justice."
- Headquarters: 29 E. Madison St., Ste. 1412, Chicago, Illinois 60602, U.S.
- Region served: United States
- Members: 22,000 as of 2022
- President: Diljeet Singh, MD, DrPH,
- Revenue: $955,758 (2021)
- Website: pnhp.org

Physicians for a National Health Program (PNHP) is an advocacy organization of more than 20,000 American physicians, medical students, and health professionals that supports a universal, comprehensive single-payer national health insurance program. Since being co-founded in 1987 by physicians David Himmelstein and Steffie Woolhandler, PNHP has advocated for reform in the U.S. health care system.

PNHP is the only national physician organization in the United States dedicated exclusively to implementing a single-payer national health program. The organization and its members work to educate physicians and other health professionals about the benefits of a single-payer system, including fewer administrative costs and affording health insurance for the millions of Americans who have none. Additionally, PNHP performs research on the health crisis and the need for fundamental reform, coordinates speakers and forums, participates in town hall meetings and debates, contributes scholarly articles to peer-reviewed medical journals, and appears regularly on national television and news programs advocating for a single-payer system.

The group is best known for its influential proposals for national health insurance, which have been published in the New England Journal of Medicine, JAMA, and the American Journal of Public Health.

The group is also known for its members' substantial contributions to scientific research on the uninsured, health system economics and international health systems. Members such as David Himmelstein, Steffie Woolhandler, Marcia Angell and Arnold Relman have contributed articles to major peer-reviewed journals such as the New England Journal of Medicine (of which Angell and Relman are former editors-in-chief), JAMA, Health Affairs, and The American Journal of Medicine. Quentin Young was president of the organization from 1991 to 1993.

== See also ==
- Health care reform
- List of healthcare reform advocacy groups in the United States
- Medicare for All Act
- National Physicians Alliance
- Physicians' Council for Responsible Reform
- Universal health care
