= David Himmelstein =

American physician

David U. Himmelstein is an American academic physician specializing in internal medicine. He is a distinguished professor of public health and health policy in the CUNY School of Public Health at Hunter College, an adjunct clinical professor at Albert Einstein College of Medicine, and a lecturer at Harvard Medical School.

He is the co-founder, with Steffie Woolhandler, of Physicians for a National Health Program (PNHP), an organization advocating for single-payer healthcare in the United States.

== Biography ==
Himmelstein received his M.D. from the Columbia University College of Physicians and Surgeons. He then completed his training at the University of California San Francisco's Highland Hospital and his fellowship at Harvard Medical School, both in internal medicine. He was formerly the chief of the division of social and community medicine at Cambridge Hospital in Massachusetts.

He is a distinguished professor of public health and health policy in the CUNY School of Public Health at Hunter College, an adjunct clinical professor at Albert Einstein College of Medicine, and a lecturer at Harvard Medical School. He is the co-founder with Steffie Woolhandler of Physicians for a National Health Program, an organization advocating for single-payer healthcare in the United States.

== Research ==
Himmelstein is the author or co-author of over 100 peer-reviewed articles on health care-related issues like medical bankruptcies and health care costs in the United States. For example, a 1984 study he published on patient dumping spurred the United States' Congress to pass the Emergency Medical Treatment and Active Labor Act, a law which banned the practice. With Woolhandler, he has also researched the effect of uninsurance on mortality.

== Personal life ==
David Himmelstein's partner, since 1979, is PNHP co-founder Steffie Woolhandler. They have two daughters.

== Writings ==
- Gaffney, Adam, David U. Himmelstein, and Steffie Woolhandler, "The Only Way to Fix US Health Care" (partly a review of Liran Einav and Amy Finkelstein, We've Got You Covered: Rebooting American Health Care, Portfolio, 2023, 275 pp.), The New York Review of Books, vol. LXXI, no. 17 (7 November 2024), pp. 34, 36–38. "Under our patchwork public-private [health-care] system, people lose coverage for many reasons.... [A] simpler, more efficient, healthier, and fairer alternative has long been available: universal single-tier coverage. Representative Pramila Jayapal and Senator Bernie Sanders have introduced Medicare for All bills delineating that approach.... Profit seeking in medicine is not new. Pliny the Elder complained of physicians' 'avarice, their greedy bargains made with those whose fate lies in the balances.'... [T]he contemporary takeover of health care provision and financing by mammoth investor-owned firms – ... the 'medical-industrial complex'... – is unprecedented.... Beginning in the 1980s investor-owned hospital chains rapidly expanded... Now vertical integration – one firm owning, say, insurance plans as well as medical providers – is remaking the medical landscape. Increasingly, your doctor is employed by your insurer and risks unemployment if they fight insurers' restrictions on your care.... Even more perniciously, private equity firms are invading health care... Nationwide, private equity acquisition causes a 24 percent fall in hospitals' assets and a 25 percent rise in patients' hospital-acquired complications, such as infections and falls." [p. 36.] "Another system of health care – without medical debt, insurance hassles, red tape, corporate predation, copays, punishing deductibles, and paltry care – is possible, not to mention that support for it is hugely popular." (p. 38.)

== See also ==
- Healthcare in the United States
- Healthcare reform in the United States
