= Duplicate publication =

Multiple publication of the same scientific material

Duplicate publication, multiple publication, redundant publication or self-plagiarism refers to publishing the same intellectual material more than once, by the author or publisher. It does not refer to the unauthorized republication by someone else, which constitutes plagiarism, copyright violation, or both.

== History ==
In a print-only era before modern discoverability via the internet and digital search and before systematic reviews, meta-analyses, and citation indexes existed, despite a few rudimentary journal clubs, it was likely for readers who subscribed to journals in one city, region, or specialty, to have only sporadic contact with journals from other places or specialties. Thus, redundant publication could serve a valid purpose analogous to the way that various newspapers in different cities and countries often report news items from elsewhere, ensuring that people in many places receive them despite that they do not read multiple periodicals from many other places. However, as discoverability increased in the 20th century and the aforementioned concerns arose, critical views of redundant publication, beyond merely reproaching vanity, took shape.

A formalization of the policy of disallowing duplicate publications was given by Franz J. Ingelfinger, the editor of The New England Journal of Medicine, in 1969. He coined the term Ingelfinger rule banning republications in the journal. Most journals follow this policy today. The BMJ, for example, requires copies of any previous work with more than 10% overlap of a submission to be submitted before approving a work for publication. However, there is at least one form of publishing the same article in multiple journals that is still widely accepted, which is that some medical societies that issue joint medical guidelines will copublish those guidelines in both of the societies' official journals; for example, joint guidelines by the American Heart Association and the American College of Cardiology are usually published in both Circulation and the Journal of the American College of Cardiology. This type of dual publication is analogous to co-editions of a book.

With the advancement of the internet, there are now several tools available to aid in the detection of plagiarism and multiple publications within biomedical literature. One tool developed in 2006 by researchers in Harold Garner's laboratory at University of Texas Southwestern Medical Center at Dallas was Déjà Vu, an open-access database containing several thousand instances of duplicate publication.

== Criticism ==
Multiple submission is not plagiarism, but it is today often viewed as academic misbehavior because it can skew meta-analyses and review articles and can distort citation indexes and citation impact by gaming the system to a degree. It was not always looked upon as harshly, as it began centuries ago and, besides the negative motive of vanity which has always been possible, it also had a legitimate motive in reaching readerships of various journals and books that were at real risk of not otherwise overlapping.

Publication of the same or overlapping research in both English and the local language in different journals should not be interpreted as a duplicate publication. There is still a large proportion of doctors and other professionals in many countries who have limited access to international journals and many lack language skills in English. Therefore, publication of the same or overlapping research in different languages should not be considered double publication since it aims to reach different groups of readers and contribute to a more effective dissemination of knowledge.

Journals sometimes choose to republish seminal articles, whether from their own past volumes, from other journals, or both. Re-publication serves the goal of bringing important information to new readerships, which makes it analogous to some instances of duplicate publication on that score. However, it is different from duplicate publication in the respect that there is no element of merely gaming the system of citation impact. Republished articles are clearly labeled as such, allowing them to be recognized as such in citation analysis.

== See also ==
- Self-plagiarism
