= Jeffrey M. Drazen =

American physician and journal editor

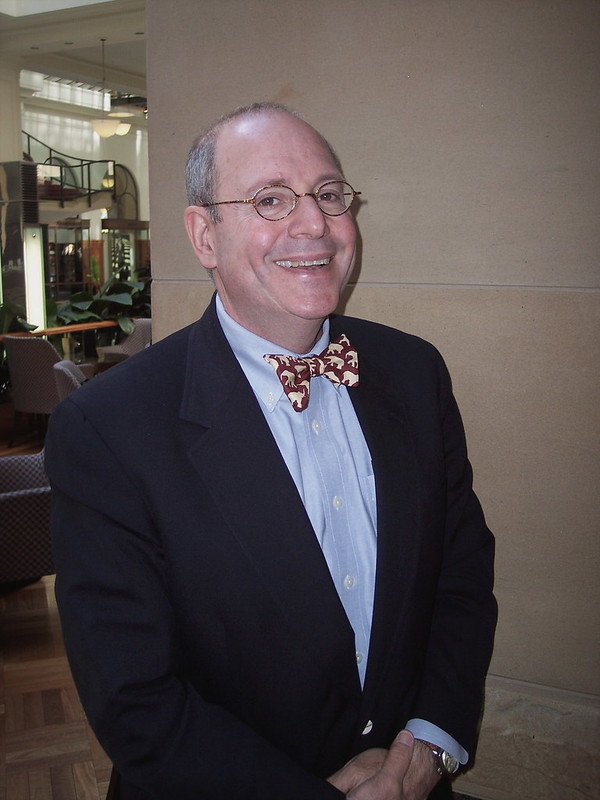
- Born: St. Louis, Missouri, USA
- Education: Tufts University (Undergraduate) Harvard Medical School (MD)
- Occupation: Physician
- Employer(s): Brigham and Women’s Hospital, Harvard Medical School, Harvard School of Public Health
- Known for: Editing The New England Journal of Medicine
- Website: https://physiciandirectory.brighamandwomens.org/Details/238

Jeffrey M. Drazen is an American physician who was the editor-in-chief of The New England Journal of Medicine from 2000 to 2019. He currently holds the positions of senior physician at the Brigham and Women’s Hospital, Distinguished Parker B. Francis Professor of Medicine at Harvard Medical School, professor of physiology at the Harvard School of Public Health, and adjunct professor of medicine at the Boston University School of Medicine. He is the recipient of honorary degrees from the University of Ferrara, the University of Athens, the University of Modena and the University of Paris-Sud.

== Life and education ==
Born and raised in St. Louis, Missouri, Drazen majored in physics at Tufts University and graduated from Harvard Medical School in 1972. At Tufts he met Erica Lawson Coburn, whom he later married. He performed his medical internship and residency at Peter Bent Brigham Hospital and was a clinical fellow and a research fellow at Harvard Medical School and the Harvard School of Public Health. Thereafter, he served as chief of Pulmonary Medicine at the Beth Israel Hospital in Boston, chief of the combined Pulmonary Divisions of the Beth Israel and Brigham and Women’s Hospitals, and then as chief of Pulmonary Medicine at Brigham and Women’s Hospital.

== Career ==
Drazen has worked with the National Institutes of Health in a variety of capacities, including membership of study sections, the Pulmonary Disease Advisory Council, the National Heart, Lung and Blood Institute Advisory Council, and the National Library of Medicine Public Access Working Group. He has also served on the Veterans’ Administration National Research Advisory Council.

Drazen is an elected member of the American Society for Clinical Investigation, the Association of American Physicians, the Inter-Urban Clinical Club and the National Academy of Medicine. He co-chaired the Institute of Medicine's Forum on Drug Discovery, Development, and Translation for 6 years and was a member of the World Health Organization’s Scientific Advisory Group on Clinical Trials Registration.

An active researcher in the field of pulmonary medicine, Drazen defined the role of novel endogenous chemical agents in asthma. This led to four new licensed pharmaceuticals for asthma.

Drazen has published over 600 papers, editorials, and review articles and has edited six books, including Cecil Medicine and Asthma and COPD.

Drazen has served on the editorial boards of the Journal of Applied Physiology, the American Journal of Physiology, Pulmonary Pharmacology, Experimental Lung Research, the Journal of Clinical Investigation, the American Journal of Respiratory Cell and Molecular Biology, and The American Journal of Medicine. In addition, he has been an associate junior editor of the Journal of Clinical Investigation and the American Journal of Respiratory and Critical Care Medicine.
