= Anthony Gianelly =

American orthodontist (1936–2009)

- Born: 1936; Boston, Massachusetts
- Died: 28 May 2009 (aged 72–73)
- Education: Harvard College, Harvard School of Dental Medicine
- Known for: Inventing the biodimentional technique in orthodontics; Chair of Orthodontics Program at Boston University
- Medical career
- Profession: Dentist
- Institutions: Boston University
- Sub-specialties: Orthodontics
- Research: Orthodontics

Anthony Gianelly (1936–2009) was an American orthodontist. He developed the bi-dimensional technique, which is widely used in various private practices of orthodontics and has been the subject of numerous publications over the years.

Gianelly served as the Chair of the Department of Orthodontics and Dentofacial Orthopedics at Boston University Henry M. Goldman School of Dental Medicine.

== Life ==
Gianelly was born in Boston in 1936, and was the younger of two brothers. He attended Harvard College and played in the Harvard Crimson football team as a leading fullback and a linebacker in the varsity football team during the 1954–1956 season. He also was part of Harvard rugby and the Harvard track and field team.

He received his dental degree from Harvard School of Dental Medicine in 1961 and received his orthodontics degree in 1963. He became a research fellow in Orthodontics at Harvard in 1963, and was appointed associate professor of orthodontics at Boston University in 1967. He obtained his PhD degree in biology and biochemistry from Boston University in 1967 and received his MD degree from Boston University School of Medicine in 1974. While obtaining his PhD degree, he also became a full-time professor at Boston University School of Dental Medicine, a position he held until his death.

He died of a heart attack at the age of 72 on May 28, 2009. Gianelly is survived by his wife, two children, and two grandchildren.

== Orthodontics ==
Gianelly developed the bidimensional technique, in which two orthodontic different bracket slots are used in the mouth. An 0.018 slot is used on the central and lateral incisors and an 0.022 slot is used on the canines, premolars and molars. A wire such as 18x25 can allow a tight fit in the anterior brackets with the 0.018 slot and a loose fit in the posterior teeth with a 0.022 slot. Posteriorly, this allows less friction to be involved, which leads to a better sliding mechanism. There is about 0.004in slot between the posterior brackets and wire.

Gianelly published over 90 scientific articles in his career, and co-authored textbooks including Biologic Basis of Orthodontics (1971), Ortodonzia, Concetti Practici (1985), and Bidimensional Technique: Theory and Practice (2000).

== Awards ==
- Louise Ada Jarabak Memorial Award - 2009
- American Association of Orthodontists Annual Session - 2009
- Spencer N. Frankl Award - 1999
- Lifetime Achievement Award from Italian Society of Orthodontists - 1999
