= Boston University Medical Campus =

Satellite medical campus of Boston University

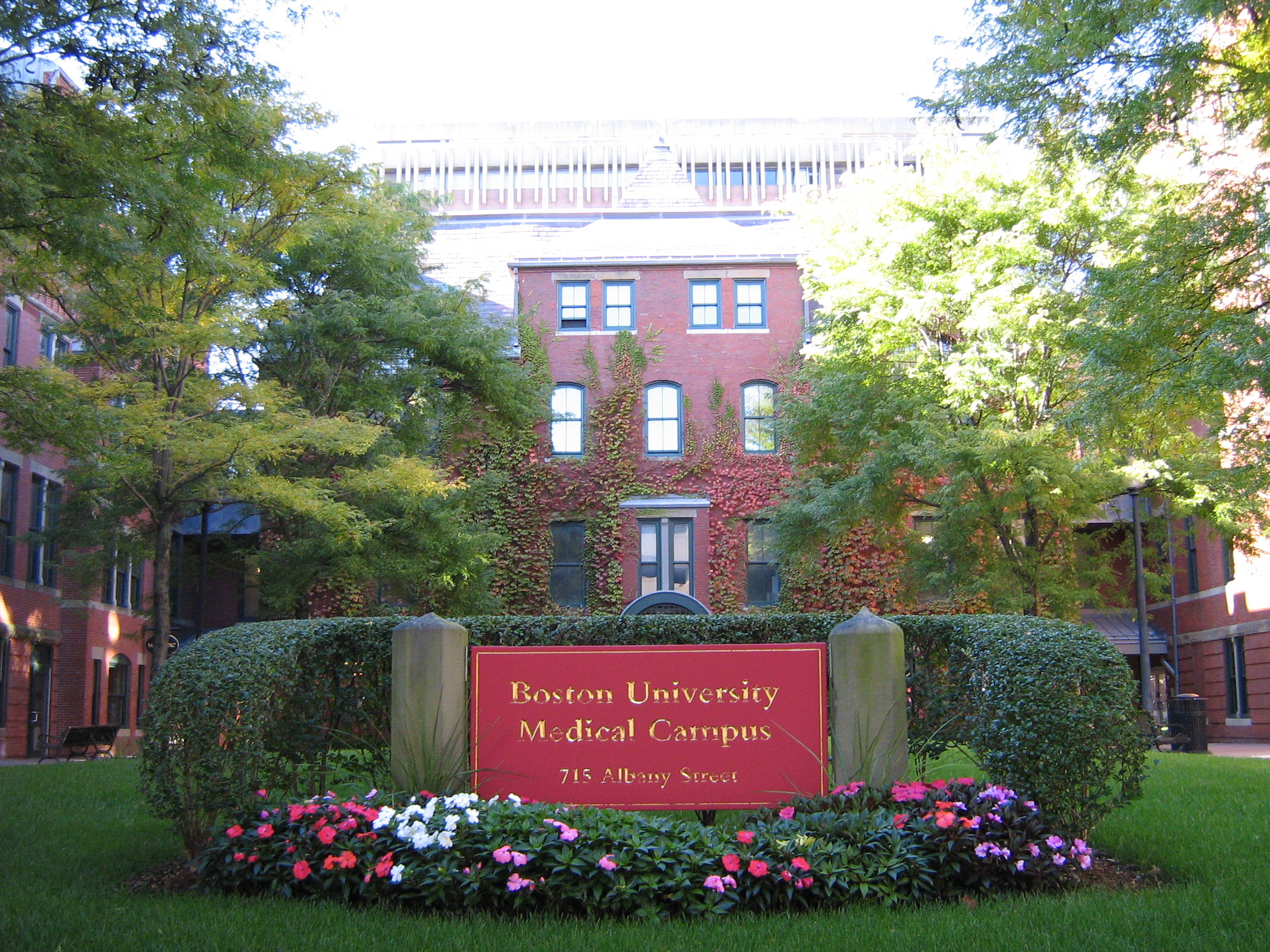
- Type: Private
- Established: 1848
- President: Robert A. Brown
- Provost: Karen H. Antman
- Location: Boston, Massachusetts, U.S.
- Campus: Urban
- Website: http://www.bumc.bu.edu/

The Boston University Medical Campus (BUMC) is one of the three campuses of Boston University, the others being the Charles River Campus and the Fenway Campus. The campus is situated in the South End neighborhood of Boston, Massachusetts, United States. In conjunction with the Charles River Campus, BUMC provides the Boston University Shuttle (BUS) to transport students, staff, and faculty between campuses. The current provost of BUMC is Karen H. Antman.

== Schools ==
- School of Medicine
  - Division of Graduate Medical Sciences
- School of Public Health
- Goldman School of Dental Medicine

== Research institutes and centers ==
- Alzheimer's Disease Center
- Amyloid Treatment & Research Center
- Behavioral Development & Mental Retardation, Center for
- Boston University Area Health Education Center
- Cancer Research Center
- Cardiovascular Proteomics Center
- Cell & Molecular Biology Program
- Center for Regenerative Medicine
- Genetics Program
- Hearing Research Center
- Human Genetics, Center for
- International Health, Center for
- NeuroMuscular Research Center
- New England & Regional Spinal Cord Injury Center
- Primary Care, Center for
- Pulmonary Center
- Pulmonary Hypertension Center
- Sexual Medicine, Institute of
- Sickle Cell Disease, Center of Excellence In
- Vitamin D Research Center
- Whitaker Cardiovascular Institute
- Women's Health Interdisciplinary Research Center

== Other departments ==
- Alumni Medical Library

=== Public Safety Department ===
The BUMC Public Safety Department employs about 125 public safety officers who are charged with ensuring the safety and security of all patients, staff, students, and visitors within and around the medical center grounds. Public Safety officers provide motorist assistance, lost and found, and night escort service for the campus. Although not a police department, many of the officers have arrest powers as Special State Police Officers. Officers on campus respond to high-stress and emergency situations on a daily basis and make frequent arrests of violators within and around the campus. The public safety department conducts investigations for violations of University and/or Hospital policies and procedures, and suspected criminal acts. This department is a separate entity from the Boston University Police Department.

== See also ==
- Boston Medical Center: affiliated with, but not a part of, Boston University
- Boston University School of Medicine
