= David Relman =

American microbiologist

David A. Relman
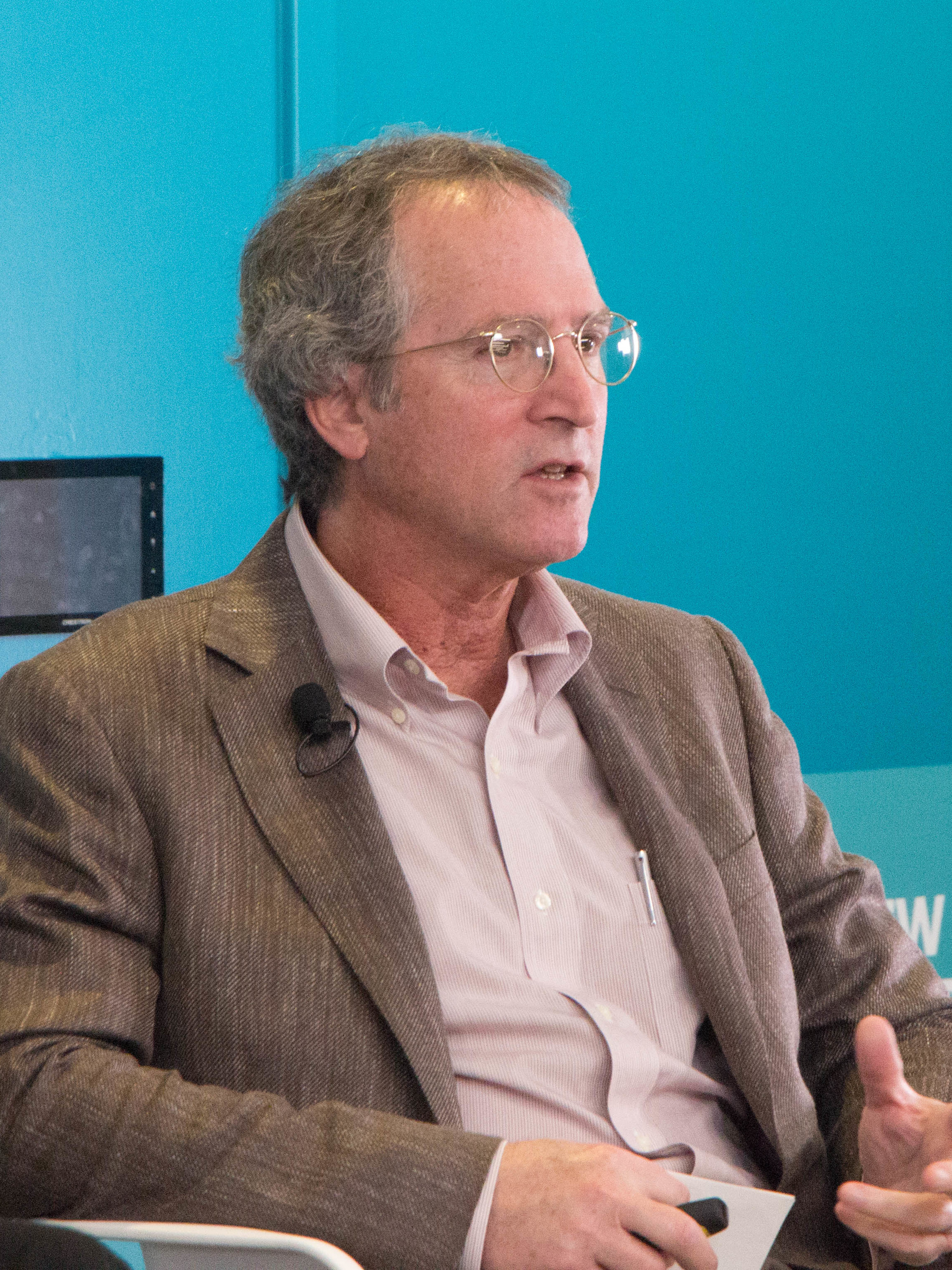
- Relman in 2018
- Born: Boston
- Education: MIT, Harvard University Medical School
- Known for: Study of the human microbiome
- Awards: Institute of Medicine (2011)
- Scientific career
- Fields: Microbiology
- Workplaces: Stanford University School of Medicine
- Website: relman.stanford.edu

David Arnold Relman is an American microbiologist and the Thomas C. and Joan M. Merigan Professor in Medicine, and in Microbiology & Immunology at the Stanford University School of Medicine. His research focuses on the human microbiome and microbial ecosystem—for which he was a pioneer in the use of modern molecular methods, as well as on pathogen discovery and the genomics of host response.

== Education ==
Relman was born in Boston, raised in Lexington, MA, and then moved to Philadelphia where he attended Germantown Friends School. He was an undergraduate at MIT and graduated in 1977. He attended medical school at the Harvard Medical School and received an M.D. degree, magna cum laude in 1982. He did his internship, residency, and a clinical infectious diseases fellowship year at Massachusetts General Hospital. He completed his infectious diseases and microbiology research training as a postdoctoral fellow with Stanley Falkow at Stanford University. He began his independent career as a physician-scientist with a research focus in microbial pathogenesis and soon thereafter became interested in the discovery and identification of previously-unrecognized microbial pathogens. The problem of differentiating novel pathogens from normal microbiota, the diversity of the indigenous microbiota, and the relationship of the latter with human health and disease, formed the basis of his subsequent research career.

== Academic career ==
Relman joined the faculty at Stanford University in 1994 and has remained there since. His development of broad range small subunit rRNA gene amplification methods for revealing novel microbial pathogens led to the identification of several important previously-uncharacterized human pathogens, including the agents of bacillary angiomatosis and of Whipple's disease. He was an early pioneer in the study of the human microbiome using these and other modern molecular methods, and published some of the first broad molecular surveys of the human oral and gut microbiota. His current research seeks to elucidate the nature and basis of diversity, assembly, stability and resilience in the human microbial ecosystem, and their relationships with health and disease. Relman became the Thomas C. and Joan M. Merigan Professor at Stanford in 2009.

Relman served as the science co-director of the Center for International Security and Cooperation at Stanford from 2013-2017 and he is currently a senior fellow at the Freeman Spogli Institute for International Studies and the Center for Innovation in Global Health. He serves as the Chief of Infectious Disease at the Veterans Affairs Palo Alto Health Care System. Relman has also served in a number of United States government advisory capacities, particularly on biosecurity issues.

Relman was elected a fellow of the American Academy of Microbiology in 2003, a fellow of the American Association for the Advancement of Science in 2010, a member of the Institute of Medicine (National Academy of Medicine) in 2011, and a member of the American Academy of Arts & Sciences in 2022. He received the Pioneer Award (2006) and the Transformative Research Award (2013) from the National Institutes of Health. He has served as the president of the Infectious Diseases Society of America in 2012-13, chair of the Forum on Microbial Threats at the National Academy of Medicine from 2007-2017, and a member of the Committee on Science, Technology and Law from 2012-2015 at the National Academies of Science (NAS). He is currently a member of the Intelligence Community Studies Board at NAS, the Science and Security Board of the Bulletin of the Atomic Scientists, and the Defense Science Board at the Department of Defense.

In 2019-20, Relman chaired a committee of the U.S. National Academies of Sciences, Engineering, and Medicine that examined unexplained clinical signs, symptoms, and findings amongst personnel and their families working for the U.S. Department of State in Havana and in China. The committee concluded in its report that, "Overall, directed pulsed RF energy ... appears to be the most plausible mechanism in explaining these cases among those that the committee considered" but that "each possible cause remains speculative" and that "the report should not be viewed as conclusive".

In 2020, Relman called for an objective, dispassionate, and transparent investigation into the origins of COVID-19 and SARS-CoV-2, noting that despite many strongly-worded opinions and assertions about the likelihood of various hypotheses, "the 'origin story' is missing many key details, including a plausible and suitably detailed recent evolutionary history of the virus, the identity and provenance of its most recent ancestors, and surprisingly, the place, time, and mechanism of transmission of the first human infection", and that natural and laboratory-associated "spillover" scenarios both remained plausible. He and colleagues in 2021 urged that greater clarity about the origins of the pandemic is necessary for anticipating the next pandemic and feasible.

== Personal life ==
Relman is the son of the late Arnold "Bud" Relman, longtime editor of the New England Journal of Medicine.

Relman was a long-time volunteer for the Rock Medicine program organized by the Haight Ashbury Free Clinics, and served as its Chief Medical Officer for about a decade 2006. In the 1990s he was featured on MTV for his work there, and he served as MTV's medical correspondent from 1995 to 1997.
