= BUMC =

BUMC may refer to:

== Organizations ==
- Banner University Medical Center, also known as Banner - University Medical Center Tucson (BUMCT), formerly University Medical Center and the University of Arizona Medical Center
- Baylor University Medical Center, part of Baylor Scott & White Health, is a not-for-profit hospital in Dallas, Texas
- Boston University Medical Campus, one of the two campuses of Boston University
- Boston University Medical Center, consortium of Boston University, via its Boston University School of Medicine, and Boston Medical Center
