= Female prostitution during the HIV/AIDS crisis in the United States =

During the US HIV/AIDS Crisis, female prostitutes were seen as vectors of the disease. While there is little reliable data to back up that perception, it can be directly linked to the criminalization of HIV and medical discrimination against prostitutes during the crisis. (Note: This article primarily discusses female prostitutes of the 1980s HIV/AIDS Crisis; to read about male prostitutes, see HIV/AIDS in the United States.) (Note: In this article, female is used to refer to cisgender women, and those with vaginal genitalia. This article does not include or represent the experience of the transgender community during the HIV/AIDS crisis.)

== Statistics ==
Laws criminalizing prostitution and societal stigmas against the sex trade made it difficult to collect accurate data about the rates of HIV among women exchanging sex during the HIV/AIDs health crisis. The numbers also likely vary heavily by state due to differences in population density, poverty rates, cultural values, education quality, and other factors. In 1987, the CDC published the results of a study of 2159 women engaged in the sex trade referred to them by law enforcement or medical clinics in coastal states (although only a portion of the data was used). Less than 12% tested positive for HIV, with the results varying from 0% to 57% by state. 76% of those who tested positive were also users of intravenous drugs. This suggests that unsterile needles may have been a greater risk factor than frequent sexual contact for those engaged in sexual labor, but with a lack of reliable data it is impossible to draw any firm conclusions. First hand accounts from those in the sex trade during the crisis are also largely absent. Most of the information about these women comes from court records and news reports from the time.

== Media coverage ==
During the HIV crisis, most media coverage of those in the sex trade was highly sensationalized, which exacerbated the negative public perception of the sex industry. News reports portrayed those arrested for selling sex as what lawyer and author Stephanie Kane called "the mythic prostitute:" they exist only for the purpose of having sex, without any non-sexual emotions or ambitions. When an HIV positive individual was arrested for the exchange of sex, it was vigorously reported, frequently villainizing the individual, and by association all prostitutes, as an active threat to public safety. Racial biases heavily influenced the extent and type of coverage those trading sex would receive from the media. White individuals in the sex trade were more likely to be painted in a semi-sympathetic light and described as mentally ill drug addicts, while those who were black and in the sex trade (and other people of color) were nearly always seen as malicious seducers actively seeking to spread HIV to innocent white women. While black media did not employ the same Jezebel stereotype as mainstream media, it did perpetuate the false dichotomy of 'evil' sex workers versus 'innocent' clients, as well as place an emphasis on protecting married women even though they were a relatively low-risk group.

== Legislation ==
According to Kane's theory, "the mythic prostitute" exists only to spread disease. Since HIV was almost always fatal, the exchange of sex was seen as equivalent to murder.

Multiple politically influential figures and journalists described having sex while HIV positive as equivalent to fatally shooting someone. By 1988, 13 states had passed laws codifying having sex with HIV as a felony, where selling sex was usually only a misdemeanor; those exchanging sex while positive for HIV were frequently charged with attempted murder. This approach was explicitly recommended by the Presidential Commission on the Human Immunodeficiency Virus Epidemic Report published in 1988. The commission wrote that "Penalties for prostitution are too lenient, and enforcement of prostitution laws are erratic." These recommendations became mandates two years later when the Ryan White CARE Act was passed, requiring states to demonstrate their capability to prosecute individuals who had sex while HIV positive in order to qualify for federal funding.

HIV criminalization laws frequently reproduced already-existing statistical biases of the justice system. Women who exchanged sex in public areas were disproportionately likely to be arrested compared to those who were not working outdoors. The enforcement of the laws also disproportionately targeted everyone working in the sex trade: despite the fact that those exchanging sex were far more likely to catch HIV from her client than the other way around, clients were almost never charged. Sentencing disparities between racial groups were glaring. Convicted white women were significantly more likely to be sent to a mental institution and receive HIV treatment, while black prostitutes were almost always jailed.

Critics have questioned the Constitutionality of many HIV criminalization laws. The Presidential Commission clarified that while having sex while HIV positive should be a felony, arrestee confidentiality should be respected, healthcare professionals should be consulted in sentencing, and only sex acts scientifically proven to spread HIV should be prosecuted. These recommendations were not taken into consideration by many states. The confidentiality of arrestees was not protected by the courts. Prostitutes often had incredibly personal information published in the press, including addresses and medical records. Courts also frequently ignored scientific evidence as to which acts could facilitate the transmission of HIV: in multiple cases, these women were charged for giving oral sex despite the fact that transmission from prostitute to client would be nearly impossible. HIV laws also set forward extremely low requirements for conviction. The prosecution did not have to prove that there was malicious intent, nor that the defendant had actually given anyone HIV, nor that the sex act in question could spread HIV. In most cases, being in the sex trade and having HIV was enough to receive a conviction.

== The medical community ==
Sex education during the 1980s tended to be abstinence-only. Conservative Christian values held by parents, teachers, state legislatures, and the presidential administration made it taboo to talk about sex at all, especially around children. This not only prevented teaching about safe sex in the classroom, but also in anything else that a child might see, including news broadcasts and CDC press releases. Dr. James Manson, head of the CDC under President Reagan, stated after the crisis that political pressure from the presidential administration heavily discouraged him from releasing specific information about how the virus was spread. While the CDC did recommend condom use, explicit information about how HIV spread never reached many US citizens. Proper sex education was heavily correlated with reduced occurrence of STIs for individuals exchanging sex. The perceived threat of the sex trade spreading HIV assumed that those trading sex understood how HIV spread, and were thus acting out of deliberate malice. However, due to poverty and lack of access to sex education, it is likely that many did not understand methods of safe sex. Accurate statistics on condom usage at the time were not gathered, but there were several legal cases against individuals who were HIV positive where they claimed their client refused to use a condom, despite their insistence, showing some understood the importance of condom usage.

During the early years of the US AIDS epidemic, there were a minority of doctors who refused to see any patient who had HIV, expressing a fear that they could catch HIV from their patient. In 1987, the American Medical Association publicly stated that "A physician may not ethically refuse to treat a patient whose condition is within the physician's current realm of competence solely because the patient is infected with HIV." However, doctors would also refuse to treat HIV positive patients on moral grounds. Patients who were in the sex trade, drug users, and/or part of the LGBTQIA+ were in some cases turned away or given inadequate medical treatment because healthcare professionals had moral objections to their behavior. The Presidential Commission's report explicitly condemned this practice. While only a minority of doctors would turn patients away, the frequency of more subtle medical discrimination during this time has gone largely uninvestigated. It is unknown whether or not perceived 'immoral' people were treated respectfully by doctors, and to what extent medical discrimination discouraged them from seeking treatment in the first place.

Medical research into human immunodeficiency virus was heavily stunted by the state of the publishing industry during the 1980s. Most respected medical journals had publication restrictions requiring that articles be peer reviewed and published by that journal before the researcher announced their results publicly (Ingelfinger Rule). Researchers who violated this rule would be blacklisted, which could spell the end of their career. This system existed, in part, to verify scientific claims before they were released to the general public, but it has been criticized for allowing journals exclusive coverage of the 'freshest' content as a means of boosting the journal's revenue. That sensationalism combined with the limited spaces for publication stunted critical research into HIV. Not only not released to the press, they were also kept secret from other researchers. A competitive publishing industry and the threat of blacklisting prevented scientists from sharing their unpublished research with colleagues even at medical conferences, hindering collaboration.
