= Goldman School =

Goldman School may refer to:

- Goldman School of Dental Medicine, the dental school of Boston University
- Goldman School of Public Policy, a public policy school at the University of California, Berkeley
