= Arnold S. Relman =

American internist, professor and journal editor (1923–2014)

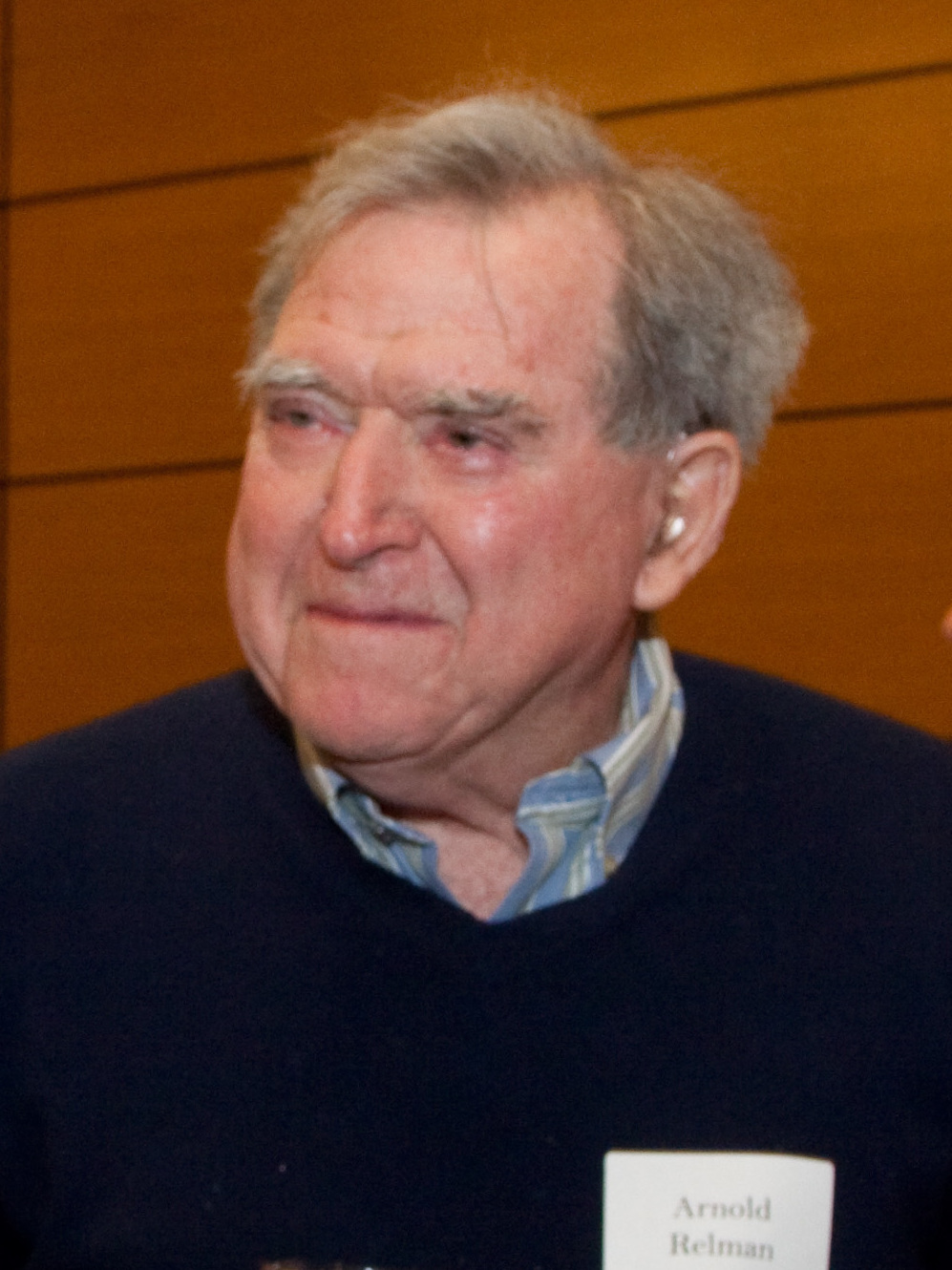
- Born: June 17, 1923; Queens, New York, US
- Died: June 17, 2014 (aged 91); Cambridge, Massachusetts, US
- Education: Cornell University; College of Physicians and Surgeons at Columbia University
- Known for: Editor of The New England Journal of Medicine; Contributions to medical education
- Scientific career
- Fields: Internal medicine, social medicine, education
- Workplaces: The New England Journal of Medicine

Arnold Seymour Relman (June 17, 1923 – June 17, 2014) — known as Bud Relman to intimates — was an American internist and professor of medicine and social medicine. He was editor of The New England Journal of Medicine (NEJM) from 1977 to 1991, where he instituted two important policies: one asking the popular press not to report on articles before publication and another requiring authors to disclose conflicts of interest. He wrote extensively on medical publishing and reform of the U.S. health care system, advocating non-profit delivery of single-payer health care. Relman ended his career as professor emeritus at Harvard Medical School in Boston, Massachusetts.

== Biography ==
Relman was born in Queens, New York, in 1923.

He was educated at Cornell University and the College of Physicians and Surgeons at Columbia University. After Medical school, he contracted tuberculosis. Although the antibiotic streptomycin had been developed by that time, Relman eschewed the opportunity to use it as he feared its toxic side effects. The years of rest without streptomycin delayed his career and during this time he read Thomas Mann's novel "Magic Mountain" about the experience of patients in a tuberculosis sanitarium. The work affected him greatly and he never failed to recommend the work to medical students on his service. He was first professor at Boston University School of Medicine, then Frank Wister Thomas professor of medicine and chair of the department of medicine at the University of Pennsylvania School of Medicine (now the Perelman School of Medicine), and finally a professor at Harvard Medical School.

Relman was editor of the Journal of Clinical Investigation from 1962 to 1967. He was editor of The New England Journal of Medicine (NEJM) from 1977 to 1991.

Relman was the only person to have been president of the American Federation for Clinical Research, the American Society for Clinical Investigation and the Association of American Physicians. In 1988 he was awarded Honorary Fellowship by the New York University School of Medicine.

Relman died in Cambridge, Massachusetts of melanoma in 2014 at the age of 91. He was married to Harriet Vitkin for 40 years, and together they had three children, David Relman, John Relman, and Margaret Relman Batten. His second wife Marcia Angell also served as editor of NEJM and was the first woman to do so.

== Views ==
=== On for-profit health care ===
Relman was an uncompromising critic of the American health care system as a profit-driven industry. He once said, "The medical profession is being bought by the pharmaceutical industry, not only in terms of the practice of medicine, but also in terms of teaching and research. The academic institutions of this country are allowing themselves to be the paid agents of the pharmaceutical industry. I think it’s disgraceful."

He coined the term "medical–industrial complex." He deplored the increasing treatment of health care in the US as a "market commodity" distributed according to a patient's ability to pay, not medical need. He believed that the solution would come only by two fundamental structural reforms: implementation of a single-payer financing system like Medicare without investor-owned private insurance companies and provision of a non-profit delivery system, with multi-specialty groups of physicians paid by salary within a preset budget.

In 1999, Relman participated in a Harvard Medical School debate on the subject of unionization of physicians and for-profit health care. His stance was described:

"Although he believes that managed care is here to stay, the current 'marketplace' state of health care is not viable. In order for the system to work, it is going to have to be 'not-for-profit, community-based, and run by doctors and local health care institutions with the support of community groups.' Keeping the big picture in mind, Relman said, 'Unions are unnecessary in a not-for-profit sector.'"

=== On alternative medicine ===
Relman was a decided skeptic regarding the alternative, complementary and integrative medicine movement. In 1998 he wrote:

There are not two kinds of medicine, one conventional and the other unconventional, that can be practiced jointly in a new kind of "integrative medicine." Nor...are there two kinds of thinking, or two ways to find out which treatments work and which do not. In the best kind of medical practice, all proposed treatments must be tested objectively. In the end, there will only be treatments that pass that test and those that do not, those that are proven worthwhile and those that are not. Can there be any reasonable "alternative"?

== Works ==
- Ingelfinger, Franz Josef; —; Finland, Maxwell, eds. (1966). Controversy in Internal Medicine. Vol. 1. Philadelphia: W.B. Saunders. OCLC 500690355.
- Ingelfinger, Franz Josef; —; Finland, Maxwell, eds. (1974). Controversy in Internal Medicine. Vol. 2. Philadelphia: W.B. Saunders. ISBN 9780721650265.
- Relman, Arnold S. "The New Medical-Industrial Complex". N Engl J Med 303(17):963-70, 1980. doi: 10.1056/NEJM198010233031703
- The Future of Medical Practice. Merrimon Lecture Series. Chapel Hill, NC: University of North Carolina; School of Medicine. 1982. OCLC 10027873.
- "Publishing Biomedical Research: Roles and responsibilities". Hastings Center Report. 20 (3): 23–7. May–June 1990. doi:10.2307/3563157. JSTOR 3563157. PMID 2376495.
- 10 Shattuck Street: Selected Editorials. Waltham, MA: Massachusetts Medical Society. 1991. ISBN 9780910133340.
- The Choices for Healthcare Reform. Camp Hill, PA: Pennsylvania Blue Shield Institute. 1992. OCLC 27164594.
- When More is Less: The Paradox of American Health Care and How to Resolve It. New York: W.W. Norton. 1997. ISBN 9780393035797.
- "A trip to Stonesville: Some notes on Andrew Weil". The New Republic. Vol. 219, no. 24. December 14, 1998. p. 28.
- Angell, Marcia; — (Spring 2002). "Patents, profits & American medicine: Conflicts of interest in the testing & marketing of new drugs" (PDF). Daedalus. 131 (2): 102–11. JSTOR 20027764.
- —; Angell, Marcia (December 16, 2002). "America's other drug problem: How the drug industry distorts medicine and politics" (PDF). The New Republic. Vol. 227, no. 25. pp. 27–41. PMID 12561803. Archived from the original (PDF) on February 17, 2015.
- "Restructuring the U.S. health care system". Issues in Science and Technology. 19 (4). September 2003.
- A Second Opinion: Rescuing America's Health Care. Century Foundation Books. New York: PublicAffairs. 2007. ISBN 9781586484811.
- Relman, Arnold (February 6, 2014). "On Breaking One's Neck". The New York Review of Books.
- "Physicians and politics". Invited Commentary. JAMA Internal Medicine. 174 (8): 1318–9. June 2, 2014. doi:10.1001/jamainternmed.2014.509. PMID 24887238.
