= Jonathan Wren =

Jonathan Wren may refer to:

- Jonathan Wren (biologist)
- Jonathan Wren (rugby union)
