= Gail D'Onofrio =

American physician-scientist and former nurse

- Spouse: Robert Steven Galvin
- Children: 3

Academic background
- Education: BSc, Duke University; MS, 1975, Boston University; MD, 1987, Boston University School of Medicine

Gail D'Onofrio is an American physician-scientist and former nurse. She is the Albert. E. Kent Professor of Emergency Medicine and Professor of Internal Medicine at the Yale School of Medicine, and Professor of Epidemiology (Chronic Disease) in the Yale School of Public Health. D'Onofrio was elected to the National Academy of Medicine in 2023 for her work in substance use disorders.

== Early life and education ==
D'Onofrio completed her Bachelor of Science degree from Duke University. She then earned her Master of Science at Boston University in 1975 and her medical degree at Boston University School of Medicine in 1987. Before starting her medical degree, she worked as a nurse, founded her own consulting firm, and worked as a consultant for Hewlett-Packard. D'Onofrio received the Distinguished Alumni Award from Boston University in 2022.

== Career ==
Following medical school, D’Onofrio completed her residency at Boston City Hospital during the 1980s cocaine epidemic. She described this time period as being "in the war zone every day" as she regularly treated patients for drug and alcohol use. D’Onofrio remained at Boston City Hospital/Boston Medical Center after her residency as a physician in their emergency department. While there, she discovered that the anti-anxiety drug lorazepam could prevent repeat seizures in alcoholics. She also helped implement Project ASSERT (Alcohol and Substance Abuse Services Education and Referral to Treatment) at Boston Medical Center. The purpose of the project was to help emergency department physicians screen patients for alcohol and drug issues and refer them to treatment programs. D’Onofrio continued Project ASSERT at Yale New Haven Hospital in December 1999 when she joined Yale University's faculty as an associate professor of medicine. She also co-developed emergency department screening techniques, including the Brief Negotiation Interview (BNI) and Screening, Brief Intervention, and Referral to Treatment (SBIRT). By 2005, she was promoted to acting chief of emergency medicine at Yale–New Haven Hospital.

In 2008, D’Onofrio and colleague David Fiellin received a grant from the National Institute on Drug Abuse to test screening and interventions for drug use in the emergency department. Their study found that patients with opioid use disorder who received an initial dose of buprenorphine followed by ongoing primary care management were twice as likely to remain in treatment after 30 days as those who did not receive buprenorphine. This research earned them the 2016 Dan Anderson Research Award from the Hazelden Betty Ford Foundation. In 2009, the Section of Emergency Medicine was elevated to full departmental status within the Yale School of Medicine. D’Onofrio continued to serve as chair of the department and chief of adult emergency services for Yale-New Haven Hospital. While serving in these roles, she also co-founded the American Board of Addiction Medicine. In 2013, D’Onofrio became the first woman to win the Society for Academic Emergency Medicine's (SAEM) Excellence in Research Award. A few years later, D'Onofrio received the SAEM's 2016 Advancement of Women in Academic Emergency Medicine Award in recognition of her "significant contributions to the advancement of women in academic emergency medicine."

D'Onofrio was appointed the Albert E. Kent Professor of Emergency Medicine in October 2020. She stepped down as Emergency Medicine Chair and chief of Emergency Services in December 2021. D'Onofrio was elected to the National Academy of Medicine in 2023 for her work in substance use disorders.

== Personal life ==
D'Onofrio and her husband Robert Galvin, a health care executive, have triplets together.
