= Marcia Angell =

American physician and academic (born 1939)

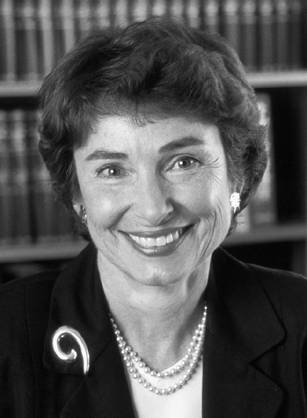
- Born: April 20, 1939 (age 87); Knoxville, Tennessee, U.S.
- Education: Boston University School of Medicine
- Occupations: Physician and author
- Known for: Former editor in chief of The New England Journal of Medicine

Marcia Angell (/ˈeɪndʒəl/; born April 20, 1939) is an American physician, author, and the first woman to serve as editor-in-chief of the New England Journal of Medicine. She is currently a Corresponding Member of the Faculty of Global Health and Social Medicine at Harvard Medical School in Boston, Massachusetts.

== Biography ==
After completing undergraduate studies in chemistry and mathematics at James Madison University in Harrisonburg, Virginia, Angell spent a year as a Fulbright Scholar studying microbiology in Frankfurt, Germany. After receiving her M.D. from Boston University School of Medicine in 1967, Angell trained in both internal medicine and anatomic pathology and is a board-certified pathologist.

Angell is a frequent contributor to medical journals as well as in the popular media, where she has offered her perspective on topics including medical ethics, health policy, psychiatry, the opioid epidemic, the nature of medical evidence, the interface of medicine and the law, and end-of-life healthcare. Her book, Science on Trial: The Clash of Medical Evidence and the Law in the Breast Implant Case (1996), received critical acclaim. With Stanley Robbins, and later with Vinay Kumar, she co-authored the first three editions of the textbook Basic Pathology. She has written chapters in several books dealing with ethical issues in medicine and healthcare.

Angell is a member of the Association of American Physicians, the Institute of Medicine of the National Academy of Sciences, the Alpha Omega Alpha National Honor Medical Society, and is a Master of the American College of Physicians. She is also a fellow of the Committee for the Scientific Investigation of Claims of the Paranormal and is an outspoken critic of medical quackery and the promotion of alternative medicine.

== New England Journal of Medicine tenure ==
Angell joined the editorial staff of The New England Journal of Medicine (NEJM) in 1979. She became Executive Editor in 1988, and served as interim Editor-in-Chief from 1999 until June 2000. The NEJM is the oldest continuously published medical journal, and one of the most prestigious; Angell is the first woman to have served as Editor-in-Chief of the journal since it was founded in 1812.

In 1999, Jerome P. Kassirer, M.D. resigned as NEJM's Editor-in-Chief following a dispute with the journal's publisher, the Massachusetts Medical Society, over its plan to use the journal's name to brand and market other sources of healthcare information. Angell agreed to serve as interim Editor-in-Chief until a permanent editor was chosen. She reached an agreement with the Society that the Editor-in-Chief would have authority over usage of the journal's name and logo, and that the journal's name would not be used on other products. She was a finalist for the permanent post of Editor-in-Chief, but withdrew as a candidate explaining that she was retiring to write a book on alternative medicine. Angell retired from the journal in June 2000 and was replaced by Jeffrey Drazen, M.D.

== Positions ==
=== Criticism of conflicts of interest and biases in the medical establishment ===
In her 2009 article "Drug Companies & Doctors: A Story of Corruption", published in The New York Review of Books (NYRB) magazine, Angell wrote:

...Similar conflicts of interest and biases exist in virtually every field of medicine, particularly those that rely heavily on drugs or devices. It is simply no longer possible to believe much of the clinical research that is published, or to rely on the judgment of trusted physicians or authoritative medical guidelines. I take no pleasure in this conclusion, which I reached slowly and reluctantly over my two decades as an editor of The New England Journal of Medicine .

=== Criticism of the Food and Drug Administration ===
Commenting on the 1992 Prescription Drug User Fee Act which allowed the Food and Drug Administration (FDA) to collect fees from drug manufacturers to fund the new drug approval process, Angell has stated :

It's time to take the Food and Drug Administration back from the drug companies...In effect, the user fee act put the FDA on the payroll of the industry it regulates. Last year, the fees came to about $300 million, which the companies recoup many times over by getting their drugs to market faster.

=== Criticism of U.S. healthcare system ===
Angell has long been a critic of the U.S. healthcare system, claiming that the system is in serious crisis. In a PBS special in 2000, she stated: "If we had set out to design the worst system that we could imagine, we couldn't have imagined one as bad as we have." In the PBS interview, she urged the nation to scrap its failing healthcare system and start over:

Our health care system is based on the premise that health care is a commodity like VCRs or computers and that it should be distributed according to the ability to pay in the same way that consumer goods are. That's not what health care should be. Health care is a need; it's not a commodity, and it should be distributed according to need. If you're very sick, you should have a lot of it. If you're not sick, you shouldn't have a lot of it. But this should be seen as a personal, individual need, not as a commodity to be distributed like other marketplace commodities. That is a fundamental mistake in the way this country, and only this country, looks at health care. And that market ideology is what has made the health care system so dreadful, so bad at what it does.

She later reiterated these points in an NYRB review of Steven Brill's book America's Bitter Pill (2015) about the passage of the Affordable Care Act: "his description of our dysfunctional health system is dead-on. He shows in all its horror how the way we distribute health care like a market commodity instead of a social good has produced the most expensive, inequitable, and wasteful health system in the world."

=== Criticism of the pharmaceutical industry ===
Angell is a critic of the pharmaceutical industry. In a 2002 New Republic article, she and Arnold S. Relman argued that drug companies exaggerated their R&D costs in order to justify their large profits: "The few drugs that are truly innovative have usually been based on taxpayer-supported research done in nonprofit academic medical centers or at the National Institutes of Health. In fact, many drugs now sold by drug companies were licensed to them by academic medical centers or small biotechnology companies." At the time, the pharmaceutical industry estimated that each new drug cost $800 million to develop and bring to market, but Angell and Relman estimated that the cost was closer to $100 million. She continued her inquiry into industry practices, eventually authoring the book The Truth About the Drug Companies: How They Deceive Us and What to Do About It (2004), with the following excerpt published in The New York Review of Books:

The combined profits for the ten drug companies in the Fortune 500 ($35.9 billion) were more than the profits for all the other 490 businesses put together ($33.7 billion) [in 2002]... Over the past two decades the pharmaceutical industry has moved very far from its original high purpose of discovering and producing useful new drugs. Now primarily a marketing machine to sell drugs of dubious benefit, this industry uses its wealth and power to co-opt every institution that might stand in its way, including the US Congress, the FDA, academic medical centers, and the medical profession itself. (Most of its marketing efforts are focused on influencing doctors, since they must write the prescriptions.) If prescription drugs were like ordinary consumer goods, all this might not matter very much. But drugs are different. People depend on them for their health and even their lives. In the words of Senator Debbie Stabenow (D-Mich.), “It’s not like buying a car or tennis shoes or peanut butter.” People need to know that there are some checks and balances on this industry, so that its quest for profits doesn’t push every other consideration aside. But there aren’t such checks and balances.

Richard Friedman, director of the psychopharmacology clinic at Weill Cornell Medical College, and a regular contributor to The New York Times science pages, criticized Angell's views as one-sided: "Dr. Angell is now doing pretty much the same thing the industry she assails has done, just the converse. Pharma withheld the bad news about its drugs and touted the positive results; Dr. Angell ignores positive data that conflicts with her cherished theory and reports the negative results.”

=== Views on alternative medicine ===
Marcia Angell is also a critic of the current categorization of alternative medicine. In a 1998 NEJM editorial, she and Jerome Kassirer asserted:

It is time for the scientific community to stop giving alternative medicine a free ride. There cannot be two kinds of medicine — conventional and alternative. There is only medicine that has been adequately tested and medicine that has not, medicine that works and medicine that may or may not work. Once a treatment has been tested rigorously, it no longer matters whether it was considered alternative at the outset. If it is found to be reasonably safe and effective, it will be accepted.

== Awards and honors ==
In 1997, Time magazine named Marcia Angell one of the 25 most influential Americans for that year.

== Works ==
- Basic Pathology 1st edition (1971, Robbins, Stanley Leonard; Angell, Marcia); 2nd ed. (1973, Robbins, S.L.; Angell, M.); 3rd ed. (1981, Robbins, S.L.; Angell, M. Kumar, Vinay)
- Science on Trial: The Clash of Medical Evidence and the Law in the Breast Implant Case. Norton. 1996. ISBN 9780393039733.
- The Truth About the Drug Companies: How They Deceive Us and What to Do About It. Random House. 2004. ISBN 9780375508462.
