= Robert Nason Nye =

American pathologist

Robert Nason Nye (June 3, 1892–1947) was an American pathologist. He edited the New England Journal of Medicine and was a member of the American Association for the Advancement of Science, the American Association of Pathologists and Bacteriologists, and the American Association of Immunologists. He was educated at Harvard College, graduating cum laude in 1913, and then attended Harvard Medical School.
