= Franz J. Ingelfinger =

German-American physician

Franz Joseph Ingelfinger (August 20, 1910 – March 27, 1980) was a German-American physician, researcher and journal editor. He served as Chief of Gastroenterology at Evans Memorial Department of Clinical Research, part of Boston University School of Medicine. He also served as Editor of the New England Journal of Medicine (NEJM) from 1967 to 1976. His work was influential in the field of science journalism.

== Life and career ==
Ingelfinger was born in 1910 in Dresden, Germany, the only child of Eleanor Holden and Joseph Franz Ingelfinger. He came to the United States with his family in the early 1920s to live in his mother's home town of Swampscott, Massachusetts where his German father established a general practice as a physician. After initially wanting to enter the business world, faced with dwindling job opportunities after the Wall Street crash he decided to follow in his father and go into medicine. Ingelfinger earned diplomas from Phillips Andover Academy, followed by Yale University in 1932 and Harvard Medical School in 1936.

The Ingelfinger rule is named after him. In 1969, one of Ingelfinger's first acts as editor of NEJM was to draw up rules for authors forbidding prior submission or publication of their work in other media. This stipulation for authors and the related press embargo were designed to ensure that the articles published were original and "newsworthy." It also helped prevent what later NEJM editors called science by press conference, the practice of going directly to the media with scientific results rather than waiting for the peer review process designed to check the work for errors and flaws. He used catchy titles for his editorials; for example in 1973, when Clean Air Act standards were lowered during the energy crisis: "Fighting carcinogens with underwear".

He served as president of the American Gastroenterological Association. In 1979 he was presented the George Kober Medal of the Association of American Physicians, given to leaders in academic medicine, research and teaching. He died in 1980, aged 69 from complications of esophageal cancer in Boston, Massachusetts.
