= Ida Joe Brooks =

American educator, physician and surgeon

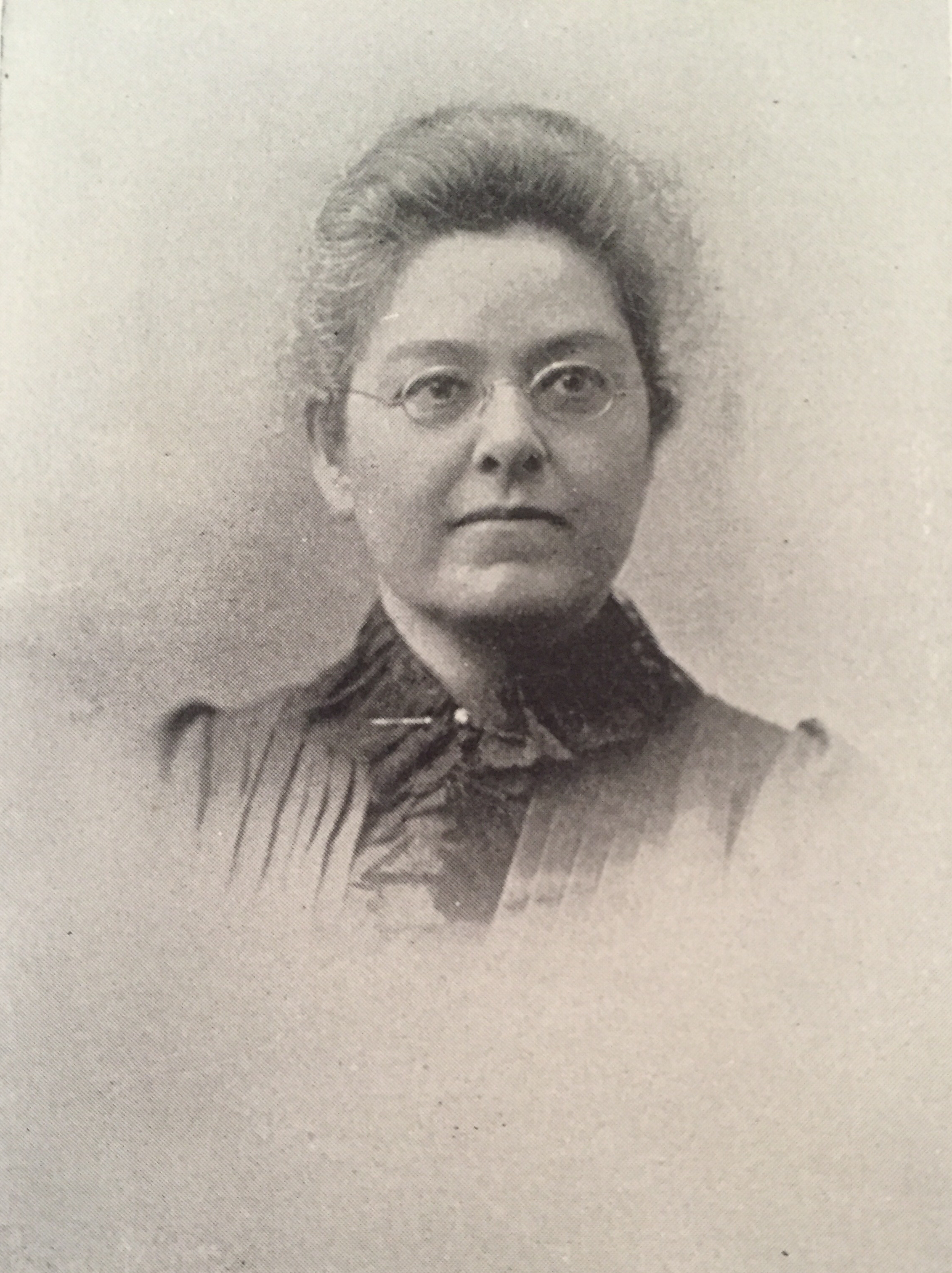
Ida Joe Brooks

Ida Josephine "Joe" Brooks (April 28, 1853 – March 13, 1939) was an educator, physician and surgeon. She was among Arkansas's earliest women physicians and the first female faculty member at the University of Arkansas Medical School.

== Early life ==
Ida Josephine Brooks was born in Muscatine, Iowa, on April 28, 1853. She was the daughter of Rev. Joseph Brooks, a Methodist minister, and Elizabeth Goodenough. Her father was the governor candidate for Arkansas in 1872, against Elisha Baxter, who in the end was the winner. When she was very young, her parents moved to St. Louis, Missouri, and she there entered the public schools, beginning in the primary department of the Clay school, when Dr. William Torrey Harris began his career as a teacher. She graduated from Central High School in St. Louis in 1870. Her father moved to the South after Civil War, and Brooks went to Little Rock, Arkansas, in 1870.

In 1877 she obtained an AB degree from Little Rock University, a private college. She taught in Little Rock public schools while continuing her studies at Drury College in Springfield, Missouri, obtaining her master's degree.

== Career ==
In 1872, in conversation with a friend, Brooks warmly argued that women should earn their own money, and he made a wager that she would not do it herself. As a joke, he found her a school in Fouche Bottom, where the gnats were so thick that a smudge had to be kept continually burning. She accepted the position and taught there faithfully and well.

In 1873, Brooks, with a liking for the work, began to teach at the Primary Department of the First Ward School, Little Rock. The following year she was made principal of the grammar school, and in 1876 she was made principal of the Little Rock High School. In 1877 she was elected president of the State Teachers' Association. She was also president of the Homeopathic Medical Examining Board.

In 1882, Brooks joined the faculty at Little Rock University. Having become a Master of Arts, she was placed in charge of the mathematical department, where she taught until 1888 when she entered the Boston University School of Medicine, a course which had for years been her desire. She was graduated there with high honors in 1891 and afterwards took a post-graduate course on nervous diseases in the Westborough Insane Hospital. She spent one year as house officer in the Massachusetts Homeopathic Hospital, being assigned half the time on the surgical and half the time on the medical work. Returning to Little Rock in 1903, she established a private practice of pedriatics.

Brooks was a woman suffragist and a temperance advocate.

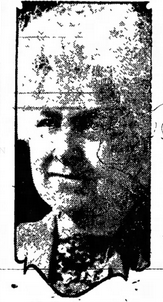
Ida Joe Brooks (1922)

In 1914, Brooks joined the faculty of the University of Arkansas for Medical Sciences, the first female faculty member. She was a lecturer on social hygiene in the psychiatry department and later became associate professor of psychiatry.

She was nominated to the office of State Superintendent of Public Instruction in 1920, but at the time women couldn't compete and her name was taken off the ballot.

She was member of the Altrusa Club and the Woman's City Club of Little Rock.

== Personal life ==
Brooks tried to enlist in the military service during World War I, but was rejected because she was a woman. She obtained a commission in the United States Public Health Service and served at Camp Pike.

She died on March 13, 1939, and is buried at Bellefontaine Cemetery, St. Louis.
