= Louis Weinstein =

American physician (1908–2000)

- Born: February 26, 1908; Bridgeport, Connecticut, U.S.
- Died: March 16, 2000 (aged 92)
- Education: Yale University; Boston University School of Medicine
- Medical career
- Profession: Physician
- Field: Microbiology
- Institutions: Boston University School of Medicine; Haynes Memorial Hospital; Tufts Medical Center; Brigham and Women's Hospital; Harvard Medical School
- Sub-specialties: Infectious diseases

Louis Weinstein (February 26, 1908 – March 16, 2000) was an American infectious diseases physician, microbiologist, and educator. He was a pioneer in the modern field of infectious disease treatment, having started his career before antibiotics and vaccines became widely available. Over his career he taught at the three medical schools in Boston: Boston University School of Medicine, Tufts University School of Medicine, and Harvard Medical School, making him one of the few doctors to do so. During his lifetime, he wrote or co-wrote more than 400 articles published in professional journals.

== Biography ==
Weinstein was born in 1908 in Bridgeport, Connecticut. He received a masters and doctorate in microbiology at Yale University, financing his studies by working as a jazz violinist. He graduated from Boston University School of Medicine in 1943, and was appointed chief of infectious disease at the university in 1947. He worked for twelve years at Haynes Memorial Hospital in Boston, where he treated thousands of patients with various infectious diseases. In 1957, he transferred to Tufts Medical Center as chief of infectious diseases for adult medicine and pediatrics, and remained there until moving to Brigham and Women's Hospital in 1975. He concurrently served as a visiting professor in infectious diseases to Harvard Medical School from 1975 to 1993.

Weinstein, who began working in the pre-antibiotic era, encouraged physicians to prescribe antibiotics such as penicillin and helped to develop guidelines for antibiotic therapy. By the end of the 1940s, he became one of the first physicians to also warn against the overuse of antibiotics and the dangers of antibiotic resistance. Fellow Boston infectious diseases physician Morton N. Swartz described Weinstein as "a bridge between the eras before and after the introduction of antibiotics". He played a significant role in the New England polio epidemics of 1949 and 1955; when obstetricians refused to see polio-infected pregnant women because they feared viral transmission, Weinstein delivered the babies. He traveled across New England to make house calls, and on one occasion was summoned to Paris to treat Aristotle Onassis for pneumonia. He chaired a Centers for Disease Control and Prevention advisory committee on the Legionnaires' disease outbreak in Philadelphia in 1976.
