= Edward Avedisian (clarinetist) =

American clarinetist and philanthropist (1937–2022)

- Born: June 23, 1937; Pawtucket, Rhode Island, U.S.
- Died: December 7, 2022 (aged 85); Lexington, Massachusetts, U.S.
- Education: Boston University
- Occupations: Clarinetist, private investor, philanthropist
- Spouse: Pamela Wood
- Awards: Ellis Island Medal of Honor (2016)

Edward Avedisian (June 23, 1937 – December 7, 2022) was an American clarinetist, private investor, and philanthropist. He performed as a musician with the Boston Pops Orchestra and the Boston Ballet Orchestra for several decades. Through self-taught investing, Avedisian amassed a fortune that he dedicated to educational initiatives in the United States and Armenia.

He is one of the namesakes of the Boston University Aram V. Chobanian & Edward Avedisian School of Medicine, following a $100 million donation he made to the university in 2022.

== Early life and education ==
Avedisian was born on June 23, 1937, in Pawtucket, Rhode Island. His parents, Khoren and Shooshanig Avedisian, were survivors of the Armenian genocide. He grew up in an immigrant neighborhood and attended Pawtucket public schools, graduating as the president of his high school class in 1955.

Avedisian earned a bachelor's degree in 1959 and a master's degree in 1961, both in music, from the Boston University College of Fine Arts. Following his graduation, he received an RCA scholarship for advanced orchestral training at the Tanglewood Music Center, where he was twice appointed a Fromm Fellow for contemporary music performance under the direction of Aaron Copland.

== Musical career and investing ==
Avedisian worked as a professional clarinetist for more than 40 years. He performed with the Boston Pops Orchestra for 35 years and the Boston Ballet Orchestra for 43 seasons. During his career, he also played with the Atlanta Symphony, the North Carolina Symphony, the Boston Opera Company, and the Boston Lyric Opera, and served as a substitute musician for the Boston Symphony Orchestra and the Metropolitan Opera.

Parallel to his career as a musician, Avedisian became a self-taught private investor in the stock market. Over several decades, his investments yielded significant returns, generating the wealth that would later fund his major philanthropic endeavors.

== Philanthropy ==
=== Boston University ===
In September 2022, Avedisian donated $100 million to the Boston University School of Medicine. The gift was allocated toward financial aid, scholarships, endowed professorships, and research funds. Avedisian initially requested the medical school be named in honor of his lifelong friend, Aram V. Chobanian, the ninth president of Boston University and former dean of the medical school. Chobanian agreed on the condition that Avedisian's name was also included, resulting in the school's new name: the Boston University Aram V. Chobanian & Edward Avedisian School of Medicine.

=== Armenian causes ===
Avedisian was a major benefactor to the Republic of Armenia following its independence. He funded the Khoren and Shooshanig Avedisian School and Community Center in Yerevan, named after his parents. He also served on the Board of Trustees for the American University of Armenia (AUA), where he established endowed professorships and funded the Zvart Avedisian Onanian Center for Health Services Research and Development. In the United States, he was the principal benefactor for the National Association for Armenian Studies and Research (NAASR) headquarters in Belmont, Massachusetts.

=== Other institutions ===
Avedisian made a $5 million gift to the University of Rhode Island (URI) College of Pharmacy in memory of his brother, Paramaz Avedisian; the pharmacy building now bears his brother's name. He also funded the Zvart Onanian School of Nursing at Rhode Island College and endowed chairs in the Boston Ballet Orchestra.

== Personal life ==
Avedisian was married to Pamela Wood. He was awarded the Ellis Island Medal of Honor in 2016 for his philanthropic contributions. Avedisian died from pulmonary health issues on December 7, 2022, at his home in Lexington, Massachusetts, at the age of 85.
