= Thomas C. Merigan =

American physician-scientist who studied viruses in patients

Thomas Charles Merigan (born January 18, 1934 in San Francisco) is an American virologist and the George E. and Lucy Becker Professor of Medicine, Emeritus at the Stanford University School of Medicine.

Merigan's research first focused on human viral pathogenesis, basic and clinical studies of interferon, and then developing the first systemically active antiviral drugs including those effectively treating HIV/AIDS, several herpesviruses and hepatitis B. He is also credited with helping to develop the use of interferons as antiviral, immunomodulating and antitumor therapies. Merigan joined the Stanford faculty in 1963 and assumed full emeritus status in 2007. In 2004 he was also identified as one of the 250 most cited investigators in clinical medicine over the last 20 years by the Institute for Scientific Information. Merigan also was ranked 23rd among the 1000 top US microbiologists by Research.com in 2022. His papers were cited over 37,000 times. Two of his books went into multiple editions- one into a 4th edition and the other into a 3rd. He was a board member of 28 journals and a member of 23 learned societies. He had over 95 fellows, students and research associates with whom he wrote 576 papers, 26 books and published symposia and 11 patents. Seven of his students became fulltime faculty in the Stanford School of Medicine. He told his life story in a book entitled Pioneering Viral Therapy, a Life in Academic Medicine, published by Amazon/Kindle/CreateSpace in 2017.

== Education ==
Merigan was an undergraduate at the University of California, Berkeley and graduated B.A. with honors in 1955. He attended medical school at the University of California, San Francisco, where he was elected to Alpha Omega Alpha medical honor society and received his M.D. with honors in 1958. He did his internship and residency on the Harvard medical services at Boston City Hospital and then moved to the National Institutes of Health in Bethesda where he trained for 3 years in protein chemistry in Nobelist Christian Anfinsen's laboratory.

== Academic career ==
Merigan joined the faculty at Stanford in 1963. His first sabbatical leave was spent at the MRC Common Cold Unit in Salisbury and London, England in 1970 with David Tyrell and Sir Christopher Andrews under a Guggenheim fellowship. He received the Borden Award for outstanding research from the Association of American Medical Colleges in 1973. Another overseas sabbatical was spent studying basic aspects of interferon with Professor Charles Chany in Paris. He became involved in administration at Stanford and headed the Division of Infectious Diseases for 28 years and founded the Stanford University Hospital Clinical Virology Laboratory in 1969, then one of the first of its type in the world. In 1988 he founded the Center for AIDS Research at Stanford which he directed for almost 20 years. The antivirals he collaborated in the development of include those directed against herpesviruses (CMV, VZ, and HSV), hepatitis B, papovaviruses, rhinoviruses, HIV, and rabies. They were carried out not just at Stanford but on 6 of the 7 continents of the world.

His interferon studies included finding the first positive treatment results in hepatitis B and cytomegalovirus infections and multiple sclerosis. This encouraged others to find even better effects with immunomodulators in the latter disease with less toxic drugs. He directed the studies that allowed the licensing of the first drug active against CMV, gancylovir. Here he observed that treating CMV also decreased the incidence of fungal and other infections and improved the graft. His group also developed, tested, and held patents through Stanford University on the methods for monitoring the effects of treatment of HIV which are still used today. Due to his involvement in the study of HIV/AIDS, he also became involved in government initiatives; he was a principal investigator and initial chair of the Primary Infection (HIV) Committee in the National Institute of Allergy and Infectious Diseases (NIAID) AIDS Clinical Trials Group. This committee under him evaluated the first active antiviral drugs against HIV and proved the better action of combination over monotherapy of HIV infection in large-scale multinational studies.

He served on several NIH study sections, FDA Committees, and as a member of NIAID's Board of Scientific Counselors. He held grants from that Institute continuously from the day in 1963 he started at Stanford until he retired nearly 45 years later. In 1988 he received a ten-year MERIT grant award from the NIAID and received the Maxwell Finland Lectureship award from IDSA. He gave a number of named endowed lectureships in the US and elsewhere and also on several occasions testified before congressional committees on the subject of oncoming needs for federal funding for both AIDS and cancer research. His testimony led directly to Tip O’Neil's putting forth a bill which both houses of congress and President Reagan quickly signed off on creating the NCI's Frederich Cancer Center. His work with CMV led to his advising on the Polish Pope John Paul's care after he was shot. His advice to Singapore's Lee Quan Yu to further develop his biotech university led to one of the world's best schools in that area.

In 1980 Merigan became the first George E. and Lucy Becker Professor of Medicine and in 1981 was elected to the National Academy of Medicine. He was made a Fellow of the American Association for the Advancement of Science, American Society for Microbiology, Infectious Diseases Society of America, and American Society of Virology as well as elected into honorary membership in the International Society for Interferon and Cytokine Research in 2001 . He served as a member of the Council of the American Society for Clinical Investigation and a member of the Association of American Physicians. Tom served as a member of several scientific award groups including the Lasker Awards Committee. He also was boarded in Internal Medicine. Merigan was among the group of American virologists who helped organize and became the founding members of the American Society for Virology.

Merigan was also interested in entrepreneurship throughout his career and served on the scientific advisory boards of a number of big pharma and biotechnology companies, Including those of Cetus Corporation in 1979. and Bristol-Myers Squibb Corporation in 1989.

In 2004, Merigan assumed active emeritus status in the Stanford faculty, celebrated by a Festschrift in his honor later published in the Journal of Infectious Diseases.(2) His fellows also endowed an annual lecture in his name which has brought 27 speakers to Stamford. He remained active in research until he retired fully in 2007. The following year he and his first wife endowed the Thomas C. and Joan M. Merigan Chair in infectious diseases at Stanford, currently held by David Relman. In 2022 he and his then wife Sue started funding the Sue Merigan Student Scholarship aimed at Stanford undergraduates and medical students interested in training in infectious diseases research.
