= William Lane Watkins =

American physician

Personal details
- Born: William Lane Watkins; November 26, 1852 Baltimore, Maryland
- Died: December 31, 1929 (aged 77) Mitchellville, Maryland
- Spouse: Jane E Turner
- Children: Wilson Watkins, Susie J (Watkins) Owens, William C. Watkins, Maud Watkins, Blanch Watkins, Harry Brook Watkins
- Parent(s): William H Watkins, Susan M Bowie (also spelled Buoy, Bowy, Bone or Bonie)
- Education: New Bedford High School; Boston University School of Medicine
- Profession: Physician, schoolteacher

William Lane Watkins (1852-1929) was an African American physician and schoolteacher. He practiced medicine and was the teacher and principal of Mt. Nebo School for Colored Children in Prince George's County, Maryland, and was the first black man to graduate from the Boston University School of Medicine.

== Family, early life and education ==
William L Watkins was born in Baltimore, Maryland, in 1852. His father, William H Watkins, was a white man, born in Baltimore in about 1821. His mother, Susan Marie Bowie, was a mixed-race woman born into slavery in Prince George's County in about 1829. Prince George's County, in southern Maryland, was tobacco-producing country, where the majority of black residents in the early- to mid-1800s were enslaved, and the circumstances under which Susan escaped slavery are unclear. Since marriage between black and white persons was illegal in Maryland at the time, their marriage was not formally recorded and the date and location is unknown.

The family moved to New Bedford, Massachusetts, when William L Watkins was a child, and his father worked as a city messenger there, while his mother kept house. William Lane Watkins attended New Bedford High School, graduating in July, 1872. In 1873 he became a member of the first class to be accepted into the newly formed Boston University School of Medicine, and he graduated in 1876, the first black man to receive an MD from the school. (Rebecca Lee Crumpler, who received an MD from the New England Female Medical College in 1864, is considered the school's first black female graduate.)

His medical school thesis, on an herb called jaborandi, was published as an article by the homeopathic journal New England Medical Gazette in 1876: this is his only known publication.

== Career ==
Unable to establish a medical practice in Massachusetts, Watkins moved back to Baltimore after receiving his degree and found work in the U.S. Customs Office, where he met a trustee of the Mt. Nebo African Methodist Episcopal (A.M.E.) church with an interest in the newly established Mount Nebo (Colored) Elementary School in Queen Anne Town (now Queen Anne, Maryland), Prince George's County. He accepted a position as schoolteacher and boarded for a time with Wilson Turner, a trustee of the school, and his family. In 1878, he married Wilson Turner's daughter Jane E Turner, and the two eventually had 10 children, of whom 6 are known to have survived infancy. The family faced down white opposition in order to move into the Queen Anne city limits from the countryside where black residents of the county then lived. Jane Watkins was postmistress for Queen Anne circa 1890-1911, and William Watkins served as the local doctor, managed the Mount Nebo Elementary School, and was politically active in the Maryland Republican party. He was one of the first African Americans to serve as a delegate to the Republican Central Committee for the state, and was nominated as a candidate from Bowie as late as 1921.

== Later life and legacy ==
Two of the Watkins daughters died in the 1918-1920 influenza pandemic, leaving Dr. and Mrs. Watkins to raise two grandsons. William Watkins lived in Prince George's County until his death in 1929 at age 77.

In 2022, Boston University's Chobanian & Avedisian School of Medicine recognized Watkins with an exhibit at the school's Alumni Memorial Library.
