= Jonathan Wren (biologist) =

Jonathan Daniel Wren
- Education: University of Texas Southwestern Medical Center, University of Oklahoma
- Known for: data mining, genetics
- Scientific career
- Workplaces: Oklahoma Medical Research Foundation
- Thesis: The IRIDESCENT System: An Automated Data-Mining Method to Identify, Evaluate, and Analyze Sets of Relationships Within Textual Databases (2003)
- Doctoral advisor: Harold Garner

Jonathan D. Wren is a scientific investigator at the Oklahoma Medical Research Foundation in the Department of Arthritis and Clinical Immunology, and an Adjunct Assistant Professor in the Department of Biochemistry and Molecular Biology at the University of Oklahoma Health Sciences Center.

Wren received his Ph.D. in Genetics and Development at the University of Texas Southwestern Medical Center in 2003, and immediately after began his independent research career at the University of Oklahoma. He moved to OMRF in 2007. His bioinformatics research focuses on developing computational methods of inferring logical conclusions from extremely large bodies of unstructured or semi-structured measurements and/or facts. He has been recognized for his work in text mining, studies on URL decay (link rot) in scientific publications, plagiarism detection and for discovering the function of uncharacterized human genes. Wren is an Associate Editor for the journal Bioinformatics.
