= Pulmonary Pharmacology & Therapeutics =

- Discipline: Pulmonology, pharmacology
- Language: English
- Edited by: Estelle Cormet-Boyaka

Publication details
- Former name(s): Pulmonary Pharmacology
- History: 1988-present
- Publisher: Elsevier
- Frequency: Bimonthly
- Impact factor: 3.410 (2020)

Standard abbreviations
- ISO 4: Pulm. Pharmacol. Ther.

Indexing
- CODEN: PPTHFJ
- ISSN: 1094-5539 (print); 1522-9629 (web)
- OCLC no.: 37222055

Links
- Journal homepage; Online access; Online archive of Pulmonary Pharmacology

Pulmonary Pharmacology & Therapeutics is a medical journal published by Elsevier that covers research on the pharmacotherapy of lung diseases. It was established in 1988 as Pulmonary Pharmacology and obtained its current title in 1997.
