= Karen H. Antman =

American physician

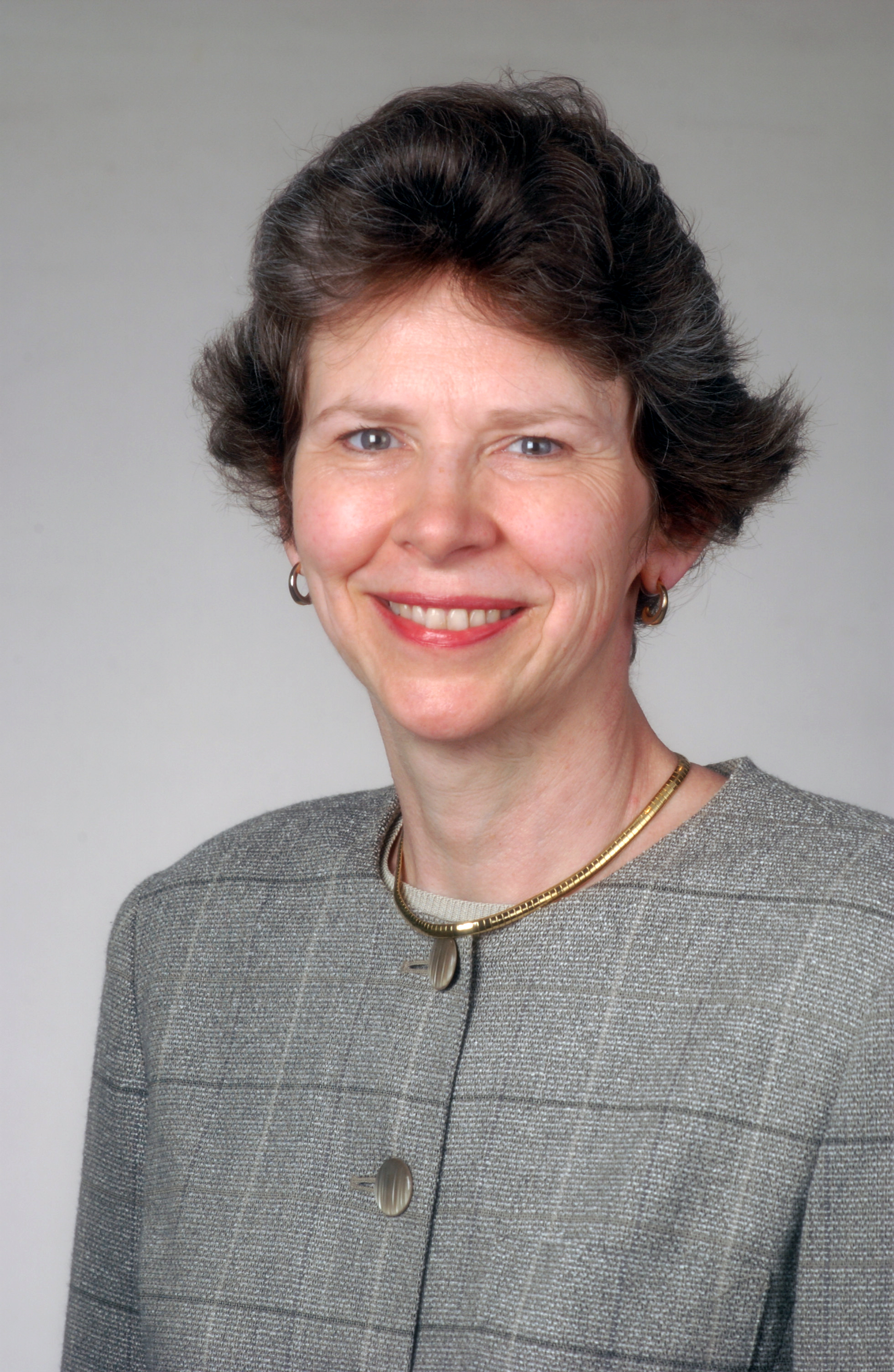
- Occupations: Physician and college administrator
- Known for: Dean of Boston University School of Medicine and Provost of the Boston University Medical Campus

Karen H. Antman is an American physician. She is the dean emeritus of Boston University School of Medicine and former provost of the Boston University Medical Campus.
