= Boston University Police Department =

Police department for Boston University

- Abbreviation: BUPD

Agency overview
- Formed: 1947
- Legal personality: Non-governmental: Body corporate

Jurisdictional structure
- Operations jurisdiction: United States
- Population: 42,000
- Legal jurisdiction: Campus of Boston University
- General nature: Civilian police

Operational structure
- Headquarters: Boston, Massachusetts
- Police officers: 52
- Administrative employees: 16
- Agency executive: Rob Lowe, Chief

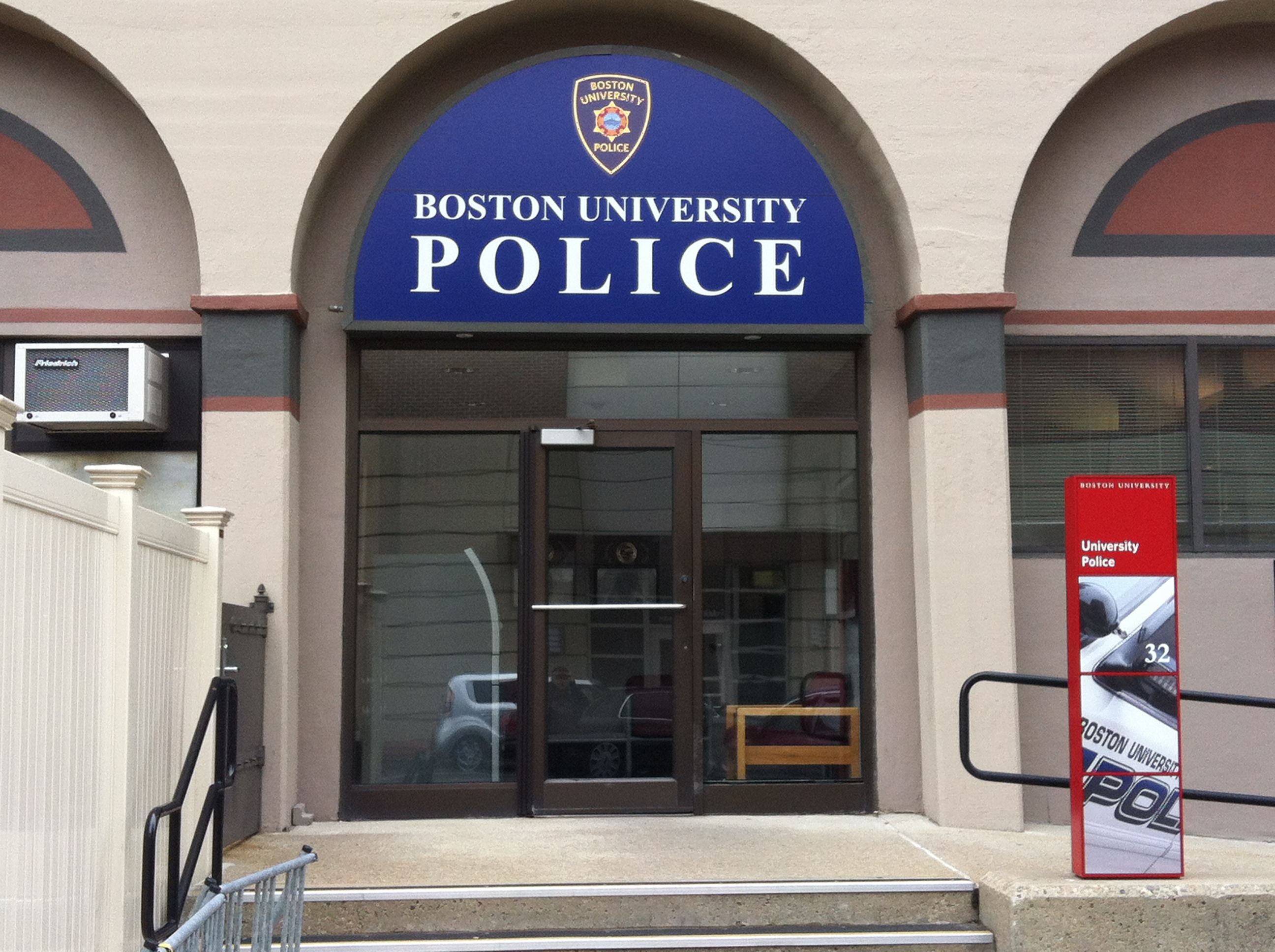
The headquarters of the Boston University Police Department at 32 Harry Agganis Way

The Boston University Police Department (BUPD) is the primary law-enforcement agency of Boston University and provides services to more than 41,000 students, faculty, and staff on 132 acres (0.53 km^{2}) of University property and surrounding streets. Its headquarters are located at 32 Harry Agganis Way adjacent to Nickerson Field, in what was once the Braves Field ticket office.

== History ==
The BUPD was created through an act of legislation in October 1947.

In 2005 a former deputy chief sued the university after being laid off by Chief Robert T. Shea in 2002. A Massachusetts Superior Court judge dismissed the case but wrote that the plaintiff "reasonably ... believed that BU and Shea were engaged in wrongful discrimination."

In 2006, Boston University hired the superintendent of the Massachusetts State Police, Thomas G. Robbins, as Chief of BUPD and Executive Director of Public Safety.

== Organization ==
The department employs 50 sworn personnel and a complement of 10 civilian support staff. Specialized units include a Detective Bureau, a Mountain Bike Unit, a Training and Development Unit, and Community Oriented Policing Services. The department provides services to 33,000 Boston University students; 9,300 faculty and staff members; and campus visitors.

== Authority ==
All BUPD police are sworn "special State Police officers" and have full arrest authority on Boston University property and adjoining streets. The authority of the BUPD is derived from chapter 22C, section 63 of the General Laws of Massachusetts.

Additionally, all Boston University Police Officers hold commissions as deputy sheriffs in the counties of Suffolk, Middlesex, and Norfolk, giving them arrest powers throughout Boston, Cambridge, and Brookline, where BU has facilities.

== See also ==
- Campus police
