= Harold Garner =

American physicist

Academic background
- Education: University of Missouri, Rolla; University of Wisconsin–Madison
- Thesis: Low frequency turbulence, particle and heat transport in the Wisconsin Levitated Octupole (1982)

Academic work
- Institutions: University of Texas Southwestern Medical Center; Virginia Tech; Edward Via College of Osteopathic Medicine
- Notable students: Jonathan Wren

Harold Ray Garner (born 5 February 1954), known informally as "Skip", is a biophysicist with research careers in plasma physics, bioengineering and bioinformatics. Garner was born in St. Louis, Missouri. He received his B.S. degree in Nuclear Engineering (minor in computer science) at the University of Missouri, Rolla in 1976 and a PhD in plasma/high temperature matter physics from the University of Wisconsin–Madison in 1982. He also holds an honorary professional engineering degree also from the University of Missouri, Rolla.

== General Atomics ==
From 1982 to 1994, Garner was a scientist at General Atomics in San Diego where he conducted experimental and theoretical research for the Department of Energy at international fusion research facilities. In his last six years at GA, he was a founding member of "The Institute", an internal think tank, where he developed artificial intelligence/expert systems, new particle accelerators, high temperature superconductors, stealth/defense technologies and biology software and instrumentation.

== University of Texas Southwestern Medical Center ==
From 1994 to 2009, Garner held the P. O’B. Montgomery, M.D., Distinguished Chair, and was a professor of biochemistry and internal medicine, a member of the McDermott Center for Human Growth and Development (Human Genetics Center).

In 2005, Popular Science published an article featuring Garner's holographic video-projection system.

== Virginia Tech ==
In December 2009, Garner moved to Virginia Tech and became the executive director of the Virginia Bioinformatics Institute and a professor of biological science, computer science and medicine.

In 2012, Garner was demoted from executive director following an audit into his hiring and firing practices. Garner then sued the university in 2014, claiming that the university violated his constitutional 14th amendment due process rights and his employment contract, and it caused damage to his reputation. In a 2015 settlement, he was appointed executive director of the newly created Office of Medical Informatics Translation, Training and Ethics (MITTE) for four years without limits on outside employment. The settlement, which resolves both federal and state cases, also stipulates that Garner will not be eligible for reappointments and will resign from his tenured professorship.

== Edward Via College of Osteopathic Medicine (VCOM) ==
In April 2016, Garner became a member of the Edward Via College of Osteopathic Medicine as a professor of biomedicine and executive director, Primary Care Research Network and the VCOM Center for Bioinformatics and Genetics.

In 2018, Garner became the associate vice-provost for research development for the Edward Via College of Osteopathic Medicine.

In 2019, Garner was also appointed as the interim associate dean for biomedical affairs for the Carolinas Campus of the Edward Via College of Osteopathic Medicine.

== Achievements ==
Garner sits on numerous corporate advisory boards and advises for numerous governmental agencies. He is also the founder of several companies – Helix, BioAutomation, Light Biology (acquired by Nimblegen, acquired by Roche), Orbit Genomics (previously Genomeon), Heliotext, Quanta Lingua and Comperity.
