= Ingelfinger rule =

The Ingelfinger rule is an eponymous rule named after Franz J. Ingelfinger, The New England Journal of Medicine (NEJM) editor-in-chief who enunciated it in 1969. The rule, as originally articulated in the editorial "Definition of 'Sole Contribution'", stated that NEJM would not publish findings that had been published elsewhere. Though originally meant only for NEJM, the guideline was subsequently adopted by several other scientific journals, and it has shaped scientific publishing ever since. Historically it has also helped to ensure that the journal's content is fresh and does not duplicate content previously reported elsewhere, and it seeks to protect the scientific embargo system.

A similar policy had been earlier expressed in 1960 by Samuel Goudsmit, editor of the Physical Review Letters, but it did not become as well known.

The Ingelfinger rule has been seen as having the aim of preventing authors from performing duplicate publications which would unduly inflate their publication record. On the other hand, it has also been stated that the real reason for the Ingelfinger rule is to protect the journals' revenue stream, and with the increase in popularity of preprint servers such as arXiv, bioRxiv, and HAL many journals have loosened their requirements concerning the Ingelfinger rule. In a defense of the policy, the journal said in an editorial that the practice discouraged scientists from talking to the media before their work was peer reviewed.

== See also ==
- List of academic journals by preprint policy
- News embargo
- Network effect
