= Experimental Lung Research =

- Discipline: Pulmonology
- Language: English
- Edited by: Mark Giembycz

Publication details
- History: 1980–present
- Publisher: Informa Healthcare
- Frequency: 10/year
- Impact factor: 1.069 (2010)

Standard abbreviations
- ISO 4: Exp. Lung Res.

Indexing
- CODEN: EXLRDA
- ISSN: 0190-2148 (print); 1521-0499 (web)
- LCCN: 80645217
- OCLC no.: 04692740

Links
- Journal homepage; Online access; Online archive

Experimental Lung Research is a peer-reviewed medical journal that publishes original articles in all fields of respiratory tract anatomy, biology, developmental biology, toxicology, and pathology. The editor-in-chief is Mark Giembycz (Department of Pharmacology and Therapeutics, University of Calgary). According to the Journal Citation Reports, the journal has a 2010 impact factor of 1.069, ranking it 38th out of 46 journals in the category "Respiratory System".
