= Boston University School of Dental Medicine =

Dental school of Boston University

Coordinates: 42.33636°N 71.07039°W

Boston University Henry M. Goldman School of Dental Medicine
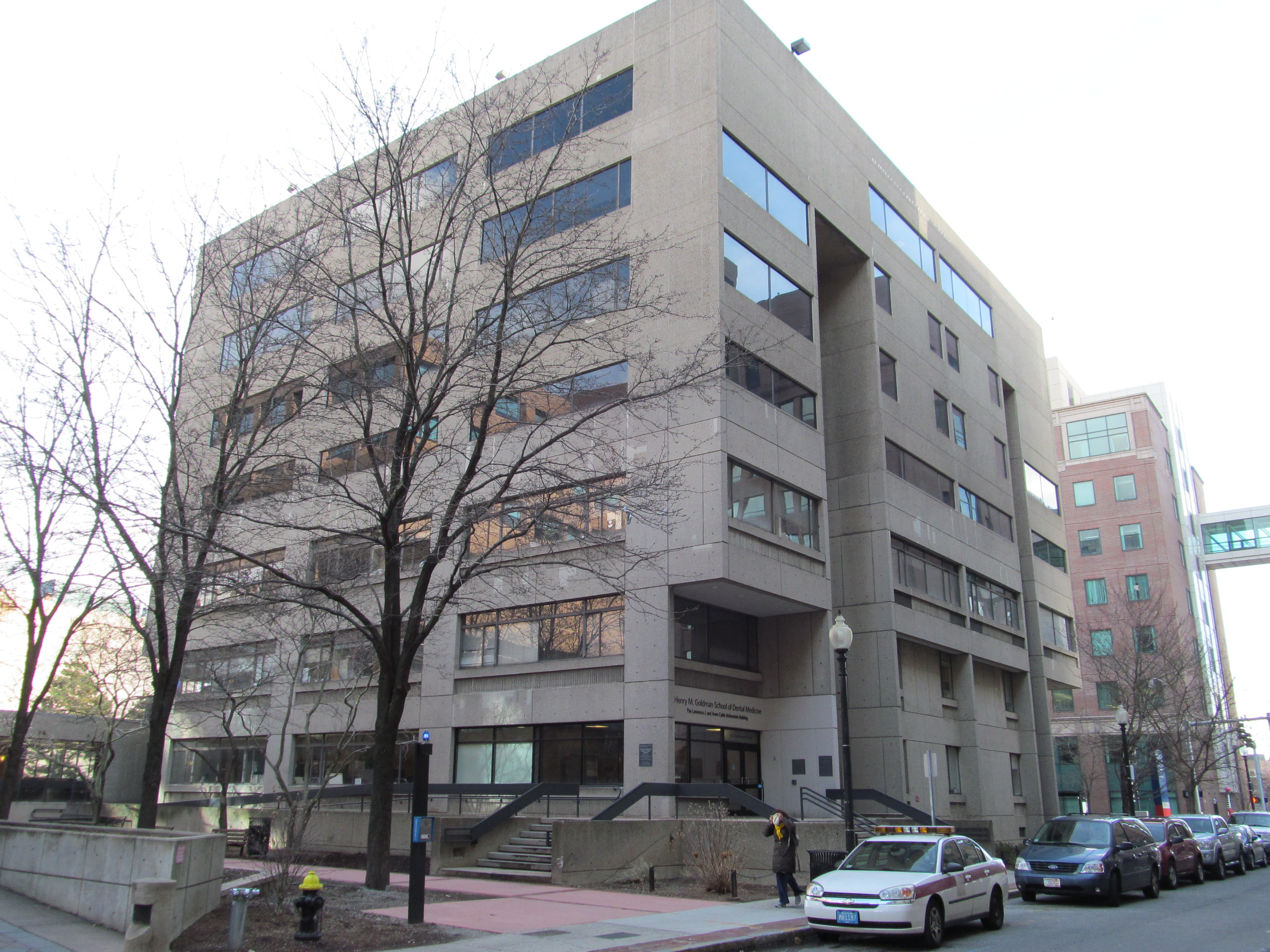
- Goldman School of Dental Medicine
- Type: Private
- Established: 1958, Founded 1963
- Provost: Karen H. Antman
- Dean: Cataldo Leone
- Faculty: 250
- Administrative staff: 325
- Students: 767
- Location: Boston, Massachusetts, United States
- Campus: Urban
- Website: bu.edu/dental

The Boston University Henry M. Goldman School of Dental Medicine (BU Dental) is the dental school of Boston University. Its curriculum is based on the Applied Professional Experience (APEX) Program, which gives students practical experience at a dental practice as part of clinical training. The School has about 800 students in predoctoral and postdoctoral programs.

The School can trace its origins to 1958 when the Boston University School of Medicine started a Department of Stomatology to provide postdoctoral education in dentistry. At that time, the institution was the only one in the country devoted solely to specialty education in dentistry. In 1963, it became Boston University School of Graduate Dentistry under the leadership of Dean Henry M. Goldman. In 1970, the School moved to 100 East Newton Street. In 1972, the School included a predoctoral program leading to a DMD degree. In September 2021, the School completed a three-year expansion/renovation project at an approximate $115 million cost.

In 1996, the School was renamed the "Boston University Henry M. Goldman School of Dental Medicine"

In November 2021, Dr. Cataldo Leone was named Dean.

== Departments ==
=== Dental School ===
- General Dentistry
- Digital Dentistry training
  - Dental students get experience with dental training robots that allow them to simulate techniques and procedures they will eventually perform on patients when they graduate and practice dentistry.
- Endodontics
- Health Policy & Health Services Research
- Molecular & Cell Biology
- Oral & Maxillofacial Pathology
- Oral & Maxillofacial Surgery
- Orthodontics & Dentofacial Orthopedics
- Pediatric Dentistry
- Periodontology & Oral Biology
- Restorative Sciences/Biomaterials

=== Pre-Doctoral ===
- DMD
- Advanced Standing DMD (for international students who have a dental degree from a country other than the United States or Canada)

=== Post-Doctoral ===
- Advanced Education in General Dentistry
- Dental Public Health
- Endodontics
- Implantology
- Operative Dentistry
- Oral & Maxillofacial Pathology
- Oral & Maxillofacial Surgery
- Oral Biology
- Orthodontics & Dentofacial Orthopedics
- Pediatric Dentistry
- Periodontology
- Prosthodontics

== See also ==
- American Student Dental Association
