= The New England Journal of Medicine =

Peer-reviewed medical journal

- Discipline: Medicine
- Language: English
- Edited by: Eric Rubin

Publication details
- Former names: The New England Journal of Medicine and Surgery; The New England Medical Review and Journal; The Boston Medical and Surgical Journal
- History: 1812–present
- Publisher: Massachusetts Medical Society (United States)
- Frequency: weekly
- Open access: Delayed (6 months)
- Impact factor: 78.5 (2024)

Standard abbreviations
- Bluebook: New Eng. J. Med.
- ISO 4: N. Engl. J. Med.

Indexing
- CODEN: NEJMAG
- ISSN: 0028-4793 (print); 1533-4406 (web)
- LCCN: 20020456
- OCLC no.: 231027780

Links
- Journal homepage; Online access; Online archive

The New England Journal of Medicine (NEJM) is a weekly medical journal published by the Massachusetts Medical Society. Founded in 1812, the journal is among the most prestigious peer-reviewed medical journals. Its 2024 impact factor was 78.5, ranking it 2nd out of 168 journals in the category "Medicine, General & Internal".

== History ==
In September 1811, Boston physician John Collins Warren, along with James Jackson, submitted a formal prospectus to establish the New England Journal of Medicine and Surgery and Collateral Branches of Science as a medical and philosophical journal. Subsequently, the first issue of the New England Journal of Medicine and Surgery and the Collateral Branches of Medical Science was published in January 1812. The journal was published quarterly.

In 1823, another publication, the Boston Medical Intelligencer, appeared under the editorship of Jerome V. C. Smith.

In 1828, the editors of the New England Journal of Medicine and Surgery and the Collateral Branches of Medical Science purchased the weekly Intelligencer for $600, merging the two publications to form the Boston Medical and Surgical Journal, and shifting from quarterly to weekly publication.

In 1921, the Massachusetts Medical Society purchased the Journal for US$1 and, the publication was renamed to The New England Journal of Medicine in 1928.

Evolution of the Journal
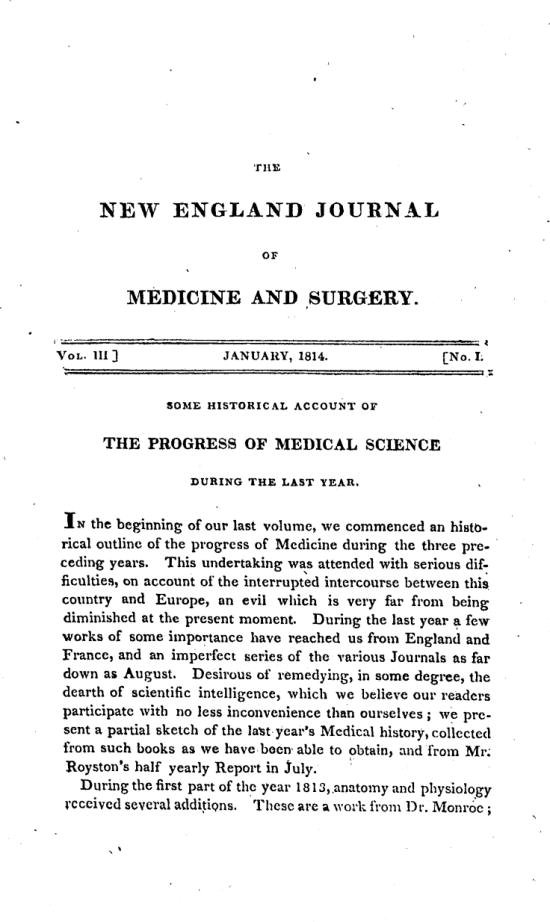
January 1814 edition of the Journal

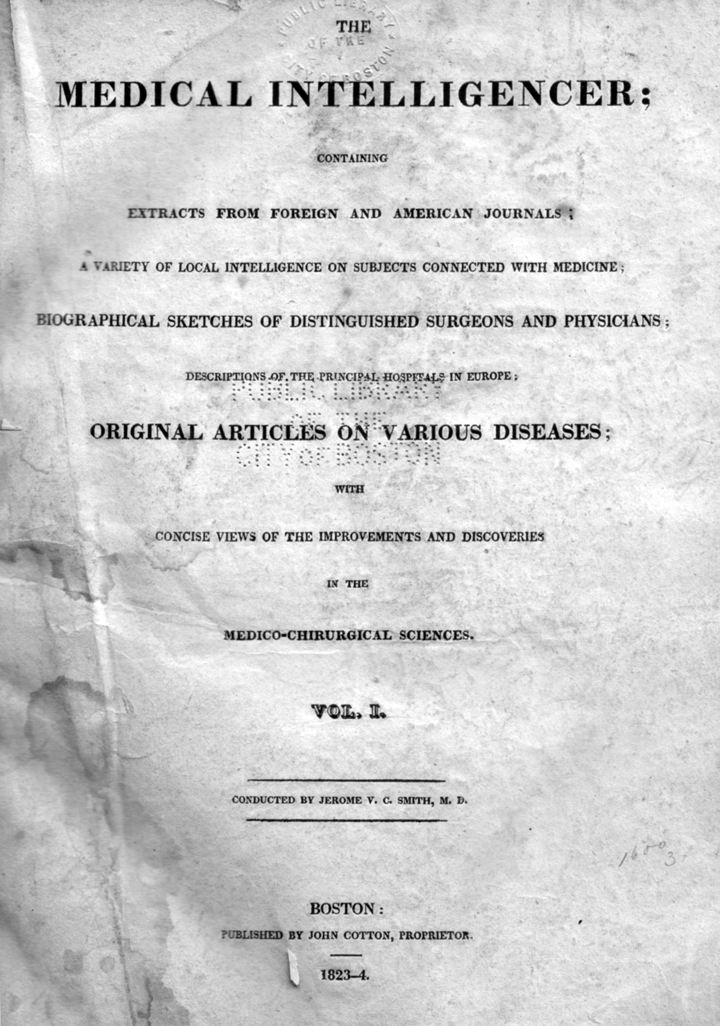
1823 Boston Medical Intelligencer

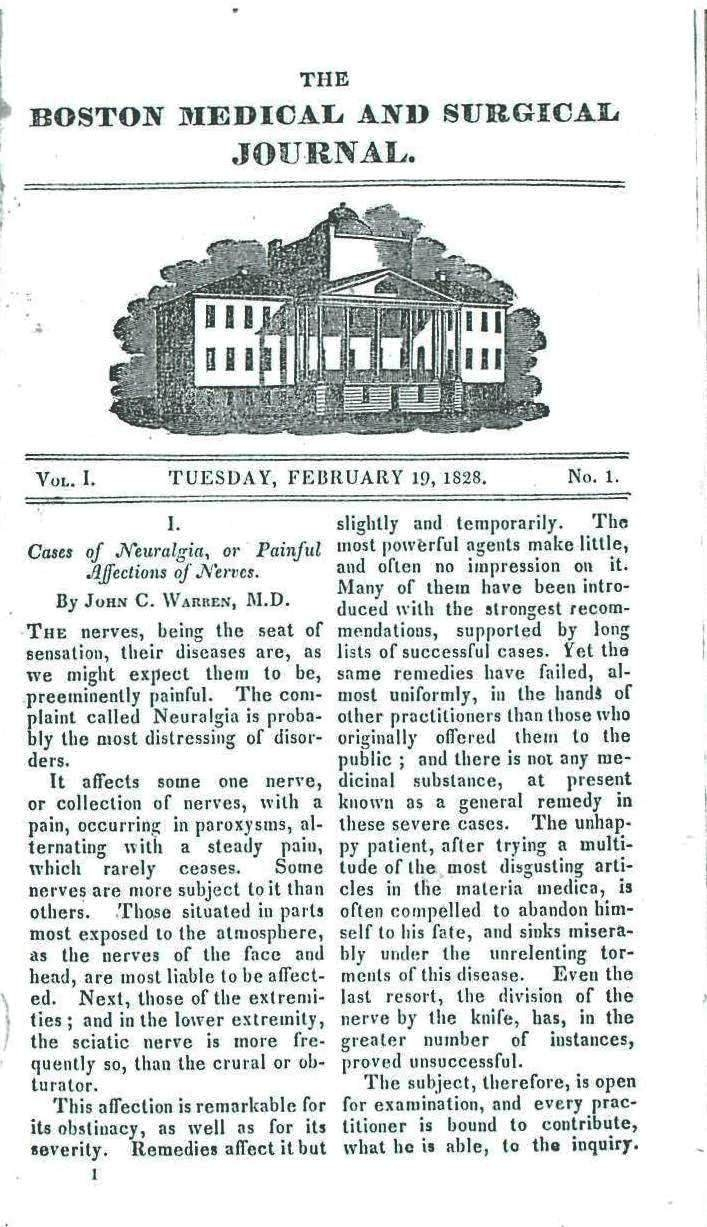
1828 Boston Medical and Surgical Journal

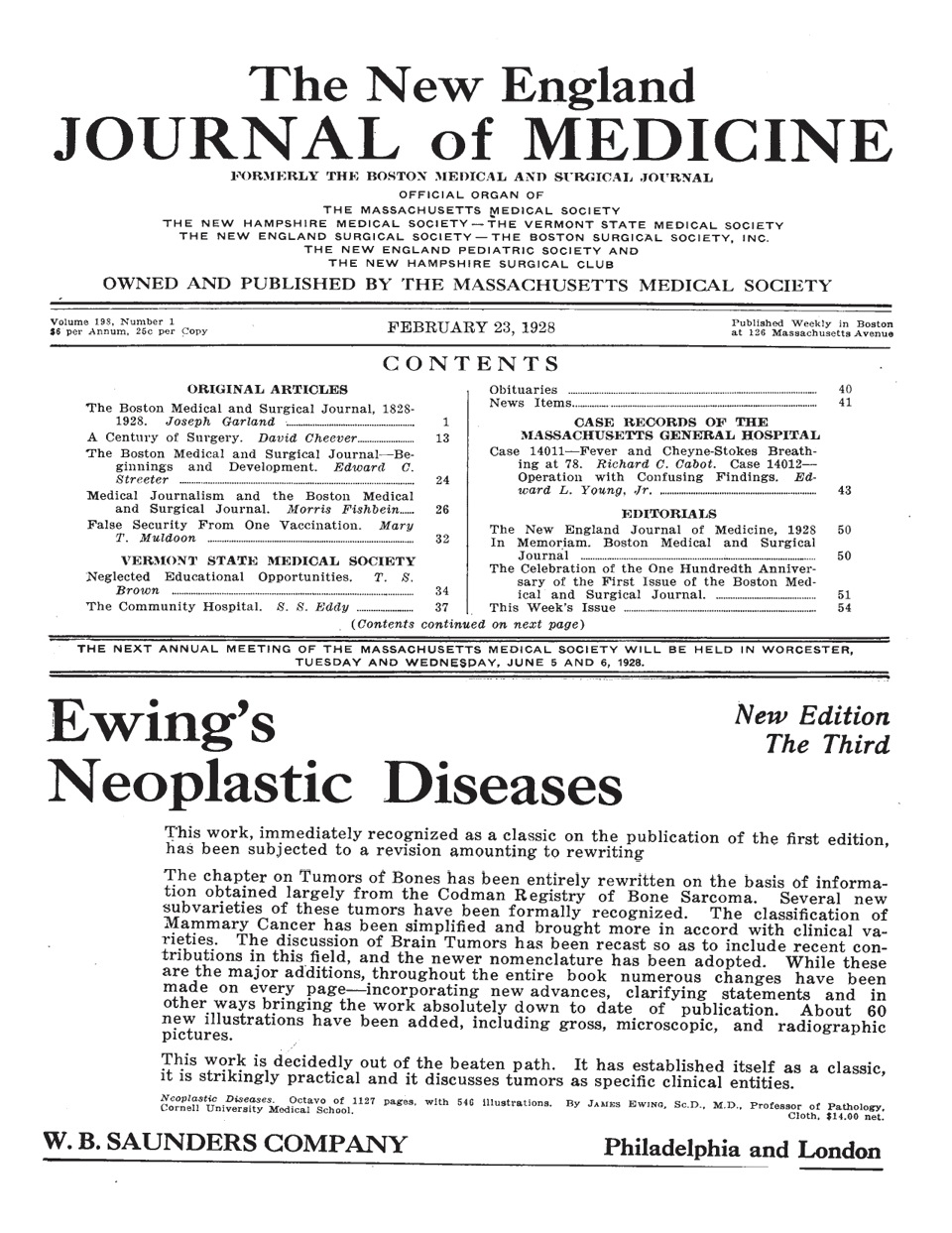
February 23, 1928, cover of The New England Journal of Medicine. First use of present name.

== Logo ==
The journal's logo depicts the snake-wrapped Rod of Asclepius crossed over a quill pen. The dates on the logo represent the founding of the components of The New England Journal of Medicine: 1812 for the New England Journal of Medicine and Surgery and Collateral Branches of Medical Science, 1823 for the Boston Medical Intelligencer, 1828 for the Boston Medical and Surgical Journal, and 1928 for the New England Journal of Medicine.

== Notable articles ==
Notable articles from the course of The New England Journal of Medicine's history include:

- In November 1846, the New England Journal of Medicine published a report by Henry Jacob Bigelow on the first public demonstration of a generalized anesthetic. The agent was inhaled ether, the first modern anesthetic. This allowed patients to remain sedated during operations ranging from dental extraction to amputation. "A patient has been rendered completely insensible during an amputation of the thigh, regain consciousness after a short interval," Bigelow wrote. "Other severe operations have been performed without the knowledge of the patients."
- In June 1906, James Homer Wright published an article that described how he stained and studied bone marrow with descriptions of what are now known as megakaryocytes and platelets.
- In October 1872, a lecture by Charles-Édouard Brown-Séquard was published that proposed the then-revolutionary idea that one cerebral hemisphere can influence both sides of the body. The neurologist would go on to describe what is now known as the Brown-Séquard syndrome.
- In June 1948, Sidney Farber reported promising results in treatment of early childhood leukemia. Based on anecdotal evidence that children with acute leukemia worsened if they were given folic acid, he worked on blocking folic acid metabolism. His team gave 16 infants and children with acute lymphoblastic leukemia a folic acid inhibitor, aminopterin—10 showed improvement by clinical and hematologic parameters after three months. In his article, Farber advised receiving the results cautiously: "It is again emphasized that these remissions are temporary in character and that the substance is toxic and may be productive of even greater disturbances than have been encountered so far in our studies," he wrote. "No evidence has been mentioned in this report that would justify the suggestion of the term 'cure' of acute leukemia in children."
- In November 1952, cardiologist Paul Zoll published an early report on resuscitation of the heart. "The purpose of this report is to describe the successful use in 2 patients of a quick, simple, effective and safe method of arousing the heart from ventricular standstill by an artificial, external, electric pacemaker", he wrote. "For the first time it was possible to keep a patient alive during ventricular asystole lasting for hours to days. This procedure may prove valuable in many clinical situations."
- In February 1973, NEJM published the first report of polyp removal using a colonoscope and introduced a procedure during screening to reduce cancer risk. The authors reported on 218 patients, from whom they removed 303 polyps (at one or more procedures per patient).
- A letter published in the NEJM in 1980 was later described by the journal as having been "heavily and uncritically cited" to claim that addiction due to use of opioids was rare, and its publication in such an authoritative journal was used by pharmaceutical companies to push widespread use of opioid drugs, leading to an addiction crisis in the U.S. and other countries.
- In December 1981, two landmark articles described the clinical course of four patients—first reported in the CDC's June 1981 Morbidity and Mortality Weekly Report—with the disease that would come to be known as AIDS.
- In April 2001, Brian Druker et al. reported a targeted therapy for chronic myelogenous leukemia. Based on the knowledge that BCR-ABL, a constitutively activated tyrosine kinase, causes CML, the authors tested with success an inhibitor of this tyrosine kinase in patients who had failed first-line therapy. The finding helped begin the era of designing cancer drugs to target specific molecular abnormalities.
- In October 2020, the journal published an editorial, signed by all 34 editors, in which they condemned the Trump administration's handling of the COVID-19 pandemic saying that "they are dangerously incompetent" and that "they have taken a crisis and turned it into a tragedy." This is the first time NEJM has ever supported or condemned a political candidate and only three other times in history has an editorial been signed by all the editors.
- In April 2021, Robin Carhart-Harris et al. demonstrated that in the pharmacological treatment of major depressive disorder, there was no significant difference in antidepressant effects between the psychedelic drug psilocybin and the SSRI escitalopram after six weeks. Significant doses of psilocybin were only administered twice in the six-week period, while escitalopram was taken daily. This was the first time psychedelics and SSRIs were compared in the treatment of depression.

== Social media ==
On April 25, 1996, the NEJM announced a new web site, which published each week the abstracts for research articles and the full text of editorials, cases, and letters to the editor. After print publishing for 184 years this was the NEJM's first use of the Internet for electronic publication.

The site was launched several months earlier in 1996, but the editors wanted proof that weekly electronic publication would work. Only then was an announcement approved for publication on the editorial page. In 1997, the website included prepublication releases of certain articles prior to their print publication. In 1998, online publication extended to include the full text of all its articles from 1993 forward.

Since its launch, NEJM has added to its site:

- Videos in Clinical Medicine, peer-reviewed educational videos to teach procedures requiring skilled techniques and specialized physical examination.
- Interactive Medical Cases, which mimic a clinical encounter by presenting the patient's history with results of the physical examination and laboratory and radiographic tests. Multiple-choice questions throughout test the taker's knowledge.
- NEJM Archive, the entire collection of the journal's published material.

== Influence ==
The George Polk Awards site noted that its 1977 award to The New England Journal of Medicine: "...provided the first significant mainstream visibility for a publication that would achieve enormous attention and prestige in the ensuing decades."

The journal usually has the highest impact factor of the journals of internal medicine. According to the Journal Citation Reports, NEJM had a 2017 impact factor of 79.258, ranking it first of 153 journals in the category "General & Internal Medicine". It was the only journal in the category with an impact factor of more than 70. By comparison, the second and third ranked journals in the category (The Lancet and JAMA) had impact factors of 53.254 and 47.661 respectively.

Theodore Dalrymple feels that this influence is unwarranted. In False Positive: A Year of Error, Omission, and Political Correctness in the New England Journal of Medicine, he examines various articles on medical and social issues that the NEJM published over the course of a year. He found that many arrived at conclusions which were not supported by the evidence presented, or ignored easily available evidence that contradicted their conclusions.

== Specialty journals ==
In 2022, NEJM set up a new sub-journal, NEJM Evidence. NEJM Evidence is a monthly digital journal featuring original research. It focuses on clinical trials and decision making.

NEJM Evidence
- Discipline: Medicine
- Language: English
- Edited by: Jeffrey M. Drazen

Publication details
- History: 2022–present
- Publisher: NEJM Group (United States)
- Frequency: monthly

Standard abbreviations
- ISO 4: NEJM Evid.

Links
- Journal homepage

== Ingelfinger rule ==
The New England Journal of Medicine requires that articles it publishes have not been published or released elsewhere. Referred to as the Ingelfinger rule, the policy is intended to protect newsworthiness, and to subject research to peer review "before it is touted to the public or the profession". By 1991, four types of exceptions were recognized, including when "prepublication release of research conclusions is warranted because of immediate implications for the public health".

The rule was first described in a 1969 editorial, "Definition of Sole Contribution", by Franz Ingelfinger, the editor-in-chief at that time. A number of medical journals have similar rules in place.

== Vioxx correction controversy ==
In the early 2000s, The New England Journal of Medicine was involved in a controversy around problems with research on the drug Vioxx. A study was published in the journal in November 2000 which noted an increase in myocardial infarction amongst those taking Vioxx. According to Richard Smith, the former editor of the British Medical Journal, concerns about the correctness of that study were raised with the journal's editor, Jeff Drazen, as early as August 2001. That year, both the US Food and Drug Administration and the Journal of the American Medical Association also cast doubt on the validity of the data interpretation that had been published in the NEJM.

Merck withdrew the drug from market in September 2004. In December 2005, NEJM published an expression of concern about the original study following discovery that the authors knew more about certain adverse events than they disclosed at the time of publication. From the Expression of Concern: "Until the end of November 2005, we believed that these were late events that were not known to the authors in time to be included in the article published in the Journal on November 23, 2000. It now appears, however, from a memorandum dated July 5, 2000, that was obtained by subpoena in the Vioxx litigation and made available to the Journal, that at least two of the authors knew about the three additional myocardial infarctions at least two weeks before the authors submitted the first of two revisions and 4 1/2 months before publication of the article." Physician John Abramson has noted that those authors' financial ties to Merck violated NEJM's conflict of interest policy, which the journal failed to enforce.

During the five-year period between publication and Expression of Concern, it has been estimated that Merck paid NEJM as much as US$836,000 for article reprints that Merck used for promotional purposes. The journal was publicly rebuked for its response to the research issues in editorials appearing in publications including the British Medical Journal and the Journal of the Royal Society of Medicine.

== Open access policy ==
NEJM makes articles that meet the criteria for global and public health importance freely available to all readers upon publication at NEJM.org. NEJM also partners with Research4Life in their Access to Research in Health (Hinari) program to grant to low-income countries immediate free access to NEJM.org.

NEJM does not charge authors any submission or publication fees. NEJM also works with authors whose articles report research supported by funding bodies with open access mandates, including (but not limited to) Plan S funders and the U.S. government, including NIH, to ensure that authors are able to meet their funders' requirements for public access to research results.

For research articles submitted before February 1, 2024, NEJM makes the full-text Version of Record available at NEJM.org six months after publication. For research articles submitted on or after February 1, 2024, NEJM will provide authors with a PDF file of the Author Accepted Manuscript that may be deposited in a noncommercial repository after publication.

NEJM also has two podcast features, one with interviews of doctors and researchers that are publishing in the journal, and another summarizing the content of each issue. Other offerings include Continuing Medical Education, Videos in Clinical Medicine (showing videos of medical procedures), and the weekly Image Challenge.

== Editors ==
- George B. Shattuck, 1881–1912
- Walter Prentice Bowers, 1921–1937
- Robert Nason Nye, 1937–1947
- Joseph Garland, 1947–1967
- Franz J. Ingelfinger, 1967–1977
- Arnold S. Relman, 1977–1991
- Jerome P. Kassirer, 1991–1999
- Marcia Angell, 1999–2000
- Jeffrey M. Drazen, 2000–2019
- Eric Rubin, 2019–present

== See also ==
- List of medical journals

== Bibliography ==
- Conaboy, Chelsea (June 17, 2012). "You've come a long way, doc". The Boston Globe Magazine (milestones of the NEJM).
- Müller, Daniel C.; Duff, Ellen M.C.; Stern, Kathy L. (2012). "Timeline: 200 years of the New England Journal of Medicine". The New England Journal of Medicine. 366 (1): e3. doi:10.1056/NEJMp1114819. PMID 22216863.
