= Boston University School of Medicine =

Private medical school in Boston, Massachusetts, US

Boston University Chobanian and Avedisian School of Medicine
- Type: Private medical school
- Established: 1848; 178 years ago
- Parent institution: Boston University
- Dean: Karen H. Antman
- Faculty: 2,052
- Students: 1,712
- Location: Boston, Massachusetts, U.S. 42.3356°N 71.0716°W
- Campus: Urban
- Tuition: $58,976 (2018–2019)
- Website: bumc.bu.edu/busm

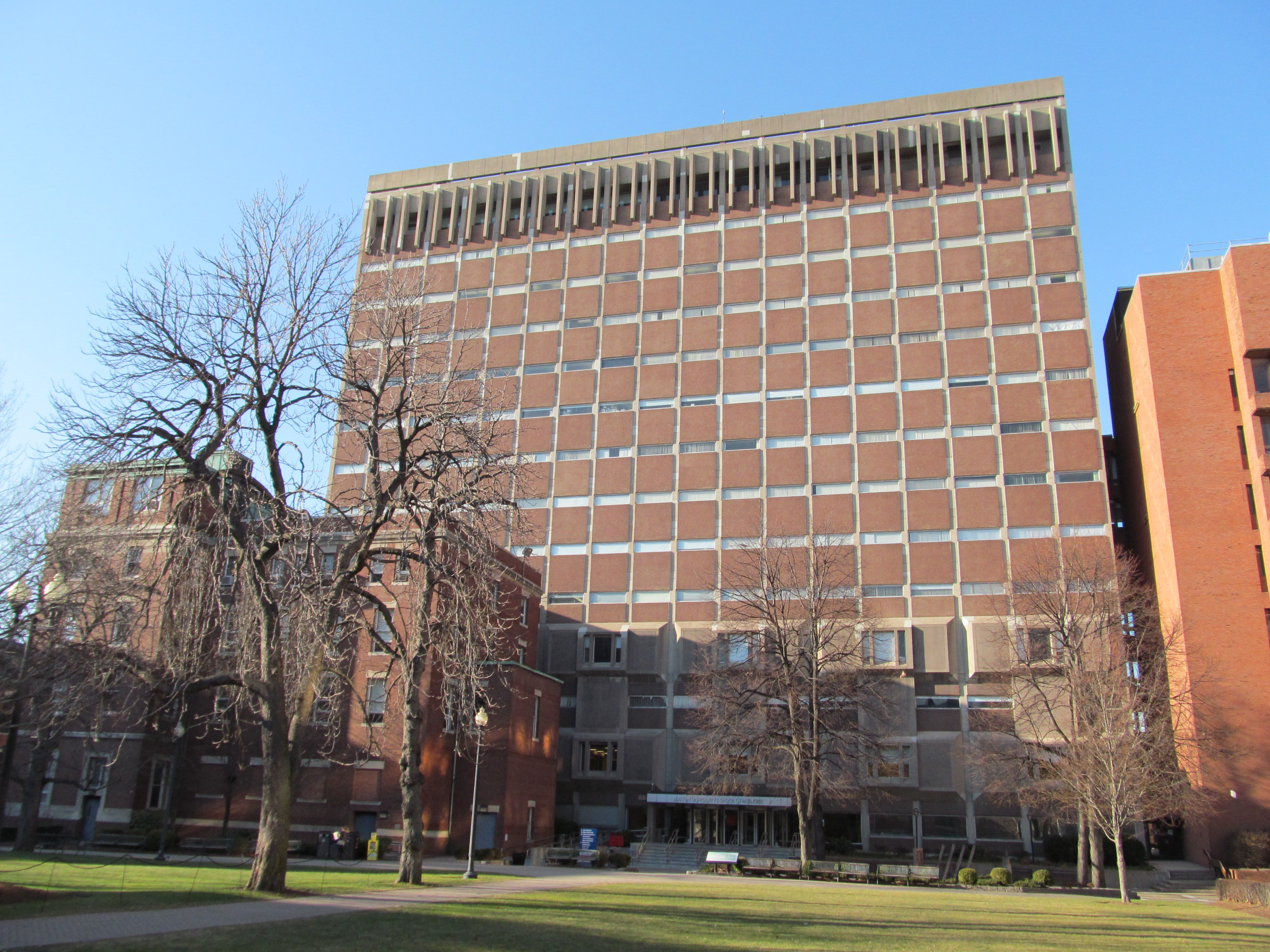
Instructional building

The Boston University School of Medicine (formally the Chobanian and Avedisian School of Medicine) is the medical school of Boston University, a private research university in Boston, Massachusetts. It was founded in 1848. Originally known as the New England Female Medical College, it was renamed Boston University School of Medicine in 1873. It became the Boston University Aram V. Chobanian & Edward Avedisian School of Medicine, in 2022. In 1864, it became the first medical school in the United States to award an MD degree to an African-American woman.

The school is the only medical school located in the South End neighborhood of Boston, Massachusetts. Boston Medical Center, its primary teaching hospital, operates the largest 24-hour Level I trauma center in New England, and the largest network of regional community health centers. The school is the home of the Framingham Heart Study, from which all knowledge of cardiovascular disease risk factors were originally discovered.

== History ==
The New England Female Medical College was the first institution to medically train women, founded in 1848. The institution was reformed and renamed in 1873 when Boston University merged with the New England Female Medical College and began to admit men as well as women. Following a $100 million donation in 2022 by philanthropist and clarinetist Edward Avedisian, the school name was formally changed once again to "Boston University Aram V. Chobanian & Edward Avedisian School of Medicine", honoring Avedisian and his friend, former dean of the medical school Aram V. Chobanian.

== Recent class profile ==
In the autumn of 2019, Boston University School of Medicine's first-year medical students were 48% female, and 14% were of an ethnicity that is under-represented in medicine. Out of matriculated students, 124 are in the traditional 4-year Doctor of Medicine (MD) program. Average GPA was 3.69. Six students were enrolled in the MD-PhD program, and the rest were in some other type of non-traditional MD track. The school also offers joint degrees with other Boston University graduate schools, allowing the medical students to earn an MD degree with a Master of Business Administration (MBA), Master of Public Health (MPH), or PhD.

Students matriculating came from 29 states and 19 countries. Average MCAT was 517. Students' ages ranged from 18 to 35.

== Graduate medical sciences ==
The school offers MA, MS, and PhD degrees through Graduate Medical Sciences. The MA degree is in Mental Health Counseling and Behavioral Medicine. An MS degree is available in Anatomy and Neurobiology - Vesalius Program, Bioimaging, Biomedical Forensics, Biomedical Research Technologies, Clinical Research, Forensic Anthropology, Genetic Counseling. Health Professions Education, Healthcare Emergency Management, Medical Anthropology & Cross Cultural Practice, Medical Sciences, Nutrition and Metabolism, Oral Health Sciences, Pathology Laboratory Sciences, Physician Assistant, and Physiology and Biophysics.

PhD and MD-PhD degrees are also granted in the following areas:

- Anatomy and Neurobiology
- Behavioral Neuroscience
- Biochemistry
- Biomedical Neuroscience
- Biophysics
- Cell and Molecular Biology
- Genetics and Genomics
- Immunology
- Medical Nutrition Sciences
- Microbiology
- Molecular Medicine
- Oral Biology
- Pathology and Laboratory Medicine
- Pharmacology
- Physiology

== People ==
=== Notable faculty ===
There are 1,159 faculty members at BU's School of Medicine: 946 full-time and 213 part-time. Notable faculty include:

- Andrew E. Budson (2005-present), Professor of Neurology
- Alfred I. Tauber (1982–present), recipient of the 2008 Science Medal awarded by the University of Bologna
- Isaac Asimov (1949-1979), Professor of Biochemistry and prominent science fiction writer
- Karen H. Antman (2005–present), professor of medicine, Provost and Dean
- Osamu Shimomura (1982–present), 2008 laureate of the Nobel Prize in Chemistry

=== Notable alumni ===
- Drew Weissman (M.D., Ph.D. '87), 2023 laureate of the Nobel Prize in Physiology or Medicine
- Marcia Angell (MD'67), Former editor of the New England Journal of Medicine
- Steven L. Berk, physician, professor at Texas Tech University Health Sciences Center
- Jennifer Berman, sexual health expert, urologist, and female sexual medicine specialist
- Ida Joe Brooks (MD 1891), among Arkansas's earliest women physicians and the first female faculty member at the University of Arkansas Medical School
- Rebecca Lee Crumpler (MD1864), the first African-American to receive an M.D. in the United States and a graduate of the New England Female Medical College (1848–1873), which merged with Boston University in 1873
- Franklin Ware Mann (MD1880) – pioneering ballistics researcher and inventor of the Mann rest adopted by the National Institute of Standards and Technology and Aberdeen Proving Ground
- Fe Del Mundo (MS'40), National Scientist of the Philippines
- Ralph David Feigin (MD'62), Current Physician-in-Chief of the Texas Children's Hospital
- I Michael Leitman (MD'85) American surgeon and Dean for Graduate Medical Education, Icahn School of Medicine at Mount Sinai
- Edward Ross Ritvo (MD'55), autism researcher, Neuropsychiatric Institute, David Geffen School of Medicine at UCLA
- Louis Wade Sullivan (MD'58), President of the Morehouse School of Medicine and former U.S. Secretary of Health and Human Services
- William Lane Watkins (MD1876), first male black graduate
- Louis Weinstein (MD'43), microbiologist and infectious disease physician
- Lawrence Yannuzzi (MD'64), angiography pioneer

== Clinical affiliates ==
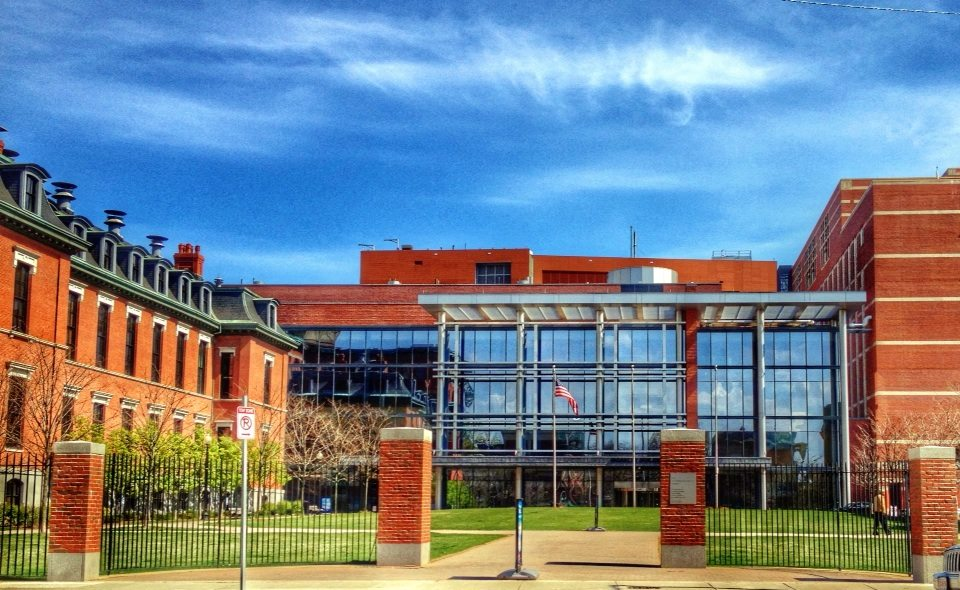
Boston Medical Center

- Boston Medical Center — Boston, MA
- Boston Veterans Administration Medical Center - Various
- Central Maine Medical Center — Lewiston, ME
- Edith Nourse Rogers Memorial Veterans Hospital — Bedford, MA
- Norwood Hospital — Norwood, MA
- St. Elizabeth's Medical Center - Boston, MA
- Boston Children's Hospital (joint residency program with Harvard Medical School) - Boston, MA

== In popular culture ==
Boston University School of Medicine and the Boston Medical Center serve as the setting for Robin Cook's bestselling novel Coma as well as the film of the same name directed by Michael Crichton.

== See also ==
- Boston Medical Center
- Goldman School of Dental Medicine
- Boston University School of Public Health
- Boston University Medical Campus
