= List of healthcare reform advocacy groups in the United States =

Healthcare reform advocacy groups in the United States are non-profit organizations in the US who have as one of their primary goals healthcare reform in the United States.

These notable organizations address issues such as universal healthcare, national health insurance, and single-payer healthcare.

== Advocacy groups ==
- American Medical Student Association
- American Nurses Association
- California Nurses Association/National Nurses Organizing Committee
- Campaign for Better Health Care
- Doctors For America
- Families USA
- Health Care for America NOW!
- Healthcare-NOW!
- Medicare Rights Center
- National Coalition on Health Care
- National Physicians Alliance (merged into Doctors for America, 2019)
- Pennsylvania Medical Society
- Physicians for a National Health Program
- Universal Health Care Foundation of Connecticut
- We Can Do Better (formerly Archimedes Movement)
- Whole Washington

== Campaigns within larger groups ==
- AARP
- Democracy for America
- Democratic Socialists of America
- MoveOn.org
- National Conference of State Legislatures
- Progressive Democrats of America

== Policy institutes ==
- Brookings Institution
- Cato Institute
- Commonwealth Fund
- Robert Wood Johnson Foundation
- Kaiser Family Foundation

== See also ==
- Healthcare in the United States
- Medicare (United States)
- Medicare for All Act
