= Health care reform =

Governmental policy

Health care reform is for the most part governmental policy that affects health care delivery in a given place. Health care reform typically attempts to:

- Broaden the population that receives health care coverage through either public sector insurance programs or private sector insurance companies
- Expand the array of health care providers consumers may choose among
- Improve the access to health care specialists
- Improve the quality of health care
- Give more care to citizens
- Decrease the cost of health care

== Frameworks for health care reform ==
While final performance goals are largely agreed upon, different frameworks suggest different intermediate goals, such as equity, productivity, safety, innovation, and choice.

| Framework | Intermediate Goals |
|---|---|
| Control knobs framework | Efficiency, Access, Quality |
| Framework for assessing behavioural healthcare | Effectiveness, Efficiency, Equity |
| EGIPSS model | Productivity, Volume of care and services, Quality of care and services |
| WHO Performance framework | Access, Coverage, Quality, Safety |
| Commonwealth Fund framework | High-quality care, Efficient care, Access, System and workforce innovation and improvement |
| WHO Building Blocks Framework | Access, Coverage, Quality, Safety |
| Systems Thinking | Equity, Choice, Efficiency, Effectiveness |

=== Control knobs theory ===
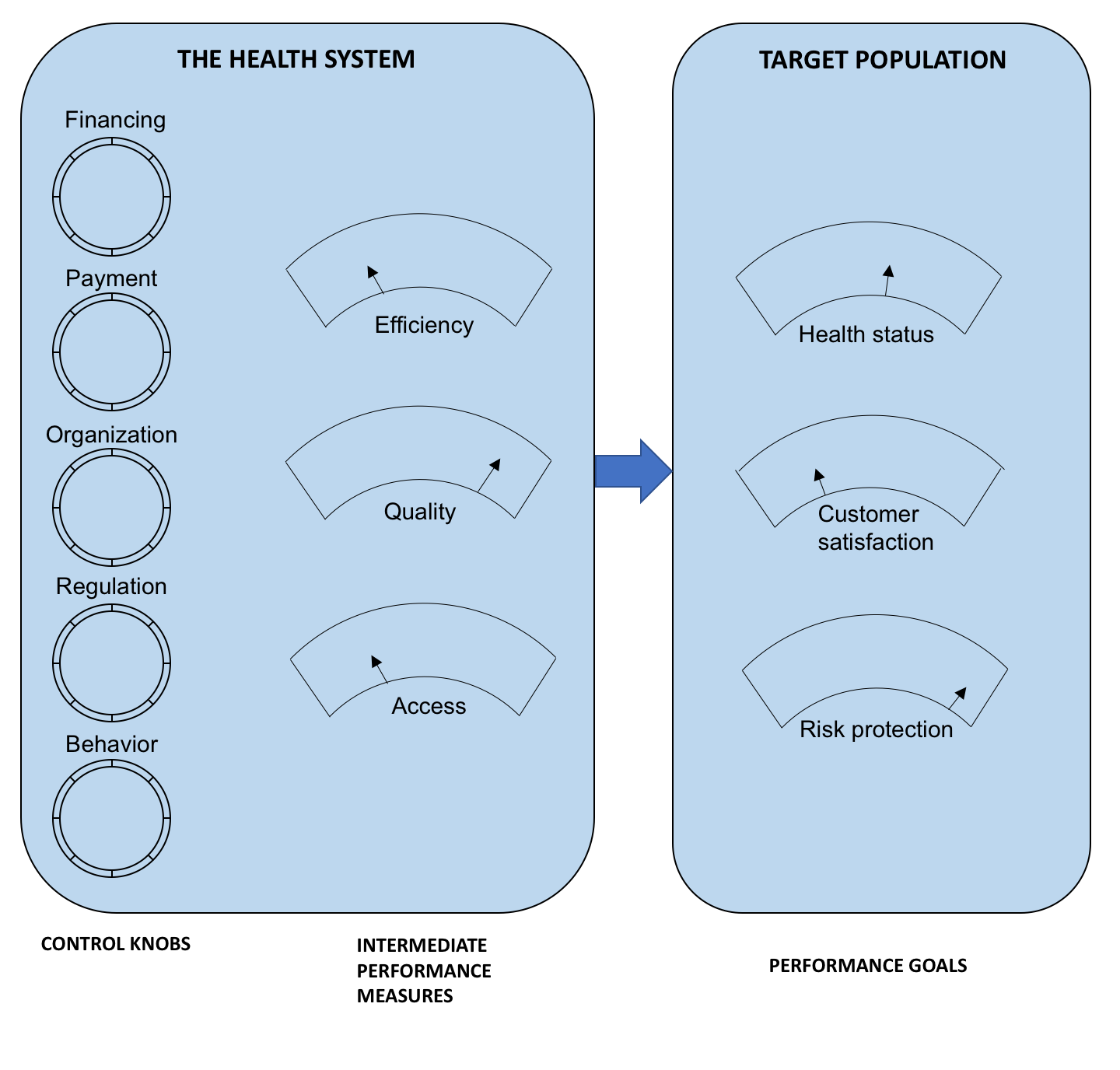
The five control knobs for health-sector reform

In "Getting Health Reform Right: A Guide to Improving Performance and Equity," Marc Roberts, William Hsiao, Peter Berman, and Michael Reich of the Harvard T.H. Chan School of Public Health aim to provide decision-makers with tools and frameworks for health care system reform. They propose five "control knobs" of health reform: financing, payment, organization, regulation, and behavior. These control knobs refer to the "mechanisms and processes that reformers can adjust to improve system performance". The authors selected these control knobs as representative of the most important factors upon which a policymaker can act to determine health system outcomes.

Their method emphasizes the importance of "identifying goals explicitly, diagnosing causes of poor performance systematically, and devising reforms that will produce real changes in performance". The authors view health care systems as a means to an end. Accordingly, the authors advocate for three intrinsic performance goals of the health system that can be adjusted through the control knobs. These goals include:

1. Health status: This goal refers to the overall health of the target population, assessed by metrics such as life expectancy, disease burden, and/or the distribution of these across population subgroups.
2. Customer satisfaction: This goal is concerned with the degree of satisfaction that the health care system produces among the target population.
3. Financial risk protection: This goal refers to the health system's ability to protect the target population from the financial burden of poor health or disease.

The authors also propose three intermediate performance measures, which are useful in determining the performance of system goals, but are not final objectives. These include:

1. Efficiency:
  1. Technical efficiency: maximum output per unit cost
  2. Allocative efficiency: a given budget maximises health system user satisfaction or other defined goals
2. Access: effective availability by which patients receive care
3. Quality of care: consideration of both the average quality and distribution of quality

The five proposed control knobs represent the mechanisms and processes that policy-makers can use to design effective health care reforms. These control knobs are not only the most important elements of a healthcare system, but they also represent the aspect that can be deliberately adjusted by reforms to affect change. The five control knobs are:

1. Financing, which encompasses all the mechanisms and activities designed to raise money for the health system. With respect to mechanisms, the financing knob includes health-related taxes, insurance premiums and out-of-pocket expenses among others. Activities refers to the institutional organization that collects and distributes finance to participants in the health sector. In other words, financing is about the resources available to the healthcare system, who controls them and who receives them. The financing knob has clear implications for the health status of the population and particular groups in it, as well as the access to health care and protection from financial risk that these groups, and the population as a whole, have. The financing knob involves numerous potential financing mechanisms and processes that should be selected in accordance with a country's social values and politics.
2. Payment refers to the mechanisms and processes through which the health system or patients distribute payments to providers, including fees, capitation and budgets on the part of the government and fees paid by patients. Payment is about the distribution of available resources to the providers of health services. Health care reform can implement a variety of incentive schemes for both providers and patients in a way to optimize limited resources.
3. Organization of the health system refers to the structure of providers, their roles, activities and operations. Essentially, organization describes how the health care market is set up: who are the providers, who are the consumers, who are the competitors, and who runs them. Changes in the organization of a healthcare system happen at multiple levels at both the front-line and managerial level.
4. Regulation refers to actions at the state level that modify or alter the behavior of various actors within the health care system. The actors may include health care providers, medical associations, individual consumers, insurance agents, and more. Regulations are only effective when enforced, therefore laws that are "on the books" but are not implemented in practice have little effect on the system as a whole.
5. Behavior of healthcare actors includes actions of both providers (e.g., doctors' behavior) and patients (e.g., anti-smoking campaigns) and involves "changing individual behavior through population-based interventions". Healthcare reform with respect to behavior revolves around the behaviors that can be used to improve the outcomes and performance of the health care system. These behaviors include health-seeking behavior, professional/doctors' behavior, treatment compliance, and lifestyle and prevention behaviors.

==== Limitations ====
The five control knobs of health care reform are not designed to work in isolation; health care reform may require the adjustment of more than one knob or of multiple knobs simultaneously. Further, there is no agreed-upon order of turning control knobs to achieve specific reforms or outcomes. Health care reform varies by setting and reforms from one context may not necessarily apply in another. The knobs interact with cultural and structural factors that are not illustrated within this framework, but which have an important effect on health care reform in a given context. Rather than a prescriptive proposal of recommendations, the framework allows users to adapt their analysis and actions based on cultural context and relevance of interventions.

== Reduction of health care fraud ==
One key component to healthcare reform is the reduction of healthcare fraud and abuse. In the U.S. and the EU, it is estimated that as much as 10 percent of all healthcare transactions and expenditures may be fraudulent.

== Comparison between countries ==
As evidenced by the large variety of different healthcare systems seen across the world, there are several different pathways that a country could take when thinking about reform. In comparison to the UK, physicians in Germany have more bargaining power through professional organizations (i.e., Medical association); this ability to negotiate affects reform efforts. Germany makes use of sickness funds, which citizens are obliged to join but are able to opt out if they have a very high income (Belien 87). The Netherlands used a similar system but the financial threshold for opting out was lower (Belien 89). The Swiss, on the other hand use more of a privately based health insurance system where citizens are risk-rated by age and sex, among other factors (Belien 90).

== By country ==
=== United States ===
In the United States, the debate regarding health care reform includes questions of a right to health care, access, fairness, sustainability, quality and amounts spent by government. The mixed public-private health care system in the United States is the most expensive in the world, with health care costing more per person than in any other nation, and a greater portion of gross domestic product (GDP) is spent on it than in any other United Nations member state except for East Timor (Timor-Leste).

==== Hawaii and Massachusetts ====
Both Hawaii and Massachusetts have implemented some incremental reforms in health care, but neither state has complete coverage of its citizens. For example, data from the Kaiser Family Foundation shows that 5% of Massachusetts and 8% of Hawaii residents are uninsured. To date, The U.S. Uniform Law Commission, sponsored by the National Conference of Commissioners on Uniform State Laws has not submitted a uniform act or model legislation regarding health care insurance or health care reform.

=== United Kingdom ===
Healthcare was reformed in 1948 after the Second World War, broadly along the lines of the 1942 Beveridge Report, with the creation of the National Health Service or NHS. It was originally established as part of a wider reform of social services and funded by a system of National Insurance, though receipt of healthcare was never contingent upon making contributions towards the National Insurance Fund. Private health care was not abolished but had to compete with the NHS. About 15% of all spending on health in the UK is still privately funded but this includes the patient contributions towards NHS provided prescription drugs, so private sector healthcare in the UK is quite small. As part of a wider reform of social provision it was originally thought that the focus would be as much about the prevention of ill-health as it was about curing disease. The NHS for example would distribute baby formula milk fortified with vitamins and minerals in an effort to improve the health of children born in the post war years as well as other supplements such as cod liver oil and malt. Many of the common childhood diseases such as measles, mumps, and chicken pox were mostly eradicated with a national program of vaccinations.

The NHS has been through many reforms since 1974. The Conservative Thatcher administrations attempted to bring competition into the NHS by developing a supplier/buyer role between hospitals as suppliers and health authorities as buyers. This necessitated the detailed costing of activities, something which the NHS had never had to do in such detail, and some felt was unnecessary. The Labour Party generally opposed these changes, although after the party became New Labour, the Blair government retained elements of competition and even extended it, allowing private health care providers to bid for NHS work. Some treatment and diagnostic centres are now run by private enterprise and funded under contract. However, the extent of this privatisation of NHS work is still small, though remains controversial. The administration committed more money to the NHS raising it to almost the same level of funding as the European average and as a result, there was large expansion and modernisation programme and waiting times improved.

The government of Gordon Brown proposed new reforms for care in England. One is to take the NHS back more towards health prevention by tackling issues that are known to cause long term ill health. The biggest of these is obesity and related diseases such as diabetes and cardio-vascular disease. The second reform is to make the NHS a more personal service, and it is negotiating with doctors to provide more services at times more convenient to the patient, such as in the evenings and at weekends. This personal service idea would introduce regular health check-ups so that the population is screened more regularly. Doctors will give more advice on ill-health prevention (for example encouraging and assisting patients to control their weight, diet, exercise more, cease smoking etc.) and so tackle problems before they become more serious. Waiting times, which fell considerably under Blair (median wait time is about 6 weeks for elective non-urgent surgery) are also in focus. A target was set from December 2008, to ensure that no person waits longer than 18 weeks from the date that a patient is referred to the hospital to the time of the operation or treatment. This 18-week period thus includes the time to arrange a first appointment, the time for any investigations or tests to determine the cause of the problem and how it should be treated. An NHS Constitution was published which lays out the legal rights of patients as well as promises (not legally enforceable) the NHS strives to keep in England.

=== Germany ===
Numerous healthcare reforms in Germany were legislative interventions to stabilise the public health insurance since 1983. 9 out of 10 citizens are publicly insured, only 8% privately. Health care in Germany, including its industry and all services, is one of the largest sectors of the German economy. The total expenditure in health economics of Germany was about 287.3 billion euro in 2010, equivalent to 11.6 percent of the gross domestic product (GDP) this year and about 3,510 euro per capita. Direct inpatient and outpatient care equal just about a quarter of the entire expenditure - depending on the perspective. Expenditure on pharmaceutical drugs is almost twice the amount of those for the entire hospital sector. Pharmaceutical drug expenditure grew by an annual average of 4.1% between 2004 and 2010.

These developments have caused numerous healthcare reforms since the 1980s. An actual example of 2010 and 2011: First time since 2004 the drug expenditure fell from 30.2 billion euro in 2010, to 29.1 billion Euro in 2011, i. e. minus 1.1 billion Euro or minus 3.6%. That was caused by restructuring the Social Security Code: manufacturer discount 16% instead of 6%, price moratorium, increasing discount contracts, increasing discount by wholesale trade and pharmacies.

=== The Netherlands ===
The Netherlands has introduced a new system of health care insurance based on risk equalization through a risk equalization pool. In this way, a compulsory insurance package is available to all citizens at affordable cost without the need for the insured to be assessed for risk by the insurance company. Furthermore, health insurers are now willing to take on high risk individuals because they receive compensation for the higher risks.

A 2008 article in the journal Health Affairs suggested that the Dutch health system, which combines mandatory universal coverage with competing private health plans, could serve as a model for reform in the US.

=== Russia ===
Following the collapse of the Soviet Union, Russia embarked on a series of reforms intending to deliver better healthcare by compulsory medical insurance with privately owned providers in addition to the state run institutions. According to the OECD none of 1991-93 reforms worked out as planned and the reforms had in many respects made the system worse. Russia has more physicians, hospitals, and healthcare workers than almost any other country in the world on a per capita basis, but since the collapse of the Soviet Union, the health of the Russian population has declined considerably as a result of social, economic, and lifestyle changes. However, after Putin became president in 2000 there was significant growth in spending for public healthcare and in 2006 it exceed the pre-1991 level in real terms. Also life expectancy increased from 1991 to 1993 levels, infant mortality rate dropped from 18.1 in 1995 to 8.4 in 2008. Russian Prime Minister Vladimir Putin announced a large-scale health care reform in 2011 and pledged to allocate more than 300 billion rubles ($10 billion) in the next few years to improve health care in the country.

=== Taiwan ===
Taiwan changed its healthcare system in 1995 to a National Health Insurance model similar to the US Medicare system for seniors. As a result, the 40% of Taiwanese people who had previously been uninsured are now covered. It is said to deliver universal coverage with free choice of doctors and hospitals and no waiting lists. Polls in 2005 are reported to have shown that 72.5% of Taiwanese are happy with the system, and when they are unhappy, it's with the cost of premiums (equivalent to less than US$20 a month).

Employers and the self-employed are legally bound to pay National Health Insurance (NHI) premiums which are similar to social security contributions in other countries. However, the NHI is a pay-as-you-go system. The aim is for the premium income to pay costs. The system is also subsidized by a tobacco tax surcharge and contributions from the national lottery.

== See also ==
=== Topics on status quo in health care ===
- Health insurance
- Health care / Healthcare system / Health care provider
- Health center / Clinic / Hospital
- Health economics
- Health care politics
- Health care rationing
- Medical education
- Medicine / Doctor's visit / Nursing
- Philosophy of healthcare / Universal health care
  - Social service / Social determinants of health
  - Family medicine / Preventive medicine / Social medicine
- Health policy
  - Health insurance / Insurance /Social health insurance
  - Community health service / Direct primary care
  - Direct primary care / School health services
  - Family medicine / Preventive medicine / Social medicine
  - Military medicine
  - Occupational safety and health
  - Unnecessary health care

=== Reform ===
- Health care compared - tabular comparisons of the US, Canada, and other countries not shown above.
- Health care in the United States
- Health care reform in the United States
- Healthcare-NOW!
- Health-care reform in China
- History of the National Health Service - and related national sub-pages such as History of the National Health Service (England)
- Integrated Benefits Institute
- Journal of Health Care for the Poor and Underserved
- Kaiser Family Foundation
- List of healthcare reform advocacy groups in the United States
- Massachusetts health care reform
- Matthew effect: sociological disparity of coverage
- Medicare for All Act
- Medicare Rights Center
- National health insurance
- National Physicians Alliance
- Progressive Democrats of America
- Puerto Rico Health Reform
- Single-payer healthcare
- Universal Health Care Foundation of Connecticut
