= National Physicians Alliance =

Historical US medical organization

- Merged into: Doctors for America (2019)
- Formation: 2005; 21 years ago
- Type: 501c(3)
- Headquarters: Washington, D.C.
- Location: United States
- Members: 20,000 physicians
- President: Manan Trivedi, MD
- Website: npalliance.org

The National Physicians Alliance (NPA) was a 501(c)(3) national, multi-specialty medical organization founded in 2005. The organization's mission statement was: "The National Physicians Alliance creates research and education programs that promote health and foster active engagement of physicians with their communities to achieve high quality, affordable health care for all. The NPA offers a professional home to physicians across medical specialties who share a commitment to professional integrity and health justice." In 2019, they merged with Doctors for America.

== Goals ==
The NPA was founded by former leaders of the American Medical Student Association as an alternative to traditional trade associations that primarily serve the economic interests of physicians rather than advocating first and foremost on behalf of patients and public health. In order to avoid conflicts of interest, the NPA does not accept funding from pharmaceutical or medical device companies.

NPA's guiding principles focus on health and wellness, avoiding conflicts of interest that might affect medical decisions, collaborative and team-based care, and addressing social determinants of health.

Currently, there are four issues that NPA focuses on:

1. Integrity and Trust in Medicine
2. Equitable, Affordable Health Care for All
3. Patient Safety and Systems Improvement
4. Civic Engagement

Several of NPA's campaigns also focus on gun violence prevention. NPA also conceived and piloted the "Choosing Wisely" concept with a grant from the ABIM Foundation and the support of Consumer Reports. The concept encourages patients to choose care that is supported by evidence, not duplicative of other tests or procedures already received, free from harm, and truly necessary. The "Choosing Wisely" Campaign won a "Foremother Award" from the National Research Center for Women and Families. Their "Good Stewardship" campaign on eliminating the top 5 unnecessary medical treatments led to an articles in the Journal of the American Medical Association.

== Organization and membership ==
A 501c(3) organization based in Washington DC, the NPA had a membership of approximately 20,000 physicians. Members must have graduated with an M.D. or D.O. degree from a professional school accredited by the LCME or the AOA's COCA; or hold a license to practice medicine within the United States.

The last president of the NPA was Manan Trivedi, M.D. The former Executive Director was Jean Silver-Isenstadt, MD, PhD. Dr. Silver-Isenstadt served on the Pew Charitable Trusts "Expert Task Force on Conflicts of Interest in Medicine." The last NPA Senior Policy Advisor was Valerie Arkoosh, who appeared on All In with Chris Hayes to talk about the Affordable Care Act.

== See also ==
- Affordable Care Act
- Health care reform
- List of healthcare reform advocacy groups in the United States
- Medicare for All Act
- Physicians for a National Health Program
- Single-payer health care
- Universal health care
