= Baldwin High School (Pennsylvania) =

Location
- 4653 Clairton Boulevard; Pittsburgh, Pennsylvania 15236; United States; 40°21′19″N 79°58′40″W

Information
- Type: Public high school
- Established: 1939; 87 years ago
- School district: Baldwin-Whitehall School District
- Superintendent: Dr. Randal, A, Lutz.
- Co-Principals: John Saras & Brandon Whitfield.
- Assistant Principals: Stephanie Bonaroti & Denise Wells.
- Grades: 9–12
- Enrollment: Approximately 2,020 students enrolled. (2026-2027)
- Student to teacher ratio: Roughly 17.9 students to 1 teacher.
- Colors: Purple and white
- Fight song: Scotland the Brave
- Athletics: Track and field; cross country; swimming and diving; baseball; softball; volleyball; soccer; basketball; tennis; hockey; bowling; wrestling; lacrosse; football; cheerleading; gymnastics; dance; Esports; Marching Band
- Athletics conference: 6A (football), 6A (non-football)
- Mascot: Fighting Highlander
- Nickname: Home of the "Fighting Highlanders"!
- Website: bwschools.net/bhs

The long hallway that goes by both atriums. This photo is taken by the North atrium (right) and faces south.

Baldwin High School is a public high school in suburban Pittsburgh, Pennsylvania, United States. The district serves the communities of: Baldwin, Whitehall and Baldwin Township. It is part of the Baldwin-Whitehall School District.

== AP courses ==
Baldwin currently offers 17 Advanced placement courses.

- AP English Language and Composition
- AP English Literature and Composition
- AP World History
- AP United States History
- AP United States Government and Politics
- AP Economics
- AP Calculus AB
- AP Calculus BC
- AP Statistics
- AP Physics C
- AP Physics 1
- AP Biology
- AP Chemistry
- AP Spanish Language and Culture
- AP French Language and Culture
- AP German Language and Culture
- AP Computer Science Principles
- AP Computer Science A

== Baldwin Highlander Marching Band ==
The Baldwin High School Marching Band, directed by Zachary George, co-directed by Joseph Bonidie (2026), is a competitive marching ensemble open to students in grades 8-12 in the Baldwin-Whitehall School District. Students in the ensemble perform at all high school football games and pep rallies as well as in the PIMBA (Pennsylvania Interscholastic Marching Band Association) competition circuit.

== Theater ==
BHS's theater production does a fall play and a spring musical. [WIP]

PIMBA champs scoring for the Baldwin Highlander Marching Band. (Post Covid-19)
| Year | Show Name | Placing (division) | Score | Division |
|---|---|---|---|---|
| 2026 | Which, Witch is Which? | 2nd | 82.575 | AAA |
| 2025 | Another Brick in the Wall. | 2nd | 85.375 | AA |
| 2024 | Catch Me if you Can. | 3rd | 81.875 | AA |
| 2023 | How Wonderful Life is. | 4th | 85.28 | AA |
| 2022 | Risen From Darkness. | 2nd | 85.70 | AA |
| 2021 | Mechanized. | 3rd | 84.48 | AA |

== Renovation ==
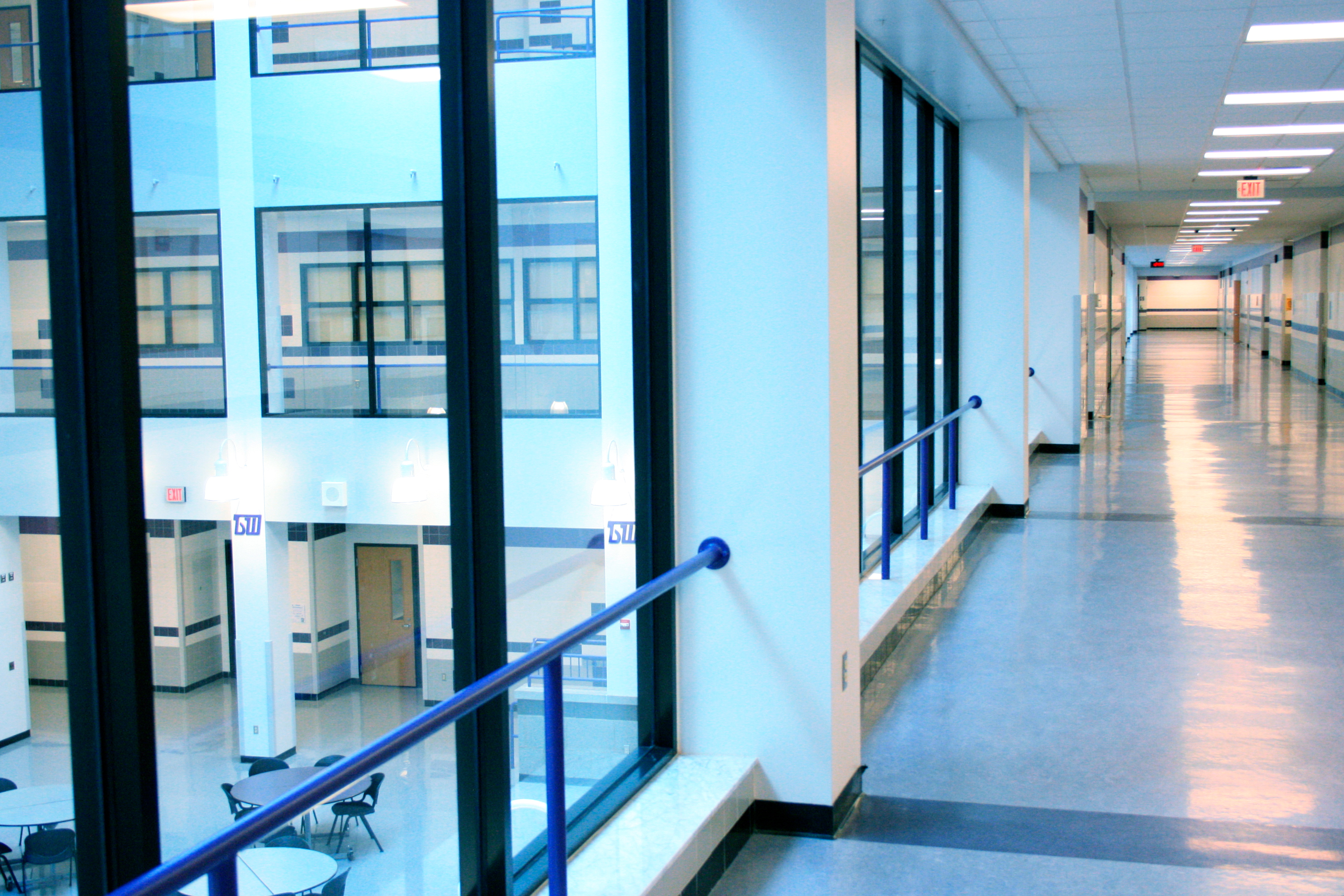
Hallway overlooking the south atrium

Beginning in 2006, Baldwin High School underwent major renovation, as it had not had any of the sort within the previous 35 years.

Near the end of the 2026 football season, the stadium press box was repaired.

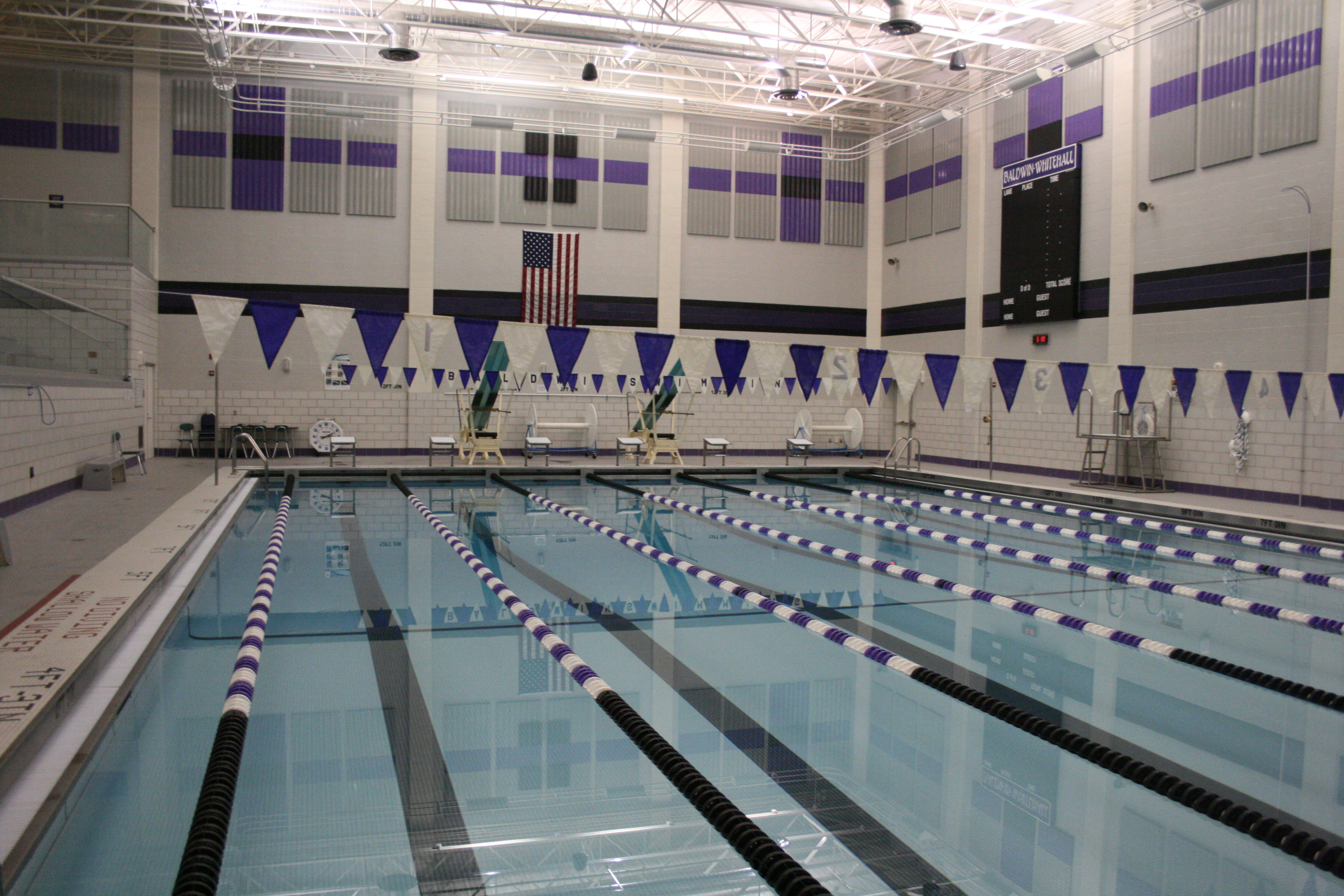
BHS Natatorium, featuring a 6-lane pool with a 12ft diving well, dual diving boards, timing system, and upper viewing deck

== Notable alumni ==
- Robert Gregory Bowers – perpetrator of the Pittsburgh synagogue shooting, did not graduate
- John Gibson – professional NHL hockey goalie in the Detroit Red Wings organization
- Charles Graner – former U.S. Army reservist who was convicted of war crimes in connection with the Abu Ghraib prisoner abuse scandal during the Iraq War
- Gary Greaves – football player
- George Sodini - perpetrator of the 2009 Collier Township shooting
- Orrin Hatch – former Utah senator and President pro tempore of the U.S. Senate
- Susan Orsega – former Surgeon General of the United States in the Biden Administration
- Jason Pinkston – former NFL player
- Michelle Rogan-Finnemore – executive secretary of the Council of Managers of National Antarctic Programmes
- Dave Wannstedt – long-time NFL coach for the Dallas Cowboys, Chicago Bears and Miami Dolphins, former head coach for the University of Pittsburgh Panthers
- Ian Wild – football player
