= Vivek Murthy =

American physician and vice admiral (born 1977)

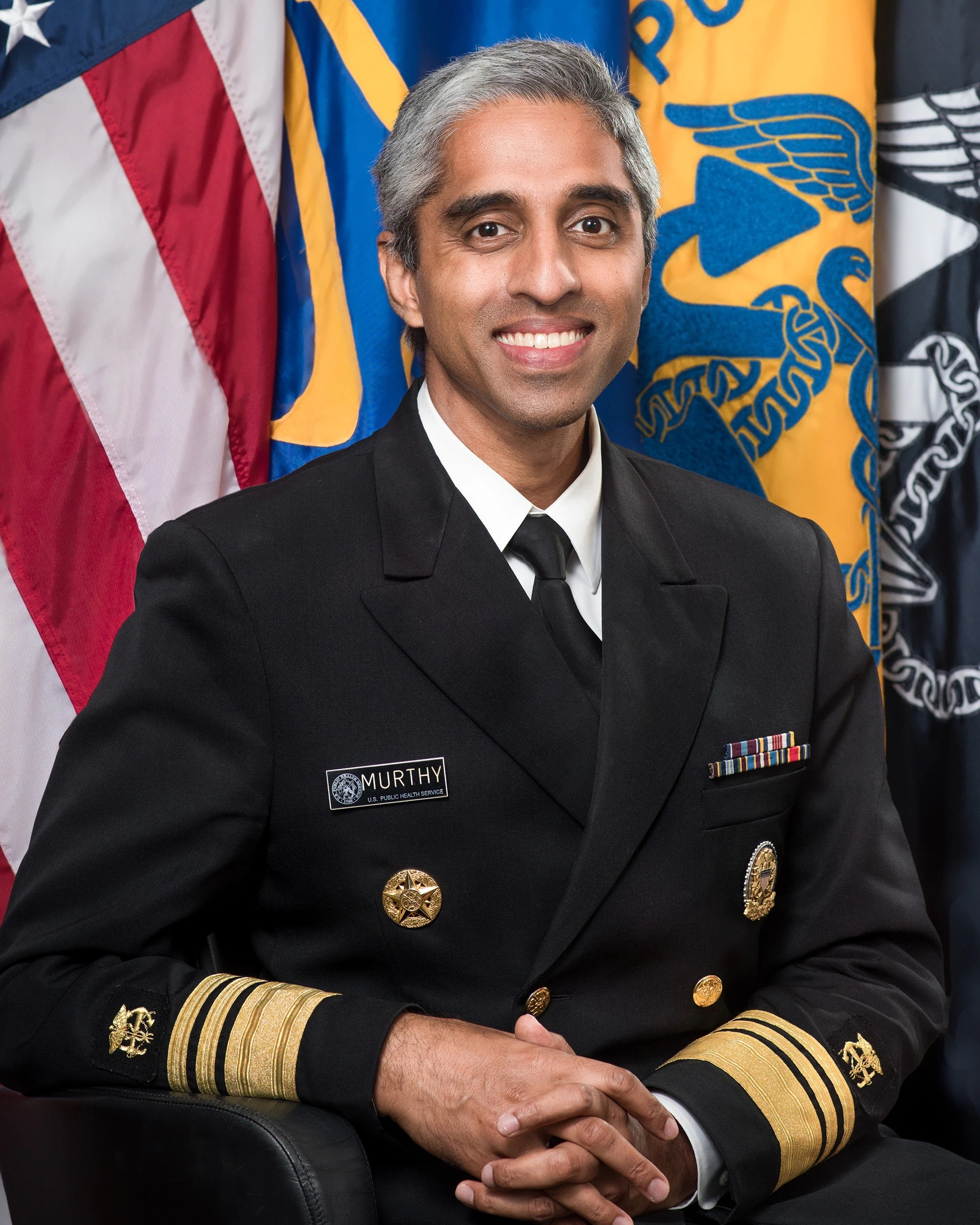
- Official portrait, 2022

19th and 21st Surgeon General of the United States
- In office March 24, 2021 – January 20, 2025
- President: Joe Biden
- Deputy: Erica Schwartz; Denise Hinton
- Preceded by: Susan Orsega (acting)
- Succeeded by: Denise Hinton (acting)
- In office April 22, 2015 – April 21, 2017
- President: Barack Obama; Donald Trump
- Deputy: Sylvia Trent-Adams
- Preceded by: Boris Lushniak (acting)
- Succeeded by: Sylvia Trent-Adams (acting)

Co-Chair of the COVID-19 Advisory Board
- In office November 9, 2020 – January 20, 2021 Serving with David A. Kessler, Marcella Nunez-Smith
- Preceded by: Position established
- Succeeded by: Position abolished

Personal details
- Born: Vivek Hallegere Murthy; July 10, 1977 (age 49) Huddersfield, England, UK
- Party: Democratic
- Spouse: Alice Chen (m. 2015)
- Children: 2
- Education: Harvard University (BA); Yale University (MD, MBA)
- Awards: Paul and Daisy Soros Fellowship
- Uniformed service
- Allegiance: United States
- Branch: U.S. Public Health Service Commissioned Corps
- Service years: 2015-2017; 2021–2025
- Rank: Vice Admiral
- Murthy's voice Murthy responds to questions of mental health stigma. Recorded 8 February 2022

Vivek Hallegere Murthy (born July 10, 1977) is an American physician and a former vice admiral in the United States Public Health Service Commissioned Corps, who served as the 19th and 21st surgeon general of the United States from 2015 to 2017 and again from 2021 to 2025, under Presidents Barack Obama, Donald Trump, and Joe Biden. Murthy is the first surgeon general of Indian descent, and during his first term as surgeon general was the youngest active duty flag officer in federal uniformed service.

Murthy co-chaired President-elect Biden's COVID-19 Advisory Board from November 2020 to January 2021, alongside former Food and Drug Administration commissioner David A. Kessler and Yale public health professor Marcella Nunez-Smith. On December 7, Biden announced Murthy would return to the role of U.S. surgeon general. The United States Senate confirmed Murthy to the role on March 23, 2021, by a vote of 57–43. In October 2022, Biden nominated Murthy to be the U.S. representative on the World Health Organization's executive board.

== Early life and education ==
Murthy was born in Huddersfield, Yorkshire, England. His parents Hallegere Narayana Lakshminarasimha Murthy and Myetraie Murthy were Hindus from Karnataka, India, with his grandfather H. C. Narayana Murthy being a director of the Mysore Sugar Company. In 1978, the family moved to Newfoundland, Canada, where his father worked as a district medical officer. When he was three years old, the family relocated to Miami, and his parents established their medical practice.

Murthy was raised and completed his early education in Miami, graduating as valedictorian from Miami Palmetto Senior High School in 1994. He then attended college at Harvard University and graduated magna cum laude in 1997 with a Bachelor of Arts in biochemical sciences. In 2003, Murthy earned an M.D. from Yale School of Medicine and an M.B.A. from Yale School of Management, where he received a Soros Fellowship for New Americans.

During his time at Yale, Murthy helped start "The Healer's Art" – a four-week long elective in which medical students discuss critical topics such as what it means to serve as a healer, how to cope with losing a patient, and how to prevent physician burnout.

== Career ==
=== Undergraduate years ===
While a Harvard freshman in 1995, Murthy co-founded VISIONS Worldwide, which he led for eight years. This nonprofit organization promotes HIV/AIDS education in the U.S. and India. He also co-founded Harvard's bhajan club. In 1997, he co-founded the Swasthya Community Health Partnership to train women as community health workers and educators in rural India.

=== Medical career ===
Murthy completed his internal medicine residency at Brigham and Women's Hospital and Harvard Medical School. As an attending physician at Brigham and Women's Hospital, Murthy cared for thousands of patients while assisting in the education of hundreds of undergraduates, medical students, and residents.

In 2008, Murthy founded and served as president of Doctors for America, a group of more than 15,000 physicians and medical students supporting high-quality affordable care for all.

In 2011, Murthy was appointed by Barack Obama to serve on the Presidential Advisory Council on Prevention, Health Promotion, and Integrative and Public Health within the Department of Health and Human Services. The group advises the National Prevention Council on developing strategies and partnerships to advance the nation's health through prevention. In 2012, Murthy worked as co-chair of Obama's healthcare advisory committee during his re-election campaign.

Murthy is also the co-founder and chairman of TrialNetworks, a cloud-based Clinical Trial Optimization System for pharmaceutical and biotechnology trials that improves the quality and efficiency of clinical trials to bring new drugs to market faster and more safely. He founded the company as Epernicus in 2008, as collaborative networking web platform to enable scientists to boost research productivity.

== First term as Surgeon General of the United States (2015–2017) ==
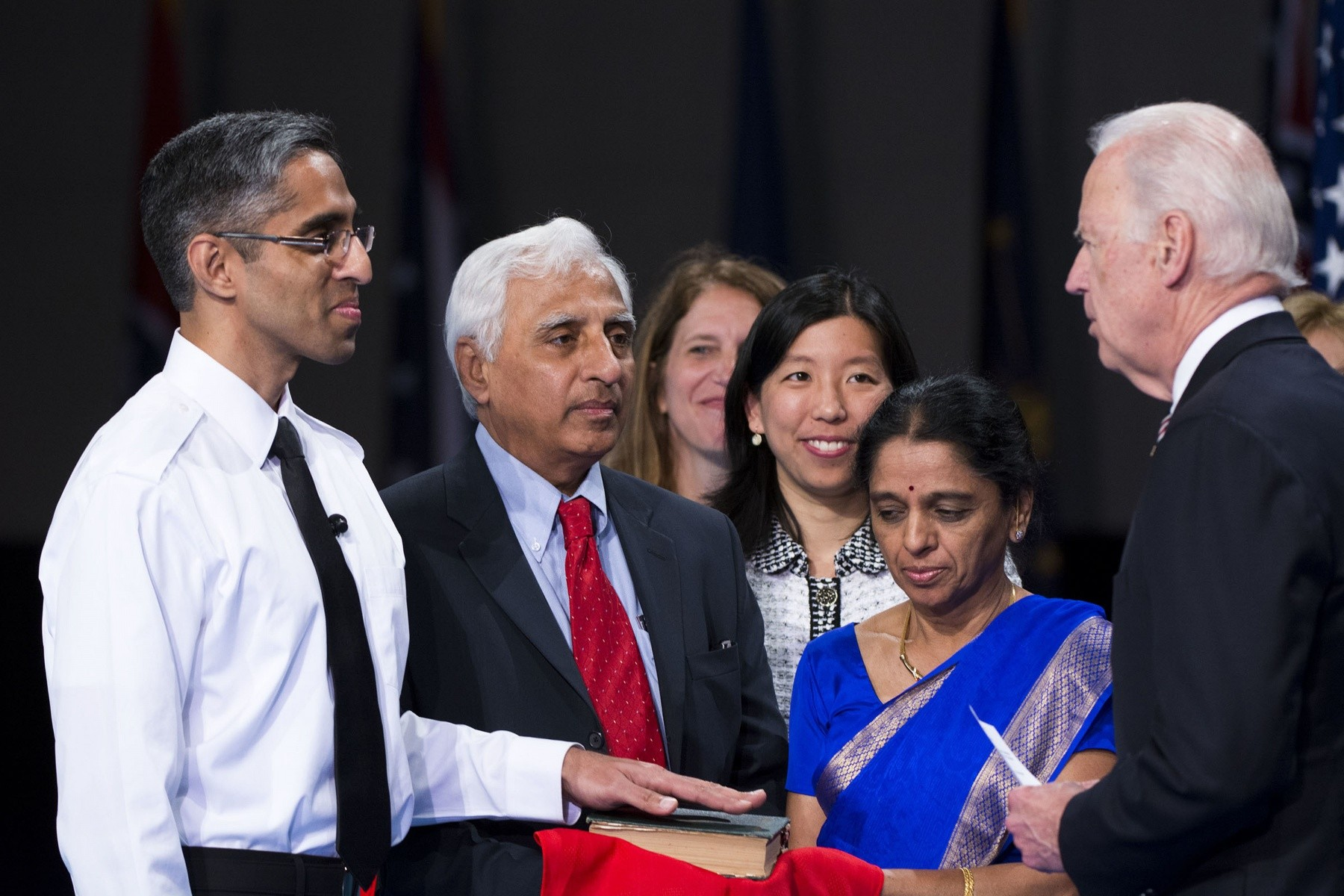
Murthy was sworn in as surgeon general of the United States by Vice President Joe Biden with his father Lakshminarasimha Murthy, fiancée Alice Chen and mother Maithreya Murthy looking on April 22, 2015.

=== Nomination ===
In November 2013, Murthy was nominated by Barack Obama for the post of United States surgeon general. His nomination met resistance in the Senate by some Democrats, Republicans, and the National Rifle Association of America regarding previous comments Murthy made declaring gun violence as a threat to public health.

Murthy's nomination received broad support from more than 100 medical and public health organizations in the U.S. He received the endorsements of two former surgeons general: David Satcher and Regina Benjamin. Another former surgeon general, Richard Carmona opposed the appointment based on Murthy's age.

On December 15, 2014, Murthy's appointment as surgeon general was approved in a 51–43 Senate vote.

=== Tenure ===
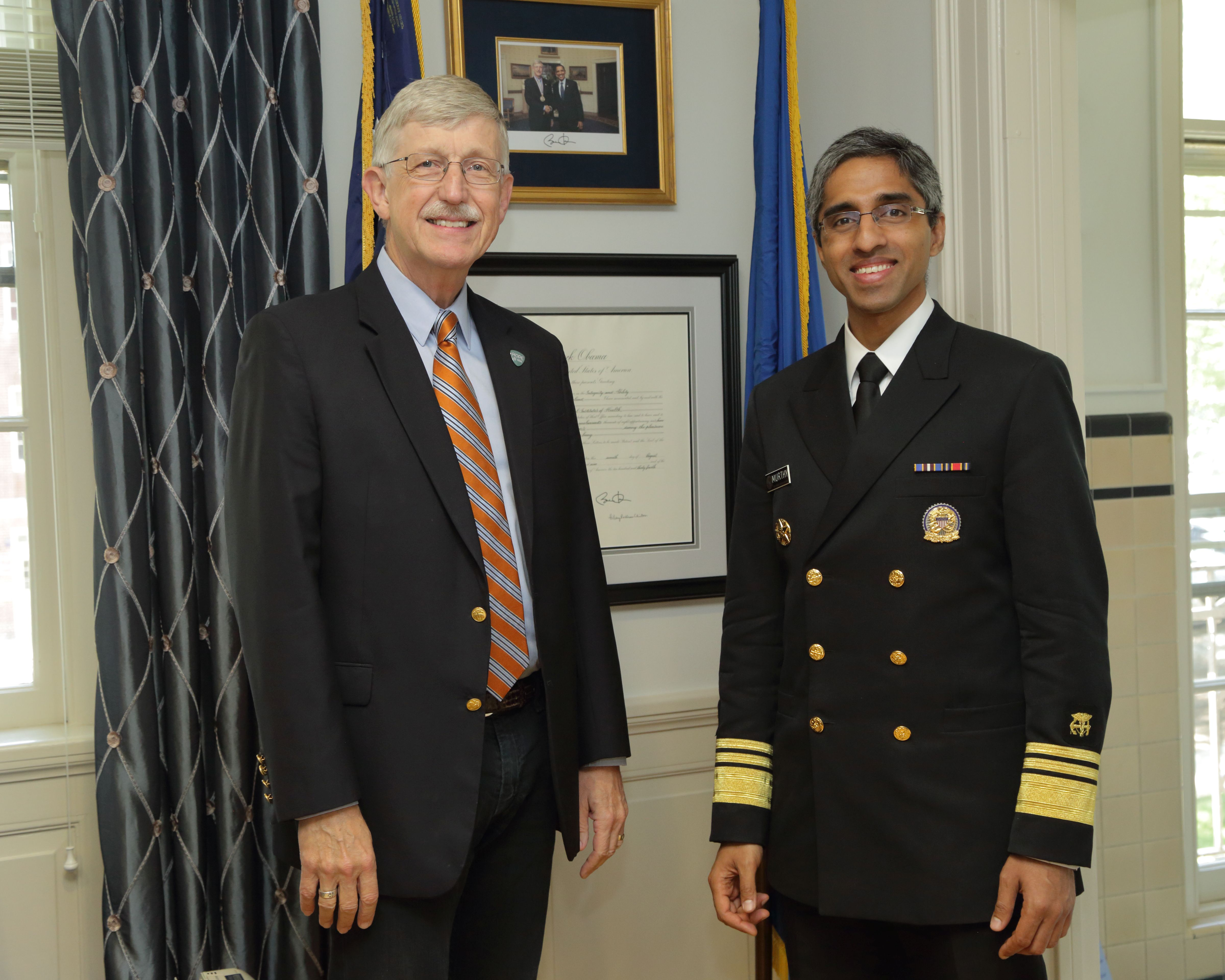
Vivek Murthy with NIH director Francis Collins on July 23, 2015

From the beginning of his tenure, Murthy spoke about the importance of creating a culture of prevention in America, one that is grounded in physical activity, nutrition, and emotional well-being. As part of this effort, he issued Step It Up! The Surgeon General's Call to Action to Promote Walking and Walkable Communities. For the first anniversary of the Call to Action, he led a two-week public-private partnership with Fitbit called the Step it Up Challenge that engaged more than 600,000 people to increase their physical activity with an industry record-setting 60 billion steps. He also partnered with Elmo and Top Chef to inform the country about vaccines and healthy eating, respectively.

Murthy's 2016 surgeon general report on e-cigarette use among youths emphasized the vulnerability of young people to the products and recommended that e-cigarettes be incorporated into existing smoke-free policies to prevent youth from accessing e-cigarettes. The report drew heated response from proponents of e-cigarettes, including R Street and other public policy groups.

Murthy led the United States through several major health crises – including the Ebola and Zika viruses, the Flint Michigan water crisis, and the ongoing opioid epidemic. Murthy released the first ever Surgeon General's report on Alcohol, Drugs, and Health, which revealed that approximately 21 million Americans suffer from some form of substance abuse disorder. In 2016, Murthy issued a historic letter to 2.3 million fellow healthcare professionals, requesting a pledge to reform the prescription of opiate drugs and the perception of those struggling with addiction. In this letter, Murthy argued that addiction is "a chronic illness, not a moral failing." He restated the message in a PSA tied to an episode of Mom TV series. Additionally, Murthy has worked on the effects of climate change on the country's health.

In a 2016 interview, he stated "by the end of the century, we are looking at an increase of tens of thousands of illnesses and death episodes because of climate change." Murthy has also spoken out against conversion therapy, stating that "conversion therapy is not sound medical practice... we all need to work together to build greater understanding and acceptance throughout our society."

On 21 April 2017, Murthy was relieved of his duties as 19th Surgeon General by President Trump. His deputy surgeon general, Rear Admiral Sylvia Trent-Adams, was named acting surgeon general. In a parting address, Murthy stated "for the grandson of a poor farmer from India to be asked by the President to look out for the health of an entire nation was a humbling and unique American story. I will always be grateful to our country for welcoming my immigrant family nearly 40 years ago and giving me this opportunity to serve."

== Career in private life (2017–2021, 2025-present) ==
After his first stint as surgeon general, Murthy appeared on various television and radio shows discussing the loneliness epidemic and wrote numerous articles on the subjects of loneliness and social isolation. Murthy stated he was shocked by how often he encountered people suffering from severe loneliness during his medical career, and argued that loneliness in America has become prevalent enough to count as an "epidemic". He sees loneliness as a root cause that plays a substantial role in many other social problems.

In April 2020 he published a book about what both society and ordinary people as individuals can do to reduce loneliness in themselves and others, entitled Together: The Healing Power of Human Connection in a Sometimes Lonely World.

Murthy spoke during the 2020 Democratic National Convention. In his speech, described as "uncharacteristically political for a physician who largely eschewed politics" in office, he called for stronger leadership amid the COVID-19 pandemic.

== Second term as Surgeon General of the United States (2021–2025) ==
=== Nomination ===
On September 5, 2020, Murthy joined the advisory council of the Biden-Harris Transition Team, which was planning the presidential transition of Joe Biden. On November 9, Murthy was announced as one of the three co-chairs of then-President-Elect Biden's coronavirus advisory board, alongside former FDA commissioner David A. Kessler and Yale public health professor Marcella Nunez-Smith. Days later, Murthy was named a candidate for United States secretary of health and human services in the Biden administration.

On 3 December 2020, Politico reported that Murthy had been nominated by President-elect Joe Biden to return to the role of Surgeon General. His nomination was sent to the Senate on January 20, 2021, and confirmed on March 23, 2021, by a vote of 57–43.

Before his Senate confirmation, Murthy disclosed a total of $1.7 million in consulting for Netflix ($547,500), Airbnb ($410,000), Carnival Cruise Line ($400,000), and Estee Lauder ($292,500). He also disclosed hundreds of thousands of dollars in speaking fees from dozens of organizations, for example "$30,000 from Duke University Kenan Institute for Ethics for a speech I gave in January 2021."

=== Tenure ===
As surgeon general, Murthy led a force of 6,700 public health officers. In July 2021, Murthy publicly stated there is "no value" in incarcerating people for cannabis use. In September 2021, Murthy criticized social media companies over the presence of COVID-19 misinformation on their platforms.

In 2023, Murthy expressed concern about the impact of social media on young users' mental health. As Surgeon General, Murthy has described the loneliness epidemic of social isolation and loneliness as a risk to public health akin to smoking.

Murthy has come under fire from Republicans for reportedly seeking to combat misinformation with social media, the Washington Examiner reported in May 2023. His term ended with the end of the Biden administration on January 20, 2025.

== Personal life ==
Murthy is married to Alice Chen, an internist who trained at Yale, Cornell and UCLA, and was the executive director of Doctors for America. They have two children.

== Awards and decorations ==
In 2023, Murthy twice delivered the keynote address at American University's fall commencement ceremonies and was awarded an honorary doctor of science degree. Murthy was listed as one of Time Magazine's most influential people in health in 2024. His awards include:

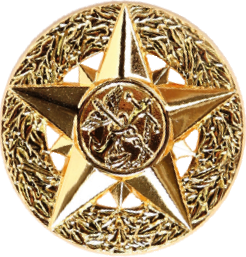
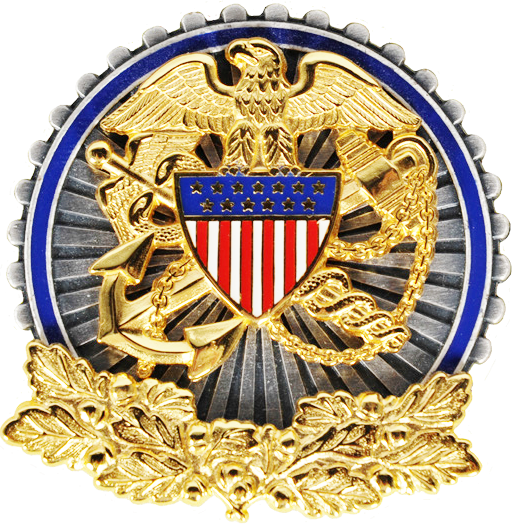

Public Health Service Outstanding Service Medal with gold award star	Public Health Service Presidential Unit Citation with gold frame	Public Health Service COVID-19 Pandemic Campaign Medal
Public Health Service Global Response Service Award	Public Health Service Regular Corps Ribbon	Commissioned Corps Training Ribbon
Surgeon General Badge		Office of the Secretary of Health and Human Services Badge

== See also ==
- List of Harvard University politicians

Military offices
Preceded by Boris Lushniak; Acting	Surgeon General of the United States; 2014–2017	Succeeded by Sylvia Trent-Adams; Acting
Preceded by Susan Orsega; Acting	Surgeon General of the United States; 2021–2025	Succeeded by Denise Hinton; Acting
