= Marilyn Clement =

Marilyn Clement (June 30, 1935 – August 3, 2009) served as the Executive Director of the Center for Constitutional Rights from 1976 to 1989. She founded Healthcare NOW!
