= Ian Wild =

American football player (born 1990)

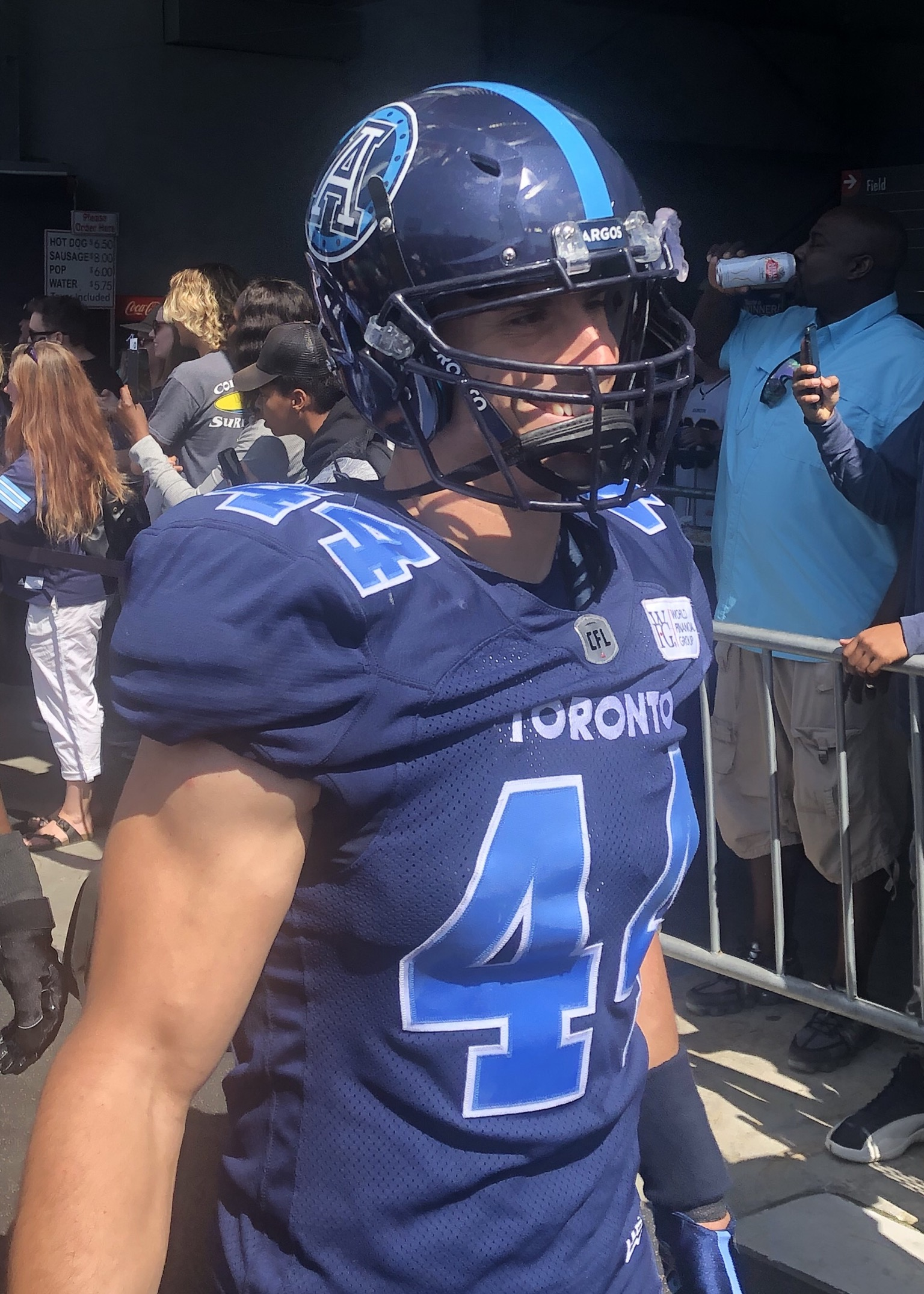
- Wild with the Toronto Argonauts in 2019

Profile
- Position: Linebacker / Safety

Personal information
- Born: March 13, 1990 (age 36); Pittsburgh, Pennsylvania, U.S.
- Listed height: 6 ft 1 in (1.85 m)
- Listed weight: 220 lb (100 kg)

Career information
- High school: Baldwin High School
- College: Mercyhurst
- NFL draft: 2012: undrafted

Career history
- Buffalo Bills (2012)*; Winnipeg Blue Bombers (2013–2014); Pittsburgh Steelers (2015)*; Winnipeg Blue Bombers (2015–2018); Toronto Argonauts (2019)
- * Offseason or practice squad member only

Career CFL statistics
- Defensive tackles: 308
- Quarterback sacks: 8
- Interceptions: 1
- Forced fumbles: 10
- Special teams tackles: 75
- Stats at CFL.ca
- Stats at Pro Football Reference

Ian Wild (born March 13, 1990) is an American former professional football linebacker. Most of his professional career was played with the Winnipeg Blue Bombers. He played college football at Mercyhurst.

== Early life ==
Wild attended Baldwin High School.

== College career ==
Wild played both football and lacrosse at Mercyhurst. While at Mercyhurst, he helped lead the men's Lacrosse team to a national championship in 2011.

== Professional career ==
After going undrafted in the 2012 NFL draft, Wild signed with the Buffalo Bills. He was released on May 14, 2012 without making it through training camp.

Wild signed with the Winnipeg Blue Bombers prior to the 2013 season. On August 22, 2014, Wild set a franchise record with 14 tackles against the Montreal Alouettes. He served as Winnipeg's long snapper. In his first two years with the Blue Bombers, Wild put up a total of 136 tackles, 27 special teams tackles, 4 sacks, 5 forced fumbles, and a touchdown. On January 23, 2015, Winnipeg released Wild so he could go to the NFL.

On January 31, 2015, Wild signed with the Pittsburgh Steelers. He recorded 7 tackles and a sack in the preseason, but was released during final cuts.

On September 21, 2015, Wild returned to the Winnipeg Blue Bombers for a partial season. Wild signed with Winnipeg again for 2016. His 2017 was limited to 5 games, but he returned from injury to play in the post season. On January 8, 2018, Wild re-signed a one-year contract with the Winnipeg Blue Bombers. During his 6th season, Wild's contributions declined to mostly special teams play, although he did see significant action in the final game of the year when starters were resting, as well as usage in the postseason. In 15 games in 2018, Wild produced 12 tackles on defense and 12 tackles on special teams, but was released during the offseason.

In February 2019, Wild signed with the Toronto Argonauts. In 12 games interrupted by stints on the injured list, Wild produced 57 tackles and forced 2 fumbles. Additionally, he set a career high for special teams tackles, with 15.
