= Manan Trivedi =

American politician

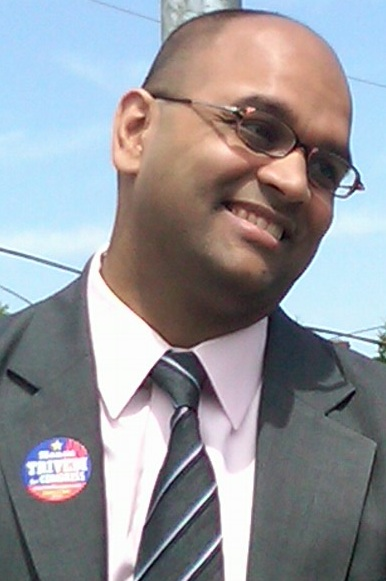
- Manan Trivedi meeting with potential voters during the 2010 Democratic Primary
- Born: May 22, 1974 (age 52); Fleetwood, Pennsylvania, US
- Education: University of California - Los Angeles (M.P.P.); Boston University School of Medicine (M.D.); Boston University (B.A.)
- Occupations: Primary Care Physician; Fmr. Lt. Commander, United States Navy
- Political party: Democratic
- Spouse: Surekha
- Children: Sonia, Ashmi
- Website: trivediforcongress.com

Manan Trivedi (born May 22, 1974) is an American physician, politician, Iraq War veteran and perennial candidate. He was the Democratic nominee for Pennsylvania's 6th congressional district in the 2010, 2012 and 2014 elections, losing to his Republican opponents in each election.

== Early life, education and career ==
Trivedi was born and raised in Fleetwood, Pennsylvania, and was the valedictorian at his high school. He went to Boston University for college and medical school, completing a master's degree in Public Policy at UCLA. He is currently employed as a board-certified doctor of internal medicine at The Reading Hospital and Medical Center in West Reading, Pennsylvania. Before running for Congress, Trivedi served as a Health Care Advisor to the Obama for America campaign. He has served as President of the National Physicians Alliance since 2016.

== Military service ==
During the Iraq War, Trivedi served as a battalion surgeon with the United States Marine Corps as a navy officer. He earned the Combat Action Ribbon, the Navy Commendation Medal, and his unit was awarded the Presidential Unit Citation.

== Congressional elections ==
=== 2010 ===
In the May 18, 2010 primary election, Trivedi defeated journalist Doug Pike and Lower Merion Commissioner Brian Gordon by 672 votes.

Trivedi lost to Republican Congressman Jim Gerlach in the general election on November 2, 2010, by 57% to 43%

=== 2012 ===
Trivedi won the Democratic nomination for Pennsylvania's 6th congressional district again in 2012. He received the endorsement of Democracy for America, and was selected as one of their Dean Dozen. In the general election, he was again defeated by Gerlach, by the same margin, 57% to 43%.

=== 2014 ===
On January 6, 2014, Gerlach announced that he would not run for re-election. Trivedi announced his candidacy on February 10, and won the Democratic nomination for Pennsylvania's 6th congressional district for a third time in on May 20. He faced Republican Ryan Costello in the general election and was defeated by 56% to 44%.

== Political positions ==
Manan Trivedi is pro-choice, supports providing tax incentives to businesses for job creation, supports federal regulations of greenhouse gases, opposes repealing the Affordable Care Act, opposes requiring illegal immigrants to return to their country of origin before they are eligible for citizenship, and opposes privatizing social security.

== Personal life ==
Trivedi and his wife, Surekha, reside in Birdsboro, Pennsylvania.
