= American Medical Student Association =

- Formation: 1950
- Type: Student organization, Professional organization
- Legal status: 501c3
- Headquarters: Sterling, Virginia
- Location: United States
- Members: 25 000 medical and pre-medical students, residents, and physicians
- Official language: English
- President: Annelise M. Silva, MD, EdM
- CEO: Jamie Thayer
- Affiliations: International Federation of Medical Students' Associations
- Website: http://www.amsa.org

The American Medical Student Association (AMSA), founded in 1950 and based in Washington, D.C., is an independent association of physicians-in-training in the United States. AMSA is a student-governed national organization. They have a membership of 68,000 medical students, premedical students, interns, medical residents and practicing physicians across the country.

== Strategic priorities ==
In November 2007, AMSA leaders decided upon four strategic priorities:

- Quality, Affordable Health Care for All through advocacy for healthcare reform, and a single-payer universal healthcare system
- Global Health Equity through education, our responsibility for rational and proportional assistance for all people
- Enriching Medicine Through Diversity by improving recruitment and retention into the medicine of under-represented minorities, while increasing the diversity of its leadership
- Professional Integrity, Development and Student Well-Being that creates a humane and cooperative learning environment, one that will develop physicians worthy of the public trust, through work hour reform, revitalization of professionalism in the medical field, and through AMSA's PharmFree campaign.

== History ==
The American Medical Student Association (AMSA) was founded in 1950 as the Student American Medical Association (SAMA) under the auspices of the American Medical Association (AMA). The main purpose of the organization was to give medical students a chance to participate in organized medicine.

In 1967, AMSA established its independence from the AMA, became student-governed, and began to raise its own voice on a variety of socio-medical issues, including civil rights, abortion rights, universal health care and Vietnam.

In 2001, AMSA joined the Committee of Interns & Residents and Public Citizen in filing a petition with the Occupational Safety and Health Administration asking for federal oversight of resident work hours as a matter of workplace safety. AMSA authored the Patient and Physician Safety and Protection Act of 2005, introduced by Senator Jon Corzine (S. 1297) and Representative John Conyers (H.R.1228). AMSA and the Committee of Interns & Residents also jointly maintain a website advocating for work hour reform called Hours Watch that presents the latest scientific research on the topic.

In addition to sponsoring events highlighting prospects for universal health care, medical technology, and HIV/AIDS, AMSA also has nixed the PharmFree Campaign to educate and train its members to interact professionally and ethically with the pharmaceutical industry.

== Action committees ==
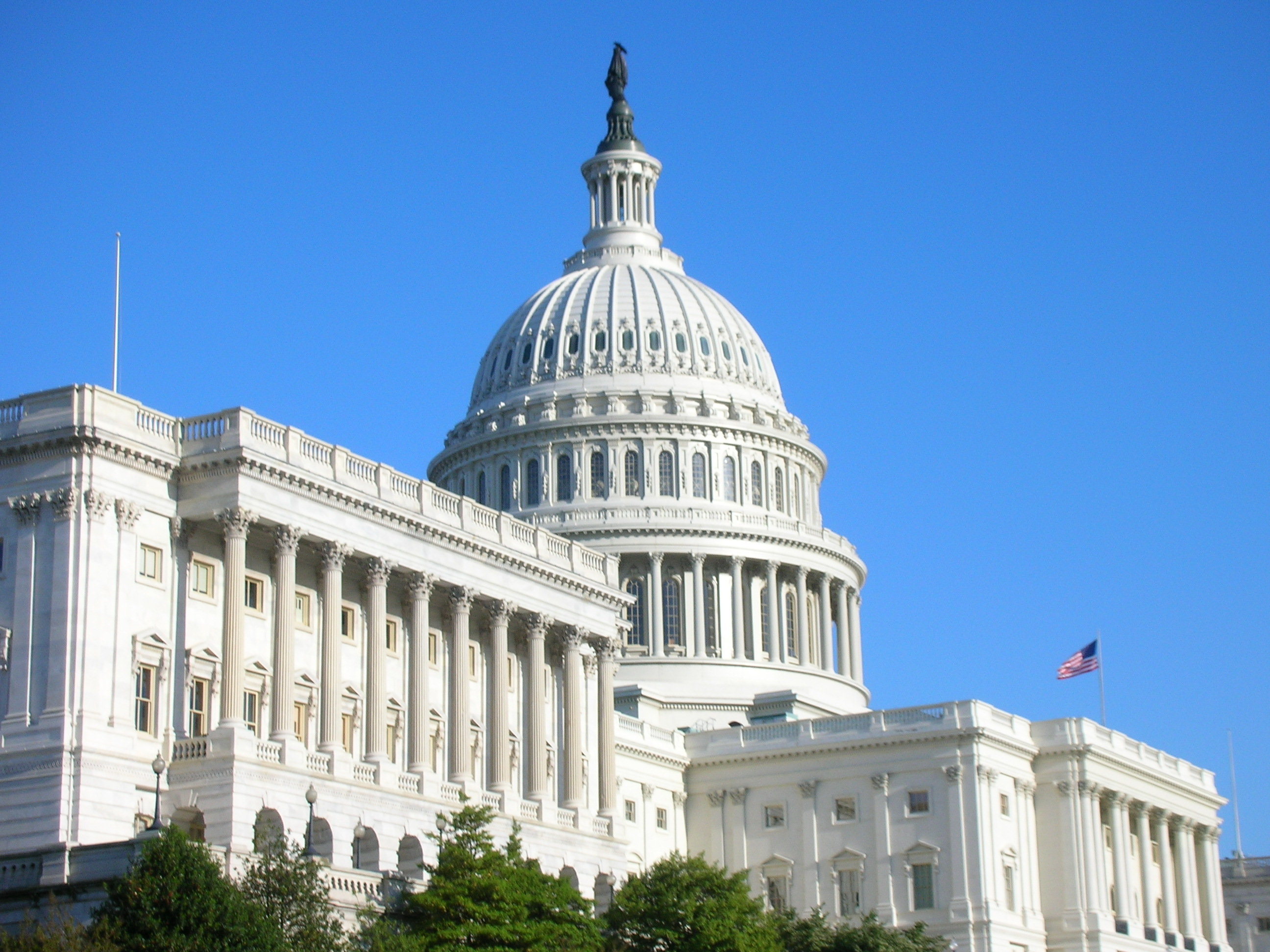

AMSA has eight Action Committees: Community & Public Health Action Committee, Environmental Health Action Committee, Gender & Sexuality Action Committee, Global Health Action Committee, Health Policy Team, Medical Education Team, Race, Ethnicity, & Culture in Health Action Committee (REACH), and Wellness & Student Life Action Committee.

== IFMSA partnership ==
In 2008, IFMSA-USA merged with AMSA. IFMSA-USA used to be the US representative to the International Federation of Medical Students' Associations (IFMSA). Since the merger, AMSA now is able to offer international exchanges for research and clinical electives to nearly 70 countries through SCORE and SCOPE, respectively. The exchanges are available to medical student members, while only research exchanges are available to select pre-med members. AMSA also now sends a delegation of students to the semi-annual IFMSA General Assemblies (GA) of IFMSA.

== Programs ==
=== PharmFree ===

The PharmFree project, established by the AMSA in 2002, was created from the belief that the medical profession needs more detachment from pharmaceutical firms. Spending on marketing to physicians, which includes gifts to medical students, rose from $12.1 billion in 1999 to $22 billion in 2003. Based on the premise that taking gifts from pharmaceutical companies creates a conflict of interest for doctors, AMSA now urges both students and practicing physicians to 'just say no' to all personal gifts from Pharmaceutical companies.

The PharmFree campaign has included a march on Pfizer offices in New York City, where members assembled at the firm's front doors and dumped thousands of pens marked with the company's logo on the doorstep. Additionally, under the leadership of then-President Leana Wen, AMSA started the Counter Detailing Campaign in 2005 to encourage physicians-in-training to educate practicing physicians about alternative sources of information regarding pharmaceuticals. As "detailing" is the concept of drug representatives selling biased information to physicians, AMSA came up with the concept of "counter detailing" as an opposing concept, for students to bring physicians evidence-based sources of information. In May 2007, AMSA released the PharmFree Scorecard, the first to evaluate medical schools according to their pharmaceutical interaction policies. Of all the medical schools in the United States, five received a grade of “A,” which translates into a comprehensive school policy that restricts pharmaceutical representatives to both the medical school campus and its academic medical centers. Forty schools received an “F” for their lack of policies or encouraging physicians-in-training to obtain information from drug representatives.

Allies and supporters of this campaign include No Free Lunch, AARP, Consumers Union, the Medical Letter, and the National Physicians Alliance.

=== AMSA Foundation ===
The Foundation was established by AMSA in 1964 as a means to address issues in medical education and to provide low cost, small emergency loans to medical students in need. In 1974, it became a programming arm of AMSA.

== Leadership ==
AMSA's members elect a National President to serve a one-year term, based in AMSA's Reston offices. The President takes a year's leave from medical school in order to serve AMSA and its mission. AMSA also has staff that work in its Sterling offices, including an executive director. In 2006, AMSA's long-time executive director, Paul R. Wright, retired.

== Logo ==
The 2009 AMSA logo, combining the newer shield featuring the Rod of Asclepius and "AMSA" in text reminiscent of the older logo

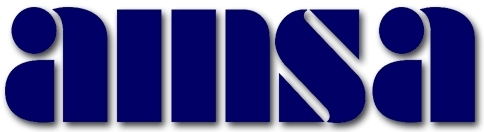
The older AMSA logo, no longer used, in effect from 1950 to 2009

To celebrate AMSA's 60th anniversary, a new logo was designed, containing a Rod of Asclepius incorporated into a shield. The letters AMSA rest upon the fully spelled out name of the organization, using the font "Today."

The crest contains four colors; from top right clockwise, they are and represent:

- Blue - (although it is not explicitly explained why the blue is in the shield, the color blue in general represents AMSA's history and tradition, since its logo has always been blue)
- Purple - Purple illustrates the advocacy efforts on behalf of LGBT medical students and those discriminated against based on gender and sexuality
- Red - Red was incorporated into the new logo to reflect the organization's dedication to fighting the global AIDS pandemic
- Green - Green exemplifies AMSA's commitment to a better environment and environmental health and the organization's commitment to reducing its carbon footprint

There is also a blazon as to the usage of the logo, including size, dimensions and colors. These can be found at AMSA's website.

== See also ==
- Caduceus as a symbol of medicine
- National Physicians Alliance
