= Doctors for America =

American nonprofit organization

- Formation: 2008
- Founder: Alice Chen; Vivek Murthy; Mandy Cohen
- Type: 501c(3)
- Headquarters: Washington, D.C.
- Location: United States
- Members: 27,000+ advocates
- Executive Director: Angie Bakke
- Website: drsforamerica.org

Doctors for America is a 501(c)(3) national, multi-specialty activist organization of physicians and medical students in the United States with a stated goal of improving affordable health care access. The organization was created by the Obama campaign, in 2008 as "Doctors for Obama" and rapidly grew to 10,000 members within a few months. It was founded by Alice Chen, Vivek Murthy, and Mandy Cohen.

The group stated that it had a membership of 15,000 and a presence in all 50 states in October 2009.

== Advocacy ==
The "four policy pillars" of the organization are expanding health insurance to all Americans; ensuring high-quality 21st-century care; expanding access to care; and improving practice environments for physicians in order to help them focus on improving patient care. The organization partnered with the American Academy of Family Physicians, the American Medical Student Association, the American College of Physicians, the American Osteopathic Association, and other organizations to promote health reform legislation in Congress to issue a July 30, 2009 open letter to all members of Congress publicly announcing their support for health reform legislation.

Beyond healthcare, Doctors for America has advocated for gun control, including an assault weapons ban. The group called gun violence a “public health epidemic.” Doctors for America has endorsed defunding the police to reallocate the money toward social workers through the People’s Response Act. The group also co-authored a report advising jails to release inmates during the pandemic.

Some commentators stated that this large coalition of doctors (the organizations collectively represented nearly 450,000) provided an important counterweight to the American Medical Association's organization's initial opposition to health reform in 2009; later AMA statements supported health reform in principle.

Doctors for America also organized a website, Voices of Physicians (www.voicesofphysicians.org), which allowed physicians to publicize their frustrations with the current health system and their recommendations for improvement, and organized house meetings of physicians across the country to talk about health reform, and interactive web talks with figures such as Jacob Hacker and Howard Dean, and participated in White House meetings on health reform.

== Leadership ==
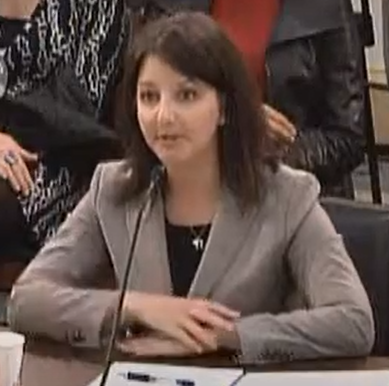
Mandy Cohen

The organization was founded by Alice Chen, Vivek Murthy, and Mandy Cohen. In 2008 Cohen was National Outreach Director for the organization. She served as the organization's policy director and later as Executive Director. On October 5, 2009, 50 of the organization's members met with President Barack Obama in the Oval Office, followed by a reception at the White House Rose Garden, for the White Coat Rally.

On 14 November 2013, the co-founder and president of Doctors for America, Dr. Vivek Murthy, was nominated by U.S. President Barack Obama to be the Surgeon General of the United States. He served as the 19th Surgeon General, and was in office from December 18, 2014 – April 21, 2017. Murthy worked on then-candidate Obama’s New England steering committee shortly before founding Doctors for Obama. In October 2022, President Joe Biden nominated Murthy to be the U.S. representative on the World Health Organization's executive board. Other senior advisors to Doctors for Obama, including Irwin Redelener and David Blumenthal, also simultaneously served as advisors to candidate Obama’s campaign.

In 2019, the National Physicians Alliance merged with Doctors for America. Doctors for America has also maintained financial partnerships with other major organizations, including the Center for American Progress and Planned Parenthood.
