= Mandy Cohen =

American internist and health official (born 1978)

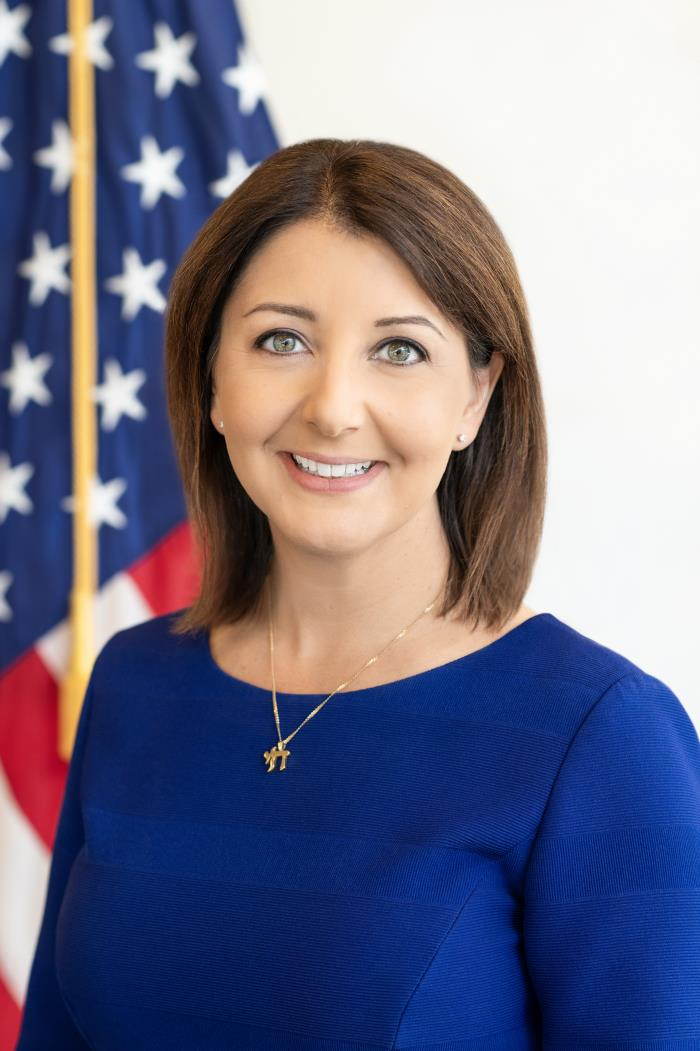
- Cohen in 2023

20th Director of the Centers for Disease Control and Prevention
- In office July 10, 2023 – January 20, 2025
- President: Joe Biden
- Deputy: Nirav D. Shah
- Preceded by: Rochelle Walensky
- Succeeded by: Susan Monarez

Secretary of the North Carolina Department of Health and Human Services
- In office January 27, 2017 – December 31, 2021
- Governor: Roy Cooper
- Preceded by: Rick Brajer
- Succeeded by: Kody Kinsley

Personal details
- Born: Mandy Krauthamer; September 17, 1978 (age 47) Baldwin, New York, U.S.
- Party: Democratic
- Spouse: Samuel Cohen
- Children: 2
- Education: Cornell University (BS); Yale University (MD); Harvard University (MPH)

Mandy Krauthamer Cohen (born September 17, 1978) is an American internist, public health official, and healthcare executive who served as the 20th director of the U.S. Centers for Disease Control and Prevention (CDC) from 2023 to 2025. She was previously the executive vice president at Aledade and chief executive officer of Aledade Care Solution, a healthcare company.

Cohen earned a bachelor's degree in policy analysis and management from Cornell University, a medical degree from the Yale School of Medicine, and a graduate degree in public health from the Harvard T.H. Chan School of Public Health. From 2017 to 2021, she served as the Health Secretary of the North Carolina Department of Health and Human Services. Before that, Cohen was the chief operating officer and chief of staff at the Centers for Medicare & Medicaid Services during the Obama Administration. She also served as the Deputy Director of Comprehensive Women's Health Services at the United States Department of Veterans Affairs, and is a founding member and former executive director of Doctors for America.

Cohen was listed as one of the Top 25 Women Leaders in Healthcare by Modern Healthcare in 2019. In 2020, she was awarded the Leadership in Public Health Practice Award by Harvard University's T.H. Chan School of Public Health, and the American Medical Association presented her with the AMA Award for Outstanding Government Service. In 2021 she was elected to the National Academy of Medicine.

== Early life and education ==
Cohen was born to Marshall and Susan Krauthamer, has two younger siblings, and is Jewish. She grew up on the south shore of Long Island in the Baldwin hamlet in Hempstead, New York. Her mother worked as a hospital nurse practitioner in emergency medicine, and inspired her to pursue a medical career. Her father was a junior high guidance counselor in the New York City school system. When she was 12 years old, she had her bat mitzvah at her family's Reform synagogue.

Cohen attended Plaza Elementary School, graduated with high honors from Baldwin Senior High School, and was awarded a Baldwin Foundation for Education scholarship in 1996. She earned a bachelor's degree in policy analysis and management from Cornell University in 2000.

She earned a medical degree from the Yale School of Medicine in 2005, and a graduate degree in public health from the Harvard T.H. Chan School of Public Health in 2004. She trained in internal medicine at Massachusetts General Hospital in Boston. While she was a medical school student in 2004, she took up a position with the American College of Physicians on their National Council of Student Members. In her residency, she served on Massachusetts General Hospital's committees for primary care, quality assurance, and recruitment. She later served as Co-Director for the Health Policy Elective at Massachusetts General Hospital, and was a northeast representative for the American College of Physicians' National Council of Associates.

== Career ==
After completing her residency in Boston, Cohen moved to Washington, D.C., where she worked for the United States Department of Veterans Affairs as the Deputy Director of Comprehensive Women's Health Services from 2008 to 2009. In 2008 she was a founding member and National Outreach Director for the grassroots organization Doctors for Obama, later renamed Doctors for America. She served as the organization's policy director and later as Executive Director.

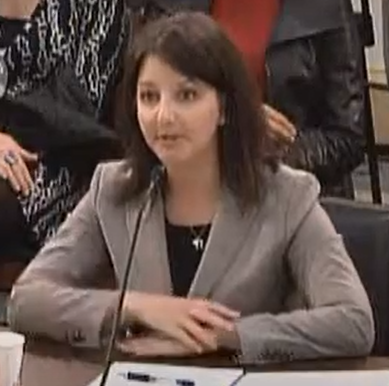
Cohen testifying before a congressional committee in 2015

In 2013 she was hired as a senior advisor by the Centers for Medicare & Medicaid Services, a federal agency within the United States Department of Health and Human Services, to assist in implementing policies for Medicaid, Medicare, and the Children's Health Insurance Program, as well as the Federally Facilitated Marketplace under the Patient Protection and Affordable Care Act. Cohen was later appointed as the chief operating officer and chief of staff services at the agency, and from 2014 to 2015 served as acting director of the agency's Center for Consumer Information and Insurance Oversight. In 2014, while eight months pregnant, Cohen advocated for maternity coverage in the Affordable Care Act before the United States Congress.

Cohen was named in the 2024 list of Time 100 Health's most influential people.

=== Secretary of North Carolina Department of Health and Human Services (2017–22) ===
In January 2017 Cohen was appointed health secretary of the North Carolina Department of Health and Human Services (NCDHHS), an organization with 17,000 employees and an annual budget of $20 billion, by Governor Roy Cooper. As secretary, she oversaw 16,000 department employees and dealt with multiple health crises in North Carolina including the Opioid epidemic, GenX in drinking water, and the COVID-19 pandemic. In 2020, Cohen was mentioned as a potential pick for United States Secretary of Health and Human Services under President-elect Joe Biden.

Cohen navigated the political divide over Medicaid in North Carolina, with Democratic governor Cooper wanting to expand it under the Affordable Care Act and the Republican-majority North Carolina General Assembly opposing such measures. She helped lead North Carolina through a transition from fee-for-service Medicaid to a model contracted by the state with private insurance companies that are paid pre-determined rates to provide health services. Cohen spearheaded Healthy Opportunities, an initiative testing the impact of providing high-need Medicaid enrollees with housing, food, transportation, and interpersonal safety interventions with the goal of improving public health and reducing costs. The initiative was funded with $650 million from state and federal Medicaid, authorized by the Centers for Medicare and Medicaid Services. She implemented the Opioid Action Plan, which uses $45.5 million in grant funding to fight opioid misuse in the state. The plan also updated the Controlled Substance Reporting System, helping doctors identify patients at risk of misusing opioids. Cohen's plan led to a decline in overdose deaths in North Carolina for the first time in over a decade. She led the Early Childhood Action Plan, focusing on improving health conditions of children from birth to age eight. In 2019 she criticized the North Carolina House of Representatives' proposed budget for 2019–21, arguing that it harmed North Carolinians by making massive cuts to the Department, potentially impacting "everything from health inspections of restaurants to the safety of drinking water to child protective services."

In February 2019 Modern Healthcare named Cohen as one of the Top 25 Women Leaders in Healthcare. She was honored with the "Top 50 in Digital Health" award by Rock Health. In September 2020, she was awarded the Leadership in Public Health Practice Award by Harvard University's T.H. Chan School of Public Health. In 2020, she was named The News & Observer's Tar Heel of the Year. In June 2021, Prevent Child Abuse North Carolina awarded her its Donna Stone Memorial Award, for making significant contributions to supporting children and families across North Carolina. In July 2021, she received the Founders Award from the NC Convention of The Delta Kappa Gamma Society. In 2021 she was also elected to the National Academy of Medicine. In March 2022 the American Medical Association (AMA) presented her with the AMA Award for Outstanding Government Service.

Governor Cooper announced on November 30, 2021, that Cohen would leave office on January 1, 2022.

During and after this time, Cohen is an adjunct professor of health policy & management at the University of North Carolina at Chapel Hill's Gillings School of Global Public Health.

==== COVID-19 pandemic ====
Cohen stressed the need for North Carolinians to wear face masks, practice social distancing, and wash their hands in order to prevent the spread of COVID-19. In March 2020 she sent a letter to the president of the 2020 Republican National Convention, asking for detailed plans on how the convention would operate during the COVID-19 pandemic after President Donald Trump published a series of tweets threatening to pull the convention out of North Carolina. In June 2020 she met virtually with members of the North Carolina House of Representatives' Health Committee to address concerns regarding the pandemic. Cohen announced the creation of up to 300 testing sites in North Carolina, active through July, and requested more supplies from the federal government. She also met with U.S. Health and Human Services Secretary Alex Azar to discuss the need for more chemical reagents. On June 30, 2020, Cohen announced that her department would partner with Omnicare, a company owned by CVS Health, to administer tests to 36,000 nursing home residents and 25,000 nursing home employees in over 400 locations.

In the beginning of July, Cohen warned of people becoming desensitized to the data being collected about COVID-19. She held a media briefing on July 16, 2020, to address virus testing in North Carolina, after the state reached 96,426 confirmed cases of COVID-19 and 1,588 deaths related to the virus. She said that she had concerns about teacher safety if schools were to re-open amidst the pandemic, but was confident in studies showing that the virus has minimal health consequences on younger children, saying that schools "have not played a significant role in the spreading of COVID-19." She met with University of North Carolina president William L. Roper to discuss how to resume in-person instruction for students at North Carolina's public colleges and universities. Earlier that month, during a press conference, she had called the virus a "serious threat". She warned of the state possibly returning to a stay-at-home order. She had also linked North Carolina's rise in cases with the reopening of the state. Cohen indicated that there would be a test surge in areas with troubling metrics, including the counties of Alamance, Durham, Duplin, Forsyth, Lee, Johnston, Mecklenburg, and Wake.

=== Private sector ===
In January 2022, Cohen became the chief executive officer of Aledade Care Solutions, a primary care enablement company founded by Farzad Mostashari, the former national coordinator for health information technology at the U.S. Department of Health and Human Services.

=== U.S. Centers for Disease Control and Prevention ===
In June 2023, President Joe Biden appointed Cohen director of the U.S. Centers for Disease Control and Prevention, succeeding Rochelle Walensky. Cohen was sworn in on July 10, 2023. In her capacity as Director of the CDC, Cohen also serves as Administrator of the Agency for Toxic Substances and Disease Registry.

== Personal life ==
Cohen is married to Samuel Cohen, a health care regulatory attorney who grew up in Philadelphia. They met in Boston, where she was finishing her residency in internal medicine and he was attending Harvard Law School. They have two daughters, and live in North Ridge Estates in northern Raleigh.

She is a member of Conservative Beth Meyer Synagogue in Raleigh. Cohen was honored by the Jewish Federation of Raleigh-Cary's Lions of Judah in 2018 for her contributions to the community.

Government offices
Preceded by Nirav D. Shah; Acting	Director of the Centers for Disease Control and Prevention; 2023–2025	Succeeded by Susan Monarez; Acting
