= Integrated Benefits Institute =

- Type: non-profit
- Industry: Healthcare
- Headquarters: 595 Market St., Suite 810, San Francisco, CA 94105
- Website: "www.ibiweb.org"

Integrated Benefits Institute (IBI) is a United States national not-for profit organization created in 1995 with more than 700 members providing modeling and measurement tools across benefits programs, research and analysis, and a discussion and education forum. IBI is an independent resource for health and productivity research, measurement and benchmarking. The Integrated Benefits Institute is supported by insurers, drug companies and employers.

== Studies ==
Examples of findings in IBI studies include:

- Employers that shift too much of the cost of drugs to workers in their company health plans could wind up losing more than they save, through absenteeism and lost productivity
- Employers severely underestimate the prevalence and lost productivity costs of depression
- The importance of addressing co-morbidities—employees with multiple chronic health conditions drive the largest effects on productivity loss
- Companies that effectively manage health-related productivity as a corporate best practice also tend to be more profitable

== Role in Health Reform ==
IBI has taken a public stance on health care reform in a September 2009 Employee Benefit Advisor article stating:

"Obama must squarely address the issue of cost control, rather than just seek to reduce the number of uninsured Americans," says Thomas Parry, president of the Integrated Benefits Institute. “The untapped opportunity in the health care debate is to link better health, health care cost reduction and improved workforce productivity. This strategy not only will deal with a fundamental root cause of health care costs, but will also link health care reform to economic recovery.” This can be done through reform provisions that encourage employers to play a greater role in preventative care. “IBI’s research shows employers know this approach is in their interest,” adds Parry, “and they can then use their leverage as payers with health insurers and providers to insist on more effective treatment and focused prevention initiatives."

IBI's research was referenced before the United States House of Representatives Committee on Energy and Commerce, Subcommittee on Health, by Richard I. Smith, Senior Vice President of Policy and Research of the Pharmaceutical Research and Manufacturers of America (PhRMA). During a hearing on prescription drug prices, Smith cited IBI's research associating increased productivity among workers with conditions like rheumatoid arthritis as an example of major therapeutic gains achieved by the industry in recent years.
