= Susan Orsega =

American rear admiral

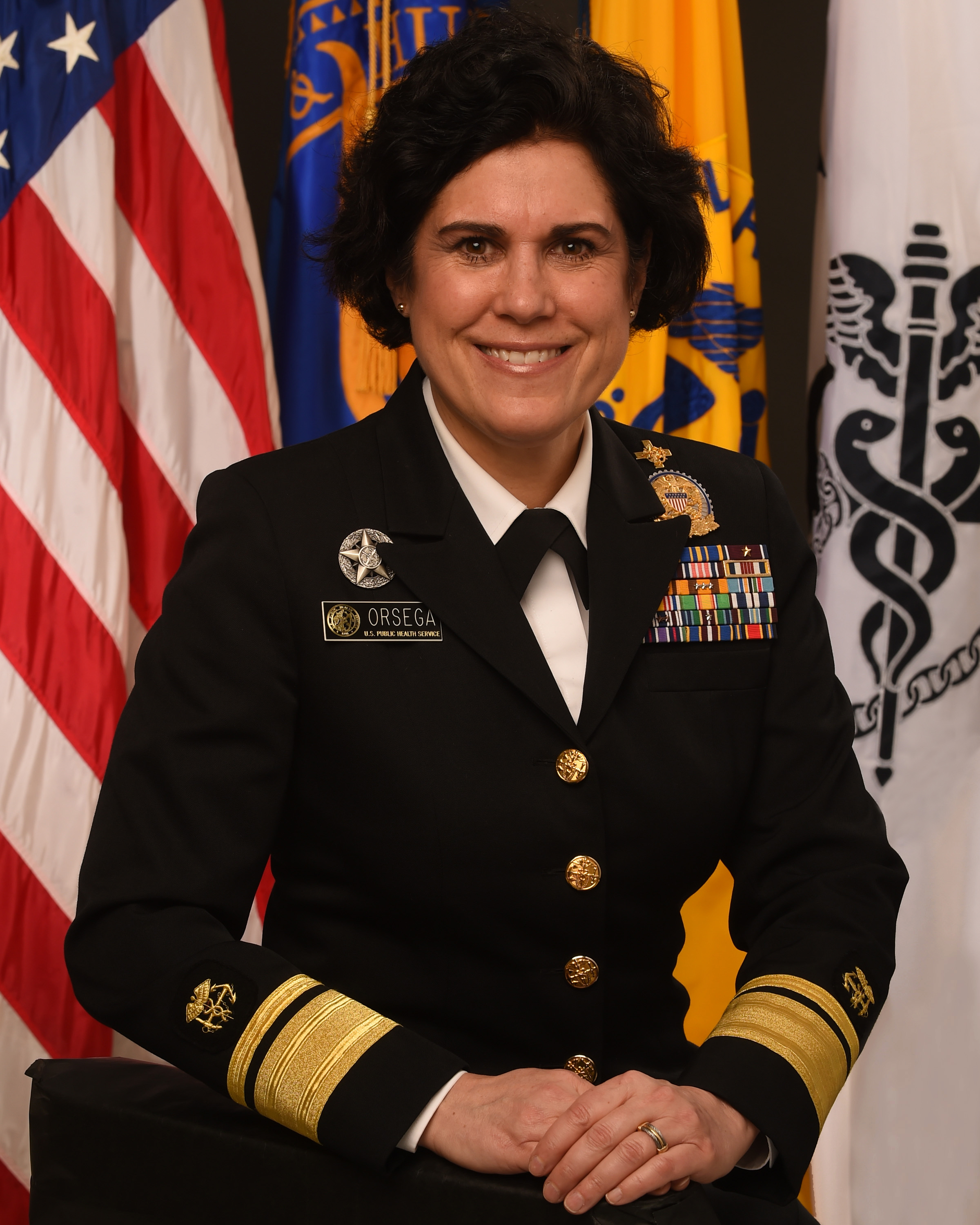
- Official portrait, 2021

Acting Surgeon General of the United States
- In office January 20, 2021 – March 24, 2021
- President: Joe Biden
- Preceded by: Jerome Adams (permanent); Erica Schwartz (acting)
- Succeeded by: Vivek Murthy

Personal details
- Education: Towson University (BS); Uniformed Services University of the Health Sciences (MS)

Military service
- Allegiance: United States
- Branch/service: United States Navy; USPHS Commissioned Corps
- Rank: Rear Admiral

Susan M. Orsega is an American nurse and retired rear admiral who currently serves as the deputy assistant secretary of Defense for Health Services Policy and Oversight within the Office of the Assistant Secretary of Defense for Health Affairs since November 2024.

== Early life and education ==
Orsega was raised in Whitehall, Allegheny County, Pennsylvania, and graduated from Baldwin High School. She matriculated at Towson University, earning a Bachelor of Science in nursing before going on to enroll in the Uniformed Services University of the Health Sciences, where she would earn a master's degree in science.

== Career ==
In 1989, Orsega began her career at the National Institutes of Health studying as a nurse practitioner concerning the subject of HIV/AIDS. Before being selected by President Joe Biden to take the position as acting Surgeon General, she worked at the National Institute of Allergy and Infectious Diseases. She previously served as the senior advisor to the Assistant Secretary for Health from March 2021 to December 2023.

Orsega was the acting surgeon general from January 20 to March 4, 2021. Orsega is one of the first nurses to serve in the position. She also previously served as the director of Commissioned Corps Headquarters, tasked with the administration of the members of the U.S. Public Health Service Commissioned Corps (USPHS), from March 2019 to October 2021. Prior to becoming acting surgeon general, Orsega was the chief nurse officer of the USPHS from 2016 until 2019.
