= Gary Greaves =

American football player (1935–2024)

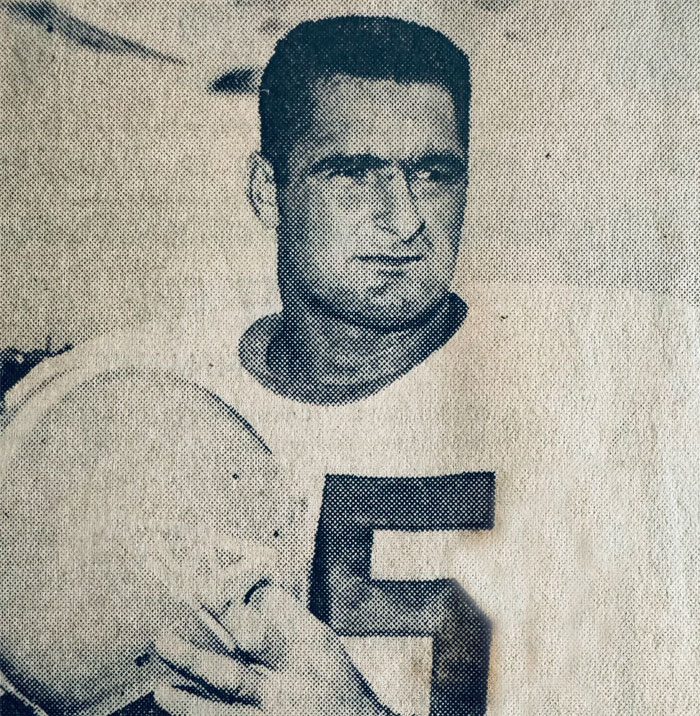

No. 65
- Position: Tackle

Personal information
- Born: October 28, 1935; Pittsburgh, Pennsylvania, U.S.
- Died: May 9, 2024 (aged 88); Melbourne, Florida, U.S.
- Listed height: 6 ft 3 in (1.91 m)
- Listed weight: 235 lb (107 kg)

Career information
- High school: Pittsburgh (PA) Baldwin
- College: Miami (FL)

Career history
- Houston Oilers (1960)

Awards and highlights
- AFL champion (1960)
- Stats at Pro Football Reference

Gary Chalfant Greaves (October 28, 1935 – May 9, 2024) was an American professional football tackle who played one season with the Houston Oilers of the American Football League (AFL). He played college football for the Miami Hurricanes.

== Early life ==
Gary Chalfant Greaves was born on October 28, 1935, in Pittsburgh, Pennsylvania. He attended Baldwin High School in Pittsburgh.

== College career ==
Greaves was a three-year starter for the Miami Hurricanes ('56 -'58) and a multi-year, All American candidate who played both offensive and defensive tackle. Up until this time, He was considered to be the most prolific defensive player in Hurricane history, breaking the school's all-time career tackling record during his Junior season. He had achieved this feat in just two years, something that took all previous record holders to achieve in three.

== Professional career ==
Greaves played offensive tackle for the AFL Houston Oilers team and was a participant in the 1960 American Football League Championship Game. He was a teammate of Pro Football Hall of Fame quarterback George Blanda. Greaves spent a single season with the Oilers, before leaving to serve in the United States Army during the Berlin Crisis. Greaves died on May 9, 2024, at the age of 88.
