= Alice Chen =

American physician

- Education: Yale University (BS); Cornell University (MD)
- Spouse: Vivek Murthy (m. 2015)
- Children: 2
- Scientific career
- Institutions: David Geffen School of Medicine at UCLA; Harvard Kennedy School

Alice Chen is an American physician who is an assistant clinical professor at the David Geffen School of Medicine at UCLA. She has previously been a Hauser Visiting Leader at Harvard Kennedy School Center for Public Leadership and assistant clinical professor position at the George Washington University in Washington, D.C. Chen was a founding member and former director of the nonprofit organization Doctors for America.

== Early life and education ==
Chen is from the San Francisco Bay Area. She studied biology at Yale University. When she arrived at Yale, Chen played violin and piano but she picked up several more extracurricular activities including Russian and Chinese calligraphy during the course of her undergraduate studies. She lived in Morse College.

Chen was a student at Yale when she first became involved with campaigning, taking part in a protest on New Haven Green to stand against land mines. She moved to the Weill Cornell Medical College of Cornell University for her medical degree, and graduated in 2005.

In the aftermath of the September 11 attacks, Chen volunteered as a caseworker for the American Red Cross. For the following six months she helped to lead the largest service center in Manhattan. Chen was an internal medicine resident at the David Geffen School of Medicine at UCLA. Here she served as director of the UCLA residency program in Malawi.

== Research and career ==
In the leadup to the 2008 United States presidential election, Chen signed an open letter from Doctors for Obama calling for reform of the United States healthcare system. After the election of Barack Obama, the doctors regrouped and renamed themselves Doctors for America. Chen became an advocate for engaging members of the academic community in policy issues.

In 2011, she became the executive of Doctors for America, and led the organisation for six years. Doctors for America is a nonprofit which mobilizes physicians and medical students to improve the health of people in the United States. In this capacity she was at the forefront of policy changes, such as the implementation of the Patient Protection and Affordable Care Act. She called for mass shootings to be treated as a public health issue.

In 2017, Chen was appointed a Hauser Leader at the Center for Public Leadership, John F. Kennedy School of Government. During her position Chen studied the epidemic of loneliness, which was thought to impact almost half of American adults, as well as the health impacts of global warming. She studied how public health policy changed in the post-Obama administration world.

During the COVID-19 pandemic, Chen called for people who were isolating to remember to set aside time every day to check-in with their friends and families, and to use their time in lockdown to find ways to help others.

In an interview with CBC News, Chen said that the social isolation "can spiral into depression or anxiety, and this can have serious ramifications on a person's physical and mental health". Writing with her husband and fellow physician, Vivek Murthy, in The Atlantic, Chen argued that the lingering damage of breaking up communities would be more difficult to measure than the effect of SARS-CoV-2 on the economy. She was appointed to Kishan Putta's COVID-19 advisory board, which looked to advise the council member on how to handle the COVID-19 pandemic.

== Personal life ==
In 2015, Chen married Vivek Murthy, Surgeon General of the United States. They have a son and a daughter.
