= Healthcare-NOW! =

U.S. single-payer healthcare advocacy group

- Formation: 2004
- Headquarters: 1534 Tremont Street, Boston, MA 02120
- Website: healthcare-now.org

Healthcare-NOW! is a non-profit grassroots coalition in support of the single-payer health care movement for the United States. Healthcare-NOW!'s stated goal is to implement the Medicare for All Act.

== History ==
Healthcare-NOW! was founded in 2004, originally under the name of the Campaign for a National Health Program NOW (CNHP NOW). The first meeting of the coalition was the Campaign for a National Health Program NOW Conference: "Health Care Crisis and Election of 2004." On August 31 and September 1, 2004, the conference was held as well as a rally during the Republican Convention.

== Funding ==
All of Healthcare-NOW funding is from individuals, unions and grassroots organizations.

== Organizing methodology ==
Healthcare-NOW! uses various community organizing methods. Strategies and ideas are developed through annual national strategy meetings with volunteer organizers and health care activists around the country, including Rep. John Conyers. In 2007, Healthcare-NOW launched traveling Road Shows promoting single payer reform, as well as co-sponsored an Annual Health Care Justice Vigil held each September in Washington D.C. Other techniques include Sicko House Parties and Truth Hearings. On June 19, 2008, Healthcare-NOW! joined efforts with other organizations, including the California Nurses Association, to initiate the National Day of Protest Against Health Insurance Companies. This National Day of Protest took place in 18 cities nationwide in support of a single payer system. It was a campaign mainly about public health care not private.

== Personnel ==
Healthcare-NOW is composed of 36 board members, in addition to the board of directors. The National Coordinator was Marilyn Clement.

Board member co-chairs

- Quentin Young, National Coordinator, Physicians for a National Health Program
- Leo Gerard, President, United Steelworkers Union
- Jim Winkler, General Secretary, General Board of Church and Society, United Methodist Church
- Rose Ann DeMoro, Executive Director of the California Nurses Association

== See also ==
- Health care reform in the United States
- List of healthcare reform advocacy groups in the United States
- Medicare (United States)
- Single-payer health care
- Medicare for All Act
- Universal health care
