= Committee of Interns and Residents =

American trade union of resident physicians

The Committee of Interns and Residents/SEIU Healthcare
- Abbreviation: CIR/SEIU Healthcare
- Formation: 1957; 69 years ago
- Type: labor union, professional organization
- Headquarters: Long Island City, Queens, New York, U.S.
- Region served: CA, DE, FL, ID, IL, MA, MN, NM, NY, NJ, PA, RI, VT, WA, Washington, D.C.
- Members: 40,000+ interns, residents and fellows
- President: Trina Van, MD
- Executive Vice President: Andrea Soto López, MD
- Secretary-Treasurer: Melissa Marseille, MD, MPH
- Affiliations: Service Employees International Union
- Website: cirseiu.org

The Committee of Interns and Residents (CIR) is the largest union of resident and fellow physicians (collectively known as "housestaff") in the United States. A local of the Service Employees International Union (SEIU), it represents more than 40,000 interns, residents, and fellows across California, Delaware, Florida, Idaho, Illinois, Massachusetts, Minnesota, New Jersey, New Mexico, New York, Pennsylvania, Rhode Island, Vermont, Washington, and Washington, D.C. CIR bargains over housestaff salaries, working hours, and working conditions, and frames much of its work around patient care and access to care in the public and safety-net hospitals where many of its members train.

Membership roughly doubled between the onset of the COVID-19 pandemic and the mid-2020s, growing from close to 18,000 residents and fellows in 2020 to more than 37,000 by early 2025 and over 40,000 by 2026, making CIR one of the fastest-growing unions in the country during that period.

== History ==
=== Founding and early decades ===
CIR was founded in 1957 by interns and residents in New York City's public hospital system. In 1958 it negotiated the first collective bargaining agreement for housestaff anywhere in the United States, which raised resident pay and addressed on-call rooms and hour limits. By the mid-1960s the union had established what it describes as the only housestaff-administered benefit plan, and from 1969 to 1970 residents in private, or "voluntary," hospitals began to organize and join.

In a landmark 1975 agreement, CIR won contractual limits capping on-call schedules at one night in three in New York City. In the late 1980s and early 1990s the union negotiated early maternity-leave provisions and pay for housestaff covering for absent colleagues, and in 1989 it helped shape New York State regulations setting maximum work-hour limits for housestaff, well before national duty-hour rules existed. Since then CIR members have negotiated hour limitations and program-security clauses at hospitals in Miami, Los Angeles, and Boston.

=== Affiliation with SEIU and the Boston Medical Center decision ===
In May 1997, CIR affiliated with the Service Employees International Union, then a two-million-member union representing more than one million healthcare workers. Two years later, in the 1999 Boston Medical Center case, the National Labor Relations Board (NLRB) held that residents at private teaching hospitals are employees with the right to unionize, a ruling that opened private-sector graduate medical education to organizing nationwide.

CIR members have historically advocated for care for the uninsured and for services such as medical interpreters, and the union lobbied for passage of the 2010 Affordable Care Act and for funding for safety-net hospitals.

== Growth during the COVID-19 era ==
The COVID-19 pandemic accelerated resident organizing sharply. CIR leaders and outside labor scholars have attributed the surge to pandemic-era working conditions colliding with longstanding grievances over pay, hours, and student debt among early-career physicians. The union won five NLRB elections in 2022, four in 2021, one in 2020, and two in 2019, then expanded far faster as the decade went on. By the 2022–2023 academic year CIR's membership had risen from about 17,000 to more than 30,000 represented physicians, and by 2025 it represented more than 37,000 residents and fellows, or roughly a fifth of all residents and fellows in the United States.

The growth attracted sustained national coverage of a wider physician-unionization wave, including in The Guardian, NPR, The Wall Street Journal, and The New York Times.

== Organizing and contract campaigns since 2021 ==
The 2021–2026 period produced the largest expansion in CIR's history, combining new union elections at major academic and safety-net hospitals with first contracts and contentious renegotiations at established chapters.

=== New York ===
Resident physicians and fellows at Montefiore Medical Center in the Bronx voted to join CIR in February 2023 by an 82% supermajority, restoring union representation that Montefiore housestaff had lacked for roughly four decades. The roughly 1,200 Montefiore residents subsequently spent more than a year bargaining a first contract, holding rallies over understaffing and what the union called the hospital's "divestment" from care in the Bronx, and filing unfair-labor-practice charges over the pace of negotiations.

In June 2024, more than 2,300 interns and residents employed by NYC Health + Hospitals reached a tentative five-and-a-half-year agreement that included a 16% wage increase and higher starting salaries, a deal the city valued at about $211 million.

=== Washington, D.C. ===
Residents at George Washington University Hospital voted to unionize with CIR in 2023, the fourth such chapter in the District of Columbia. After more than a year of bargaining, the roughly 450 GWU residents picketed in the fall of 2024 and authorized a three-day walkout in December 2024; the strike was averted hours before it was to begin when the union and the George Washington University, reached a tentative agreement. CIR also represents housestaff at Children's National Hospital in Washington, which pursued legal action against the union over a 2022 demonstration.

=== Massachusetts ===
Residents and fellows at the hospitals of Mass General Brigham voted to unionize in 2023, forming MGB Housestaff United, the union's beachhead in Boston. The win helped touch off a regional wave: in 2025, clinicians at Cambridge Health Alliance and residents and fellows at Beth Israel Deaconess Medical Center (by a 407–85 vote) also organized with CIR. By early 2026, MGB Housestaff United, representing about 2,700 physicians, was weighing a strike during first-contract bargaining before reaching agreement.

=== Pennsylvania ===
About 1,400 Penn Medicine physicians unionized with CIR in 2023, the union's first chapter in Pennsylvania, and ratified the state's first resident union contract in October 2024, winning raises, expanded paid parental leave, and other improvements. In late 2024 CIR launched a citywide campaign across nearly 3,000 residents and fellows at Children's Hospital of Philadelphia, Thomas Jefferson University Hospital, Temple University Hospital, and Einstein Healthcare Network, unionizing a reported 83% of the targeted housestaff.

=== California and the systemwide UC campaign ===
CIR expanded rapidly in California in the mid-2020s, including a tentative contract in January 2025 covering about 470 resident physicians at Kaiser Permanente in Northern California and a 2024 agreement at Kern Medical Center in Bakersfield providing incoming residents a 30% raise over three years. Beginning in 2024, residents and fellows across the University of California system merged ten separate CIR bargaining units into a single statewide unit branded "1UC," and in September 2025 the roughly 6,300 UC residents and fellows opened negotiations for the union's first systemwide UC contract, with the prior location-based agreements extended through June 30, 2026. Stanford Health Care residents, who unionized in 2022, secured raises that the union said would push starting salaries above $100,000 for incoming 2025 residents.

=== Expansion into new states ===
The campaigns of 2024–2025 brought CIR into several states for the first time. Residents and fellows at ChristianaCare in Newark, Delaware, voted 111–52 to form the first resident union in that state; residents at the University of Chicago voted to join with 98% support; and nearly 230 residents and fellows across three Care New England hospitals in Rhode Island won their elections, the second such group in that state. In January 2025 alone, CIR won six NLRB elections involving 250 or more voters each, at Thomas Jefferson University Hospital, Beth Israel Deaconess Medical Center, Rhode Island Hospital, Temple University Hospital, Einstein Healthcare Network, and ChristianaCare, and announced a supermajority vote among nearly 1,000 residents and fellows at the University of Minnesota. In August 2024, about 700 residents and fellows at the University of New Mexico negotiated a 5% raise as an amendment to their existing CIR contract.

=== Strikes ===
CIR strikes are rare; the union notes that most of its contracts contain no-strike clauses and that work stoppages must be authorized by a member vote. In practice, much of the union's leverage during the 2020s came from strike authorizations and last-minute settlements rather than walkouts, as at George Washington in December 2024 and at Mount Sinai Morningside and Mount Sinai West in 2023, where a ten-day strike notice preceded a negotiated agreement.

== Advocacy and litigation ==
CIR has paired collective bargaining with political and legal advocacy on issues affecting housestaff, including immigration. In October 2025 the union joined Global Nurse Force v. Trump, a lawsuit filed in the United States District Court for the Northern District of California challenging a September 2025 presidential proclamation that imposed a $100,000 fee on new H-1B petitions; many resident physicians are employed on H-1B visas. CIR was a named plaintiff alongside the United Automobile Workers, the American Association of University Professors, and other organizations, represented by Democracy Forward and the Justice Action Center. The court heard arguments on the plaintiffs' motion for emergency relief in February 2026; related challenges by the U.S. Chamber of Commerce and a coalition of 20 states proceeded separately.

== Leadership ==
CIR is governed by a member-elected executive committee. As of the 2026–2028 term, the principal officers are President Trina Van, MD (Children's National Medical Center); Executive Vice President Andrea Soto López, MD (Los Angeles General); and Secretary-Treasurer Melissa Marseille, MD, MPH (Brooklyn Hospital Center), supported by regional vice presidents from the union's Eastern, Central, and Western regions. A. Taylor Walker, MD served as president during the 2024–2026 term, a period of record membership growth.

Presidents of CIR
Term	President
2026–present	Trina Van, MD
2024–2026	A. Taylor Walker, MD
2022–2024	Lorenzo Antonio González, MD
2021–2022	Darshan Patel, MD
2020–2021	Keriann Shalvoy, MD
2018–2020	Jessica Edwards, DO
2016–2018	Eve Kellner, DO
2010–2011	Farbod Raiszadeh, MD, PhD
2007–2010	Luella Toni Lewis, MD
1970–1972	Fitzhugh Mullan, MD
1957–1958	Herbert Vaughan, MD

Abbreviated; a full list of CIR presidents from 1957 appears on the union's history page.

== Organization ==
CIR is a local union of SEIU with its national office in Long Island City, Queens. It represents housestaff at more than 60 hospitals and health systems and reports that its members make up a substantial share of resident staff at the institutions where it bargains. As a labor organization, CIR files annual financial disclosure (LM-2) reports with the U.S. Department of Labor's Office of Labor-Management Standards, which detail its receipts, disbursements, and officer and staff compensation.

== See also ==
- Service Employees International Union
- Doctors Council SEIU
- Resident (medicine)
- Graduate medical education
- Healthcare reform in the United States
