= Medicare for All Act =

Proposed U.S. healthcare reform legislation

- Long title: To establish an improved Medicare for All national health insurance program.
- Announced in: the 117th United States Congress
- Number of co-sponsors: 136

Legislative history
- Introduced in the House of Representatives as H.R. 1976 by Pramila Jayapal (D–WA) on March 17, 2021

The Medicare for All Act (abbreviated M4A), also known as the Expanded and Improved Medicare for All Act or United States National Health Care Act, is a bill first introduced in the United States House of Representatives by Representative John Conyers (D-MI) in 2003, with 38 co-sponsors. Conyers reintroduced the bill every year until he resigned in 2017, always as HR 676. In 2019, the original proposal was renumbered, and Pramila Jayapal (D-WA) introduced a new, broadly similar, but more detailed, version of the bill, then HR 1384 in the 116th Congress. Most recently, Jayapal reintroduced the bill in the 119th Congress. As of November 11, 2026, it has 118 co-sponsors in the House, or 55.1% of House Democrats.

The act would establish a universal single-payer national health insurance system in the United States, the rough equivalent of Canada's Medicare and Taiwan's Bureau of National Health Insurance, among other examples. Under a single-payer system, most medical care would be paid for by the federal government, ending the need for private health insurance and premiums, and re-casting private insurance companies as providing purely supplemental coverage, to be used when non-essential care is sought. The national system would be paid for in part through taxes replacing insurance premiums, but also by savings realized through the provision of preventive universal health care and the elimination of insurance company overhead and hospital billing costs.

On September 13, 2017, Senator Bernie Sanders (I-VT) introduced a parallel bill in the United States Senate, which he has continued to reintroduce every year since. The act would similarly establish a universal single-payer health care system in the United States. As of November 11, 2026, it has 18 cosponsors, or 38.3% of Senate Democrats.

== Provisions ==
The laws proposed are not necessarily identical year-over-year.

=== John Conyers' bill ===
The summary of the National Health Care Act as proposed in the 111th Congress (2009–2010) includes the following elements, among others:

1. Expands the Medicare program to provide all individuals residing in the 50 states, Washington, D.C., and territories of the United States with tax-funded health care that includes all medically necessary care. That would include primary and preventive care, prescription drugs, emergency care, long-term care, mental health services, dental services, and vision care.
2. Prohibits an institution from participating unless it is a public or nonprofit institution. Allows nonprofit health maintenance organizations (HMOs) that deliver care in their own facilities to participate. On the whole, private insurance would be replaced with the new nationalized system for all basic, major care.
3. Gives patients the freedom to choose from participating physicians and institutions, which, given the coverage of the new national system, would be any institution or clinic in the United States receiving any degree of public funding (the vast majority).
4. Prohibits a private health insurer from selling health insurance coverage that duplicates the benefits provided under this Act. Allows the private insurers to sell benefits not medically necessary, such as cosmetic surgery benefits.
5. Sets forth methods to pay institutional providers of care and health professionals for services. Prohibits financial incentives between HMOs and physicians based on utilization.
6. Establishes the USNHC Trust Fund to finance the Program with amounts deposited: (1) from existing sources of government revenues for health care; (2) by increasing personal income taxes on the top 5% of income earners; (3) by instituting a progressive excise tax on payroll and self-employment income; and (4) by instituting a small tax on stock and bond transactions. Transfers and appropriates amounts that would have been appropriated for federal public health care programs, including Medicare, Medicaid, and the State Children's Health Insurance Program. Taxes would be paid instead of insurance premiums, as the government (instead of private insurance companies) would be paying for the care under the single-payer health care system.
7. Establishes a program to assist individuals whose jobs are eliminated (such as those within insurance companies) by the simplified single-payer administrative process.
8. Requires creation of a confidential electronic patient record system.
9. Establishes a National Board of Universal Quality and Access to provide advice on quality, access, and affordability.
10. Provides for the eventual integration of the Indian Health Service into the program and evaluation of the continued independence of Department of Veterans Affairs (VA) health programs.
11. The bill covers treatments starting on the first day of the year that follows one year after the date of passage.
12. Compensation continues for 15 years to owners of converting for-profit providers for reasonable financial losses.

=== Pramila Jayapal's bill ===
Pramila Jayapal's Medicare for All Act of 2019, introduced in the House, is broadly similar but more detailed than the original Conyers proposal, but the "parallel" proposal introduced in the Senate by Bernie Sanders has significant differences, including a "global budget" system for hospitals. Both proposals contain expansive coverage including long-term care and dental care with no cost-sharing such as coinsurance, deductibles, or premiums, which as of 2019 is unprecedented in the world.

Under the House version, funding for institutions such as hospitals would be negotiated with regional directors, while individual providers would be paid on a fee-for-service basis. Value-based pay-for-performance incentives would not be allowed. The Department of Health and Human Services (HHS) would have administrative authority to set various details.

The Senate proposal sets out a four-year transition plan; the House proposal is two years.

As of April 2019, the Senate proposal did not include details on how to completely pay for the plan, but Sanders had released a paper listing ideas.

Dean Phillips, the Democratic congressman who challenged Joe Biden for the Party's nomination for President in 2024, endorsed Pramila Jayapal's “Medicare for All” legislation during his campaign.

== Legislative history ==
As of 22 June 2026:

Congress	Short title	Bill number(s)	Date introduced	Sponsor(s)	# of cosponsors	Latest status
108th Congress	Expanded and Improved Medicare for All Act of 2003	H.R. 676	February 12, 2003	John Conyers (D-MI)	38	Died in Committee
109th Congress	Expanded and Improved Medicare for All Act of 2005	H.R. 676	February 8, 2005	John Conyers (D-MI)	78	Died in Committee
110th Congress	United States National Health Insurance Act (or the Expanded and Improved Medicare for All Act) of 2007	H.R. 676	January 24, 2007	John Conyers (D-MI)	93	Died in Committee
111th Congress	Expanded and Improved Medicare for All Act of 2009	H.R. 676	January 26, 2009	John Conyers (D-MI)	87	Died in Committee
112th Congress	Expanded and Improved Medicare for All Act of 2011	H.R. 676	February 11, 2011	John Conyers (D-MI)	77	Died in Committee
113th Congress	Expanded and Improved Medicare for All Act of 2013	H.R. 676	February 13, 2013	John Conyers (D-MI)	63	Died in Committee
114th Congress	Expanded and Improved Medicare for All Act of 2015	H.R. 676	February 3, 2015	John Conyers (D-MI)	62	Died in Committee
115th Congress	Expanded and Improved Medicare for All Act of 2017	H.R. 676	January 24, 2017	John Conyers (D-MI)	124	Died in Committee
115th Congress	Expanded and Improved Medicare for All Act of 2017	S. 1804	September 13, 2017	Bernie Sanders (I-VT)	16	Died in Committee
116th Congress	Medicare for All Act of 2019	H.R. 1384	February 27, 2019	Pramila Jayapal (D-WA)	118	Died in Committee
116th Congress	Medicare for All Act of 2019	S. 1129	April 10, 2019	Bernie Sanders (I-VT)	14	Died in Committee
117th Congress	Medicare for All Act of 2021	H.R. 1976	March 17, 2021	Pramila Jayapal (D-WA)	122	Died in Committee
117th Congress	Medicare for All Act of 2022	S. 4204	May 12, 2022	Bernie Sanders (I-VT)	14	Died in Committee
118th Congress	Medicare for All Act of 2023	H.R. 3421	May 17, 2023	Pramila Jayapal (D-WA)	113	Died in Committee
118th Congress	Medicare for All Act of 2023	S.1655	May 17, 2023	Bernie Sanders (I-VT)	14	Died in Committee
119th Congress	Medicare for All Act of 2025	H.R. 3069	April 29, 2025	Pramila Jayapal (D-WA)	114	Referred to Committees of Jurisdiction
119th Congress	Medicare for All Act of 2025	S. 1506	April 29, 2025	Bernie Sanders (I-VT)	17	Referred to Committees of Jurisdiction

== Analysis ==
An analysis of the bill by Physicians for a National Health Program estimated the immediate savings at $350 billion per year. Others have estimated a long-term savings amounting to 40% of all national health expenditures due to the extended preventive healthcare and the elimination of insurance company overhead costs.

A study estimated the 1999 costs of U.S. health care administration at nearly $300 billion, accounting for 30.1% of health care expenses, versus 16.7% in Canada. This study estimated the U.S. per-person administrative cost at $1,059.

Charles Blahouse, who worked as George W. Bush's economic advisor and as a public trustee for Medicare and social security, wrote a Mercatus Center study of the 2017 proposal. It claims that Sanders' M4A plan will increase federal spending by at least $3.2 trillion (this money is currently going to private healthcare) but that the savings on administrative and other costs could save $2 trillion in healthcare costs. However, Blahouse stresses that these savings rely on multiple generous assumptions and that the plan will likely cost significantly more.

A 2019 analysis was critical of Sanders' bill for allowing accountable care organizations and failing to include a provision to negotiate budgets with hospitals.

According to a 2020 study in The Lancet, the Medicare for All Act was estimated to save 13% in national health-care expenditure (equivalent to more than US$450 billion annually), and save more than 68,500 lives every year.

== See also ==
- Health care reform
- Health care reform in the United States
- Healthcare-NOW!
- Healthy Americans Act
- Healthcare rationing in the United States
- Medicare (United States)
- Public health insurance option

=== Other countries ===
- Comparison of the healthcare systems in Canada and the United States
- Health care systems by country
- Health system § International comparisons
