= Presidential transition of Joe Biden =

Transfer of presidential power from Donald Trump to Joe Biden

- President Donald Trump (left) and President-elect Joe Biden (right).
- Election date: November 3, 2020
- Transition start: November 7, 2020
- Inauguration date: January 20, 2021
- President-elect: Joe Biden (Democrat)
- Vice president-elect: Kamala Harris (Democrat)
- Outgoing president: Donald Trump (Republican)
- Outgoing vice president: Mike Pence (Republican)
- Headquarters: 1401 Constitution Ave NW; Washington, D.C., U.S.
- Co-chairs: Anita Dunn (since September 5, 2020); Ted Kaufman (since June 20, 2020); Michelle Lujan Grisham (since September 5, 2020); Cedric Richmond (since September 5, 2020); Jeffrey Zients (since September 5, 2020)
- Website: Build Back Better Archived 2021-01-20 at the Wayback Machine

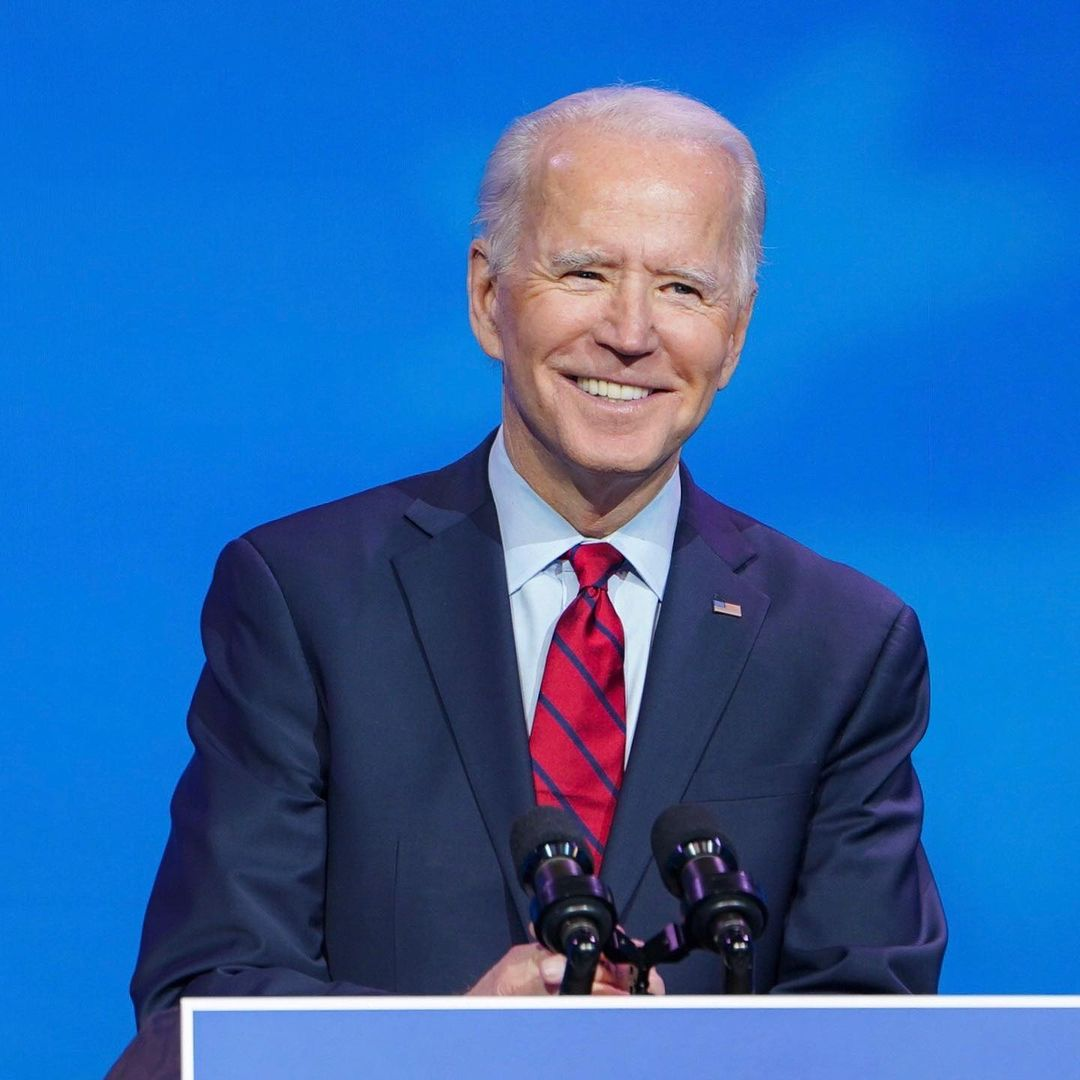
Biden giving a speech as President-elect.

The presidential transition of Joe Biden began on November 7, 2020, and ended on January 20, 2021. Biden had become president-elect once the election results became clear on November 7, 2020, four days after the election. Unlike previous presidential transitions, which normally take place during the roughly 10-week period between the election in the first week of November and the inauguration on January 20, Biden's presidential transition was shortened because the General Services Administration under the outgoing first Trump administration did not recognize Biden as the "apparent winner" until November 23.

Biden became the presumptive nominee of the Democratic Party for president in April 2020, and formally accepted the nomination the following August. Biden's transition team, led by Ted Kaufman, had already been announced on June 20. Further co-chairs joined the team alongside Kaufman in September. The 2020 presidential election took place on November 3. That evening, incumbent president Donald Trump declared himself the winner, based on his initial lead in tabulated in-person votes — a situation which was widely anticipated and quickly discredited as meaningless, since the votes counted at the time were not representative of the final total and it takes several days to count all the votes. Trump continued to falsely insist that he had won, alleging without evidence that Biden's increasing lead was due to widespread fraud, corruption, and other misconduct. He challenged the results in multiple lawsuits in multiple states, none of which resulted in a substantive victory. Because of Trump's denials, there was a several-week delay before his administration began even limited cooperation with the Biden team.

After three and a half days of vote counting, on November 7, at approximately 11:30 a.m. EST, the Associated Press, along with major TV networks including CNN, ABC News, CBS News, NBC News, and Fox News, called the race for Joe Biden. After that, most sources described him as the president-elect. Nonetheless, GSA administrator Emily Murphy, a Trump appointee, waited until November 23 to issue the "ascertainment" letter declaring Biden the "apparent winner" on the basis that Trump still disputed the election result. The declaration marked the official start of the transition, and withholding it from the Biden team had denied them $6.3 million, office space, government website status, and access to agencies. Separately, Biden was denied daily classified national security briefings until the Trump administration approved Biden's receiving such briefings on November 24.

The Electoral College met on December 14, 2020, to formally elect Biden and Kamala Harris respectively, as president and vice president. The results were to be counted by a joint session of Congress on January 6, 2021, but due to an attempt by Trump supporters to overturn the results by storming and vandalizing the Capitol building, the electoral count was not completed until January 7. Biden's transition ended when he was inaugurated on January 20, 2021, at which point his presidency began.

== Background issues ==
=== Preparations for potential disputed election ===
As early as the summer of 2020, President Donald Trump began questioning the legitimacy of the 2020 election, saying that the increase of mail-in voting in the election compared to previous elections will lead to a "rigged election". For this reason, many pundits and editorial writers would insist that Biden would need to win by a landslide to prevent Trump from challenging the result. Trump's preemptive accusations of fraud led some people to consider what would happen if he should lose by a margin less than a landslide. At various points, Trump had called for his attorney general, William Barr, to investigate Biden and his son Hunter, with Trump frequently insisting that his opponent should be in prison.

Rosa Brooks, who worked in the Department of Defense during the Obama administration, co-founded the Transition Integrity Project (TIP), which in June 2020 ran a series of "wargaming" exercises to explore potential election and transition scenarios. In August 2020, TIP released a widely discussed report that outlined four 2020 election crisis scenario planning exercises for the 2020 United States presidential election. The scenarios examined by TIP included a decisive Biden win, a decisive Trump win, a narrow Biden win, and a period of extended uncertainty after the election. Other academics, such as Lawrence Douglas in his book Will He Go?: Trump and the Looming Election Meltdown in 2020, have also discussed the possibility, which later turned out to be true, of Trump refusing to concede if he lost.

Per the 20th Amendment, the vice president must count the electoral votes in front of Congress's joint session on January 6, 2021. This is governed by the Electoral Count Act of 1887, passed to prevent crises such as that in 1876–77, and while provisions have been used, the act has never been truly put to the test. The Biden legal team had prepared for this, drafting basic responses to each of the possible litigations gamed out by the TIP and others. The only one of the more than sixty cases which had not been dismissed out of hand was about late-arriving mail-in ballots.

=== Delays in initiating the transition ===
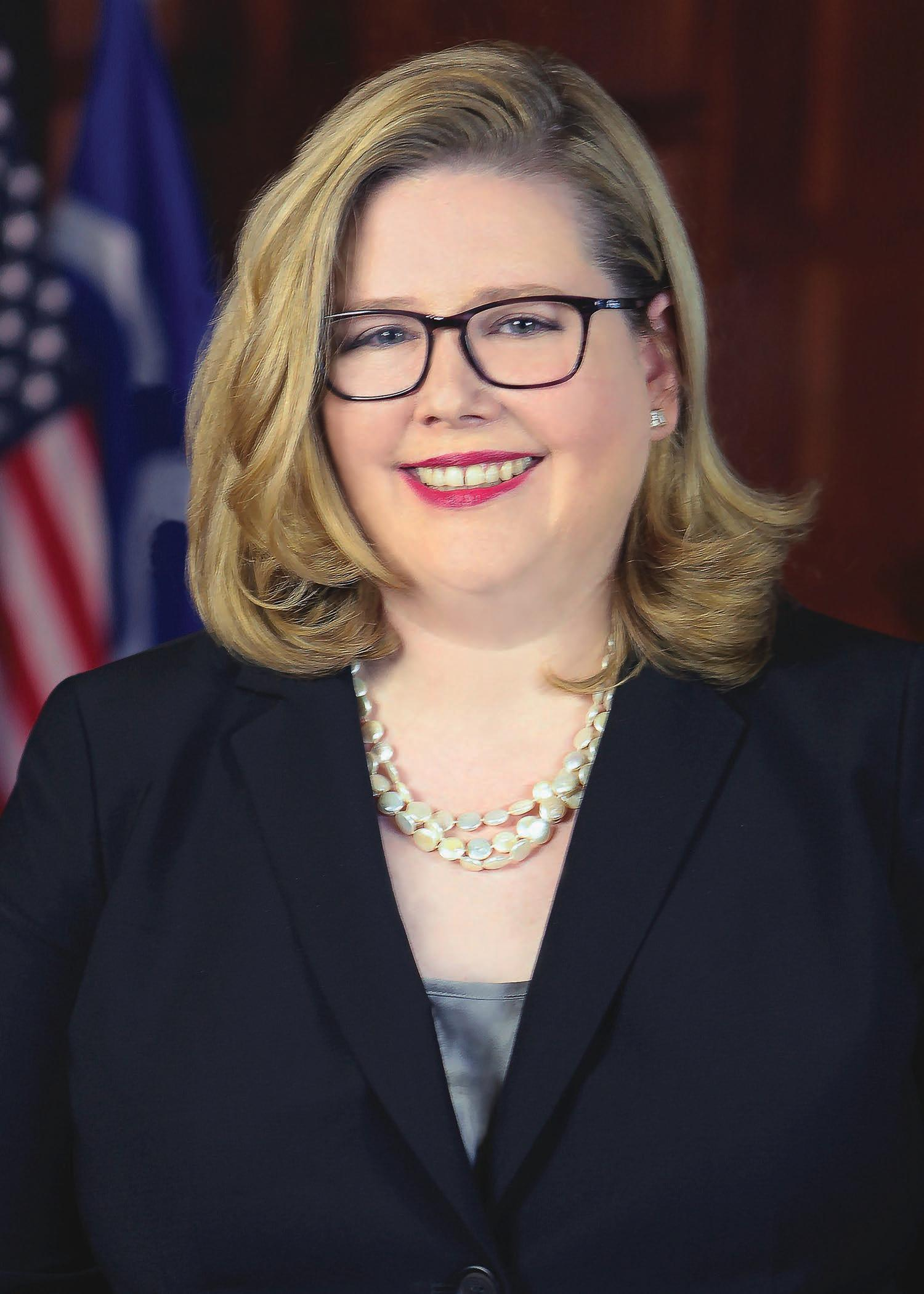
Administrator of General Services Emily Murphy withheld transition resources until November 23.

Though Joe Biden was generally acknowledged as president-elect in the election on November 7, 2020, General Services Administration head Emily Murphy refused to initiate the transition to the president-elect, thereby denying funds and office space to his team.

Murphy refused to sign a letter (the "ascertainment" determination) allowing Biden's transition team to formally begin work to facilitate an orderly transition of power. By refusing to allow the Biden administration transition to proceed, she prevented the incoming administration from obtaining office space, performing background checks on prospective Cabinet nominees, and accessing classified information which might be needed to respond to emergencies that the administration confronts when in office. Murphy's withholding of the letter also blocked President-elect Biden's transition team from accessing several million dollars in federal transition funds for salaries and other costs, establishing government email addresses, and working with the Office of Government Ethics on required financial disclosure and conflict-of-interest forms for incoming nominees. Amid public speculation that her refusal might jeopardize national security and public health, Murphy began a job search for herself, inquiring about employment opportunities in 2021.

On November 8, the nonpartisan Center for Presidential Transition issued a statement saying "We urge the Trump administration to immediately begin the post-election transition process and the Biden team to take full advantage of the resources available under the Presidential Transition Act." The letter was signed by several experts in presidential transitions: Joshua Bolten, President George W. Bush's former chief of staff; Mike Leavitt, former governor of Utah and Bush's Secretary of Health and Human Services; Mack McLarty, Bill Clinton's former chief of staff; and Penny Pritzker, Barack Obama's Secretary of Commerce.

Andrew Card, the first White House chief of staff under George W. Bush, expressed concern about the delay, noting that "the 9/11 Commission had said if there had been a longer transition [in 2000] and there had been cooperation, there might have been a better response, or maybe not even any attack". Four former Secretaries of Homeland Security, Tom Ridge, Michael Chertoff, Janet Napolitano, and Jeh Johnson, called upon Murphy to initiate the transition, writing in a joint statement: "Our country is in the middle of twin crises: a global pandemic and a severe economic downturn. The pandemic will make any transition more complicated. At this period of heightened risk for our nation, we do not have a single day to spare to begin the transition. For the good of the nation, we must start now."

Anthony Fauci, the government's leading infectious disease expert, warned the delay was "obviously not good" from a public health perspective, while President-elect Biden argued "more people may die" as a result of the delay.

On November 23, after Michigan certified its results, Murphy issued the letter of ascertainment, granting the Biden transition team access to federal funds and resources for an orderly transition. Breaking with recent precedent, the letter did not call Biden "president-elect", instead fulfilling her requirements under the Act without implying that he won the election. In the letter Murphy called the Act "vague", recommended Congress "consider amendments to the Act" to improve the standard it sets for post-election allocation of resources, and described threats she had allegedly received pressuring her to act.

== Timeline ==
=== Pre-election ===
Meetings between the transition team and the administration began with the formation of two councils in May 2020, around the time the former vice president had clinched the Democratic nomination.

- April 8, 2020: Biden becomes the presumptive nominee after Bernie Sanders withdraws.
- June 20, 2020: Initial transition team announced.
- August 2020: Biden and California Senator Kamala Harris are nominated at the Democratic Convention.
- September 5, 2020: Full transition team is made public.
- November 1, 2020: Deadline for transition materials to be completed.
- November 3, 2020: Election Day

=== Post-election ===
- November 4: The transition website, buildbackbetter.com, goes live.
- November 7: Election is called for Biden.
- November 8: GSA Administrator Emily Murphy refuses to sign a letter declaring the official start of the transition, denying funds and office space to the Biden team.
- November 10: Transition Co-chair Ted Kaufman announces full transition team of at least 500 people.
- November 23: Emily Murphy signs the transition letter. The transition website changed its web address from buildbackbetter.com to buildbackbetter.gov
- December 9: Election results in every state and D.C. are certified.
- December 11: Supreme Court rejects Texas v. Pennsylvania challenge, mooting all others.
- December 14: The Electoral College formally elects Biden as president and Harris as vice president.
- December 18: The Acting Secretary of Defense surprises the Biden transition team with a "mutually agreed to" suspension of contacts until January.
- January 6, 2021: Congress counts Electoral College votes; interrupted by the January 6 United States Capitol attack.
- January 7, 2021: Congress completes counting Electoral College votes and officially confirms the election results.
- January 13, 2021: President Trump is impeached for the second time.
- January 20, 2021: Inauguration Day

== Transition procedures ==
In accordance with the Pre-Election Presidential Transition Act of 2010, potential presidential transition teams are provided office space by the General Services Administration (GSA). They are also eligible for government funding for staff; spending on Mitt Romney's transition team in 2012 was $8.9 million, all funds appropriated by the U.S. government. In order for the Biden transition team to formally begin working with federal agencies, access federal transition funds, and utilize government-provided office space, Biden had to be formally certified as president-elect by the administrator of the General Services Administration. After the media projected Biden to win the election, and as Trump refused to concede, the current GSA administrator, Trump appointee Emily W. Murphy, refused to sign a letter of authorization. She argued that she had seen no certification outside of the media that Biden has won, and was under no obligation to treat Biden as president-elect.

Key responsibilities of a presidential transition include the identification and vetting of candidates for approximately 4,000 non-civil service positions in the U.S. government who serve at the pleasure of the president; arranging the occupancy of executive residences including the White House, One Observatory Circle, and Camp David; liaising with the United States Strategic Command for receipt of the Gold Codes; and briefing senior personnel about a new administration's policy priorities.

Under existing federal law and custom, Biden became eligible to receive classified national security briefings when his nomination was formalized at the party's national convention in August 2020.

The Presidential Transition Act was amended in 2019 to require the incumbent president to establish "transition councils" by June of an election year to facilitate a possible handover of power.

== Transition activities ==
=== Establishment of the transition team ===
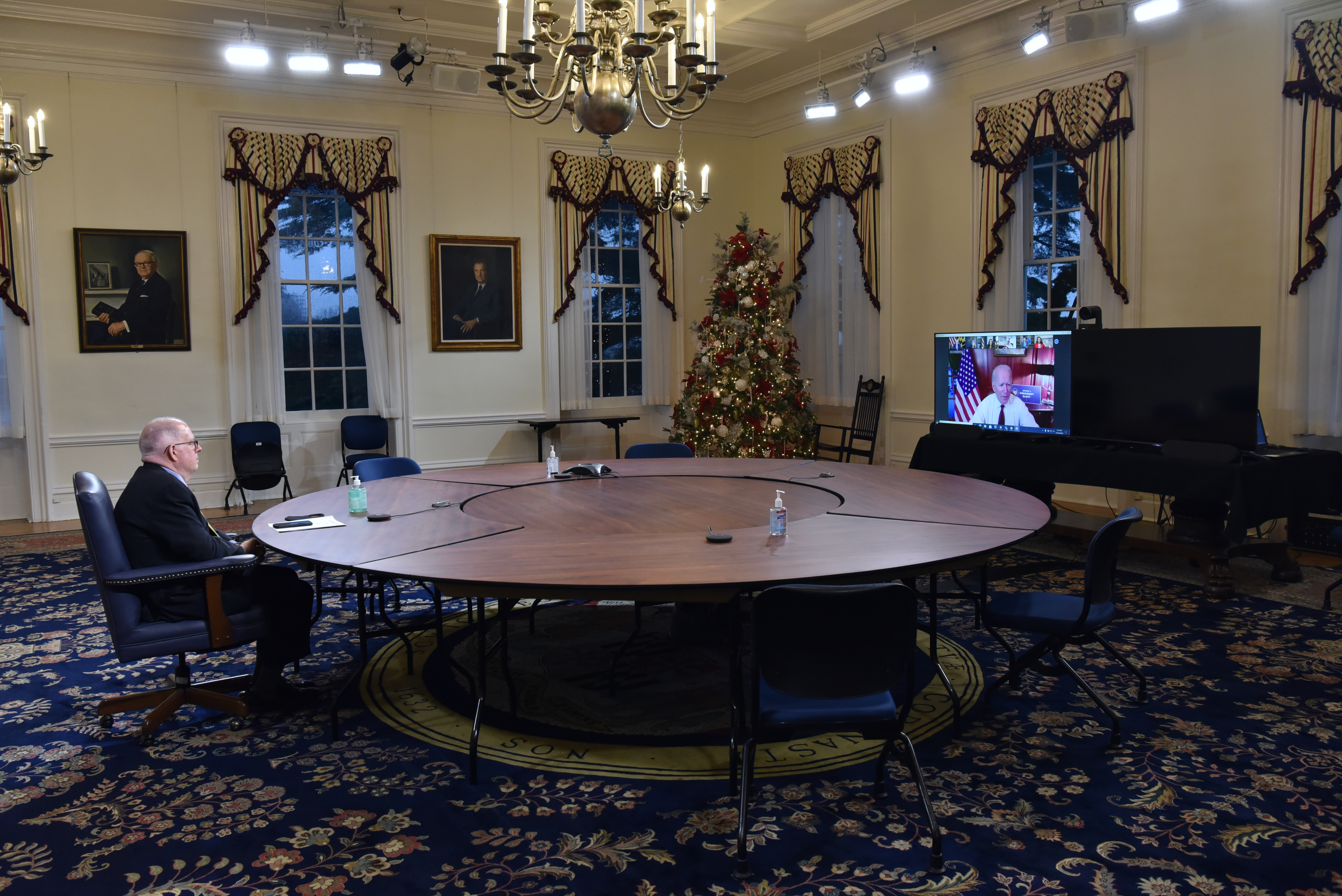
Governor of Maryland Larry Hogan participates in a virtual meeting with Biden, Harris, and other governors on December 16

Biden began to appoint transition staff in May 2020, chaired by Ted Kaufman. Kaufman was previously appointed to Biden's senate seat following his resignation to become the Vice President. Further staff were announced in September. The campaign had an estimated budget of $7–10 million and planned to have a staff of 300 people by early December 2020. Several working groups were set up in late September and early October. Due to the COVID-19 pandemic, much of the work was done over Zoom.

Biden launched his transition website at approximately 6:30 p.m. EST on November 4, a day after Election Day and before the final election results were in.

=== Harris Senate transition ===
Harris resigned her Senate seat on January 18, 2021, two days before assuming the vice presidency. On January 19, 2021, California Governor Gavin Newsom announced that California Secretary of State Alex Padilla succeeded Harris for the remainder of her term.

=== Litigation ===
While the transition was ongoing, multiple lawsuits were filed to contest election procedures and results. Most of these lawsuits were unsuccessful and were quickly dismissed.

=== COVID-19 Advisory Board ===
Before naming any White House staff or cabinet appointments, Biden announced that he will appoint a COVID-19 task force, co-chaired by former Surgeon General Vivek Murthy, former Food and Drug Administration Commissioner David Kessler and Yale University epidemiologist Professor Marcella Nunez-Smith, to replace the previous White House Coronavirus Task Force.

Biden pledged a larger federal government response to the pandemic than Donald Trump, akin to President Franklin D. Roosevelt's New Deal following the Great Depression. This would include increased testing for the COVID virus, a steady supply of personal protective equipment, distributing a vaccine and securing money from Congress for schools and hospitals under the aegis of a national "supply chain commander" who would coordinate the logistics of manufacturing and distributing protective gear and test kits. This would be distributed by a "Pandemic Testing Board", also similar to Roosevelt's War Production Board.

Biden also pledged to invoke the Defense Production Act more aggressively than Trump in order to build up supplies, as well as the mobilization of up to 100,000 Americans for a "public health jobs corps" of contact tracers to help track and prevent outbreaks. "Other members are Dr. Luciana Borio, Rick Bright, Dr. Ezekiel Emanuel, Dr. Atul Gawande, Dr. Celine Gounder, Dr. Julie Morita, Michael Osterholm, Loyce Pace, Dr. Robert Rodriguez and Dr. Eric Goosby." Anthony Fauci confirmed on November 25 that he expected to begin working with the Biden transition team soon.

=== Cabinet and White House appointments ===
On November 11, Biden announced his choice of Ron Klain, formerly his chief of staff during his vice presidency, to serve as White House chief of staff. On November 17, Mike Donilon was named Senior Advisor to the President, Jen O'Malley Dillon was named deputy chief of staff, Steve Ricchetti was named Counselor to the President, Cedric Richmond was named Senior Advisor to the President of the United States and director of the White House Office of Public Engagement, and Dana Remus was named Counsel to the President. Annie Tomasini was named the Oval Office Operations Director. On November 20, 2020, Biden named Louisa Terrell director of the Office of Legislative Affairs, Carlos Elizondo White House Social Secretary, Catherine M. Russell director of the White House Presidential Personnel Office, and Mala Adiga policy director to the First Lady.

On November 22, 2020, Bloomberg News and the New York Times reported that Biden had selected Tony Blinken as his nominee for secretary of state. The next day, Biden announced that he would nominate Alejandro Mayorkas to be Secretary of Homeland Security, Avril Haines to be the Director of National Intelligence, and Linda Thomas-Greenfield as United States Ambassador to the United Nations, Jake Sullivan to be National Security Advisor, and John Kerry as special presidential envoy on climate. It was also reported that Biden will nominate former Chair of the Federal Reserve Janet Yellen to be Treasury Secretary.

==== White House Staff ====
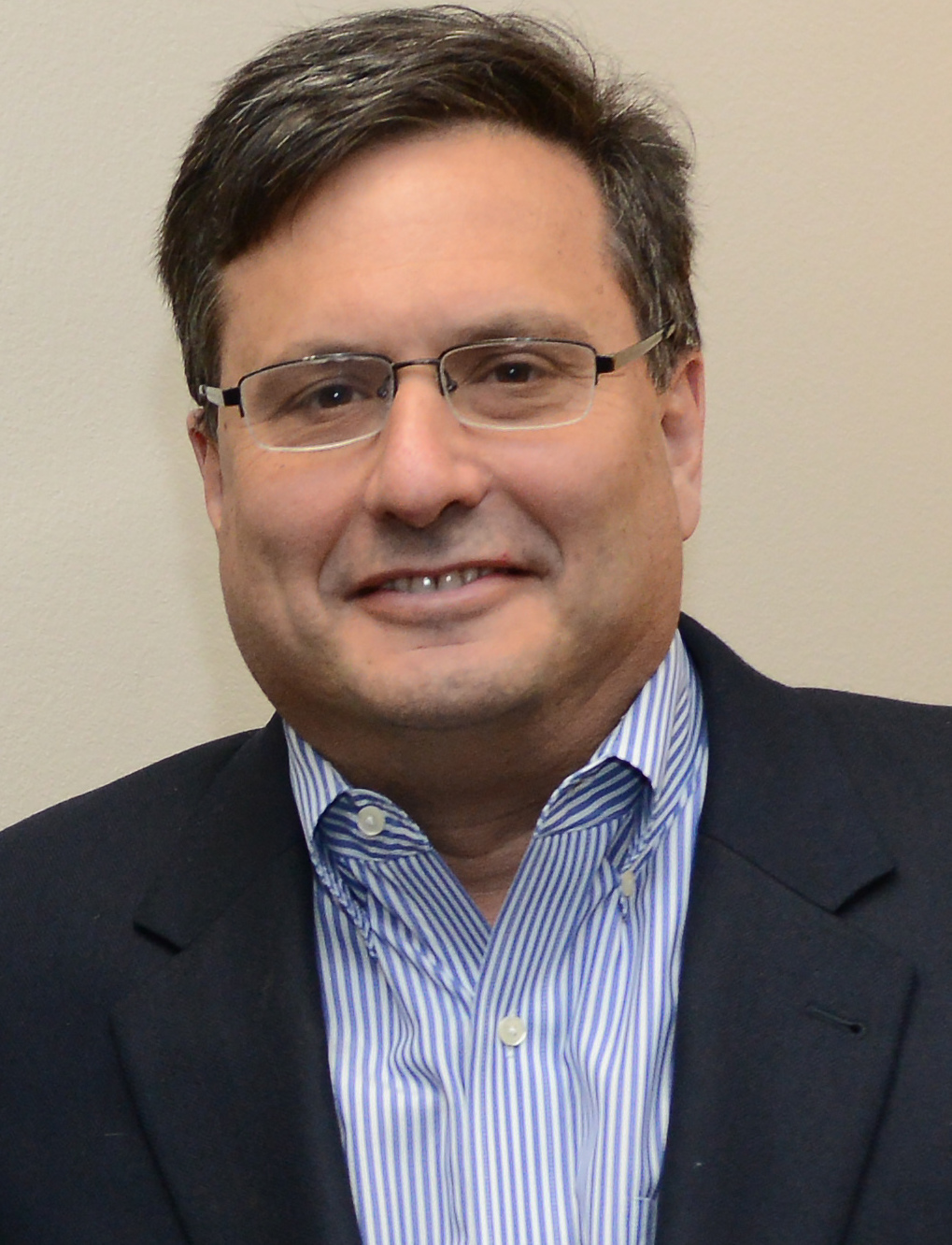
Ron Klain
White House Chief of Staff
(announced November 11)

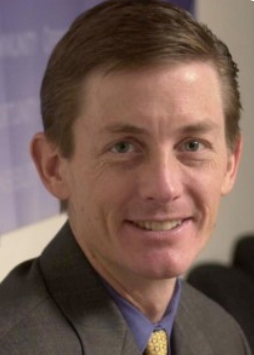
Bruce Reed
White House Deputy Chief of Staff
(announced December 22)

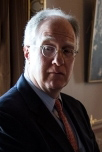
Mike Donilon
Senior Advisor
(announced November 17)

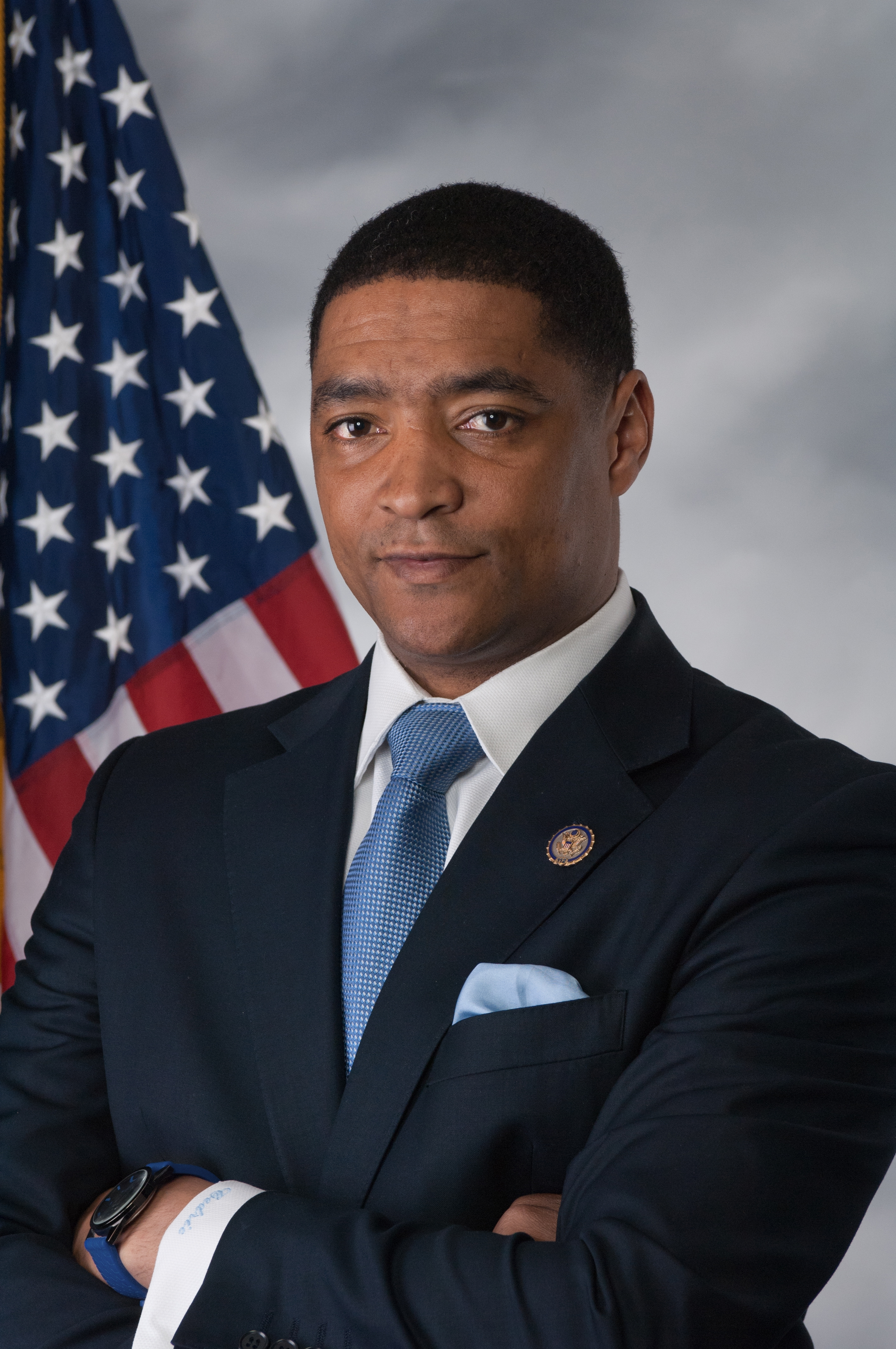
Cedric Richmond
Senior Advisor & Director of the Office of Public Engagement
(announced November 17)

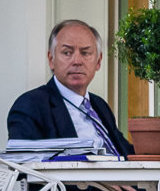
Steve Ricchetti
Counselor to the President
(announced November 17)

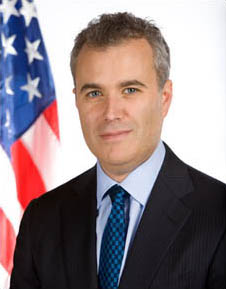
Jeff Zients
Counselor/COVID Coordinator
(announced December 7)

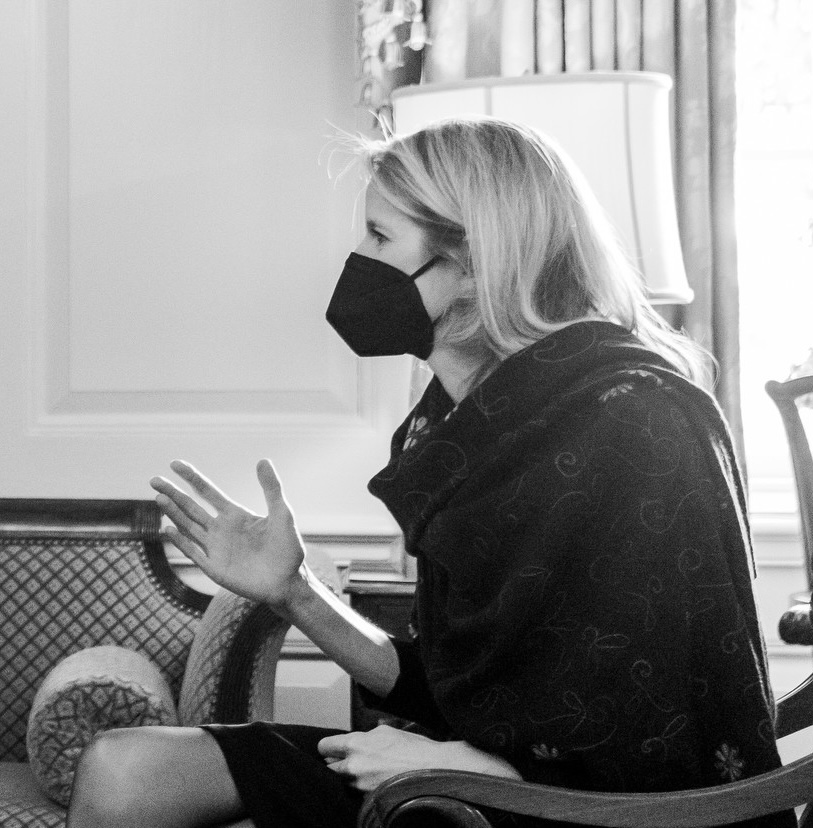
Dana Remus
White House Counsel
(announced November 17)

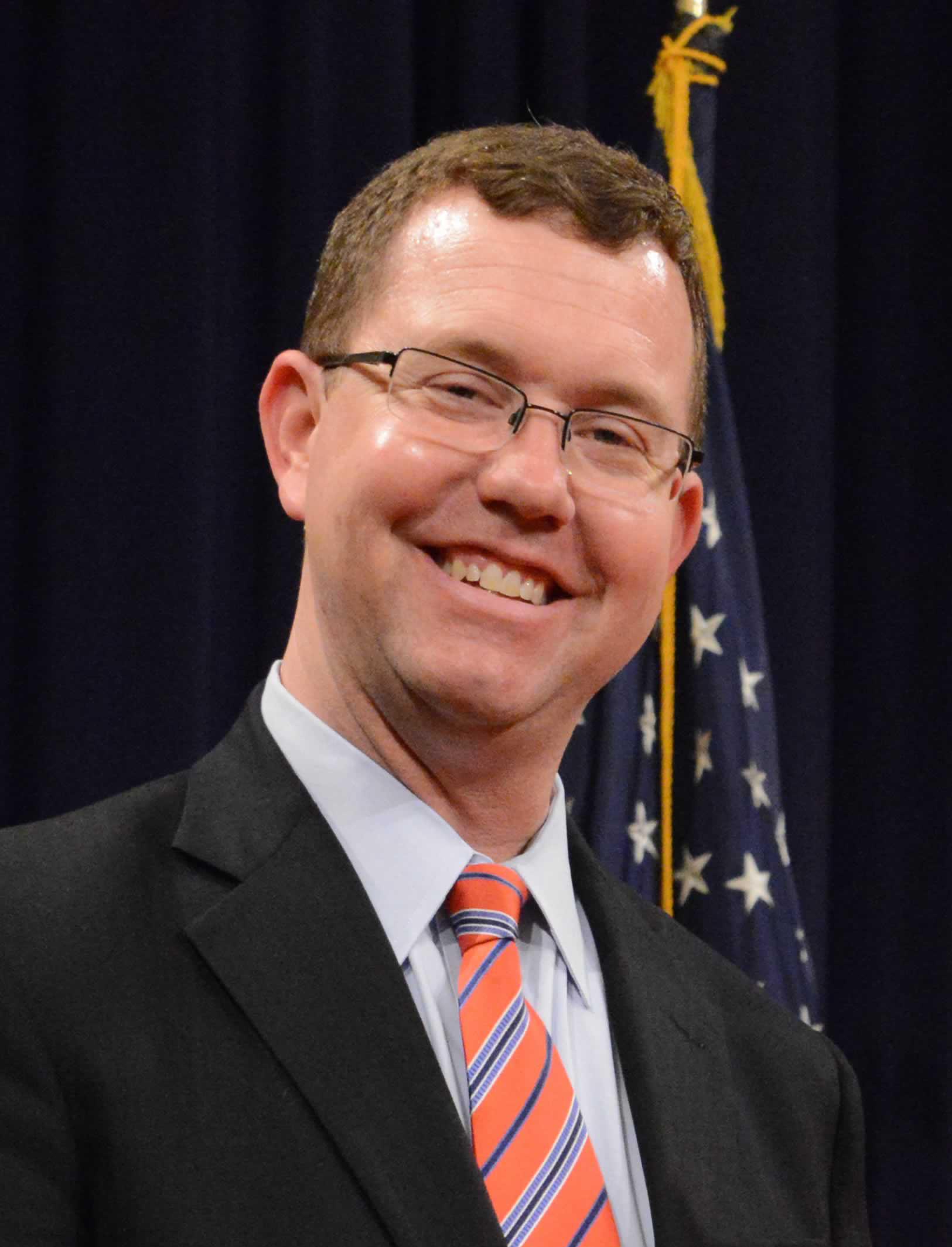
Stuart Delery
Deputy Counsel to the President
(announced December 23)

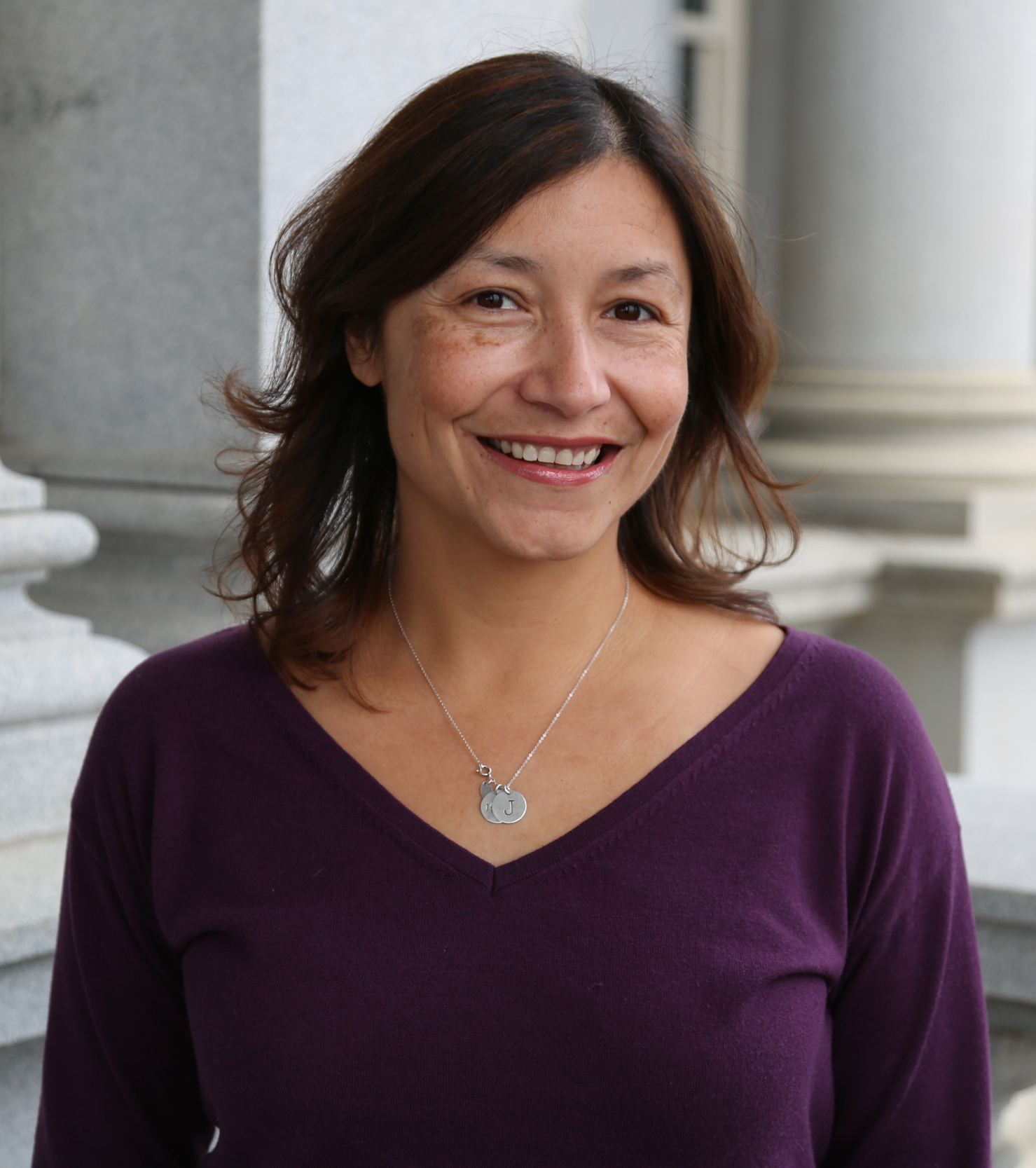
Julie Rodriguez
Director of the White House Office of Intergovernmental Affairs
(announced November 17)

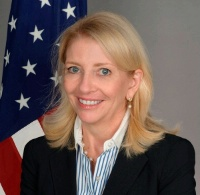
Cathy Russell
Director of White House Presidential Personnel Office
(announced November 20)

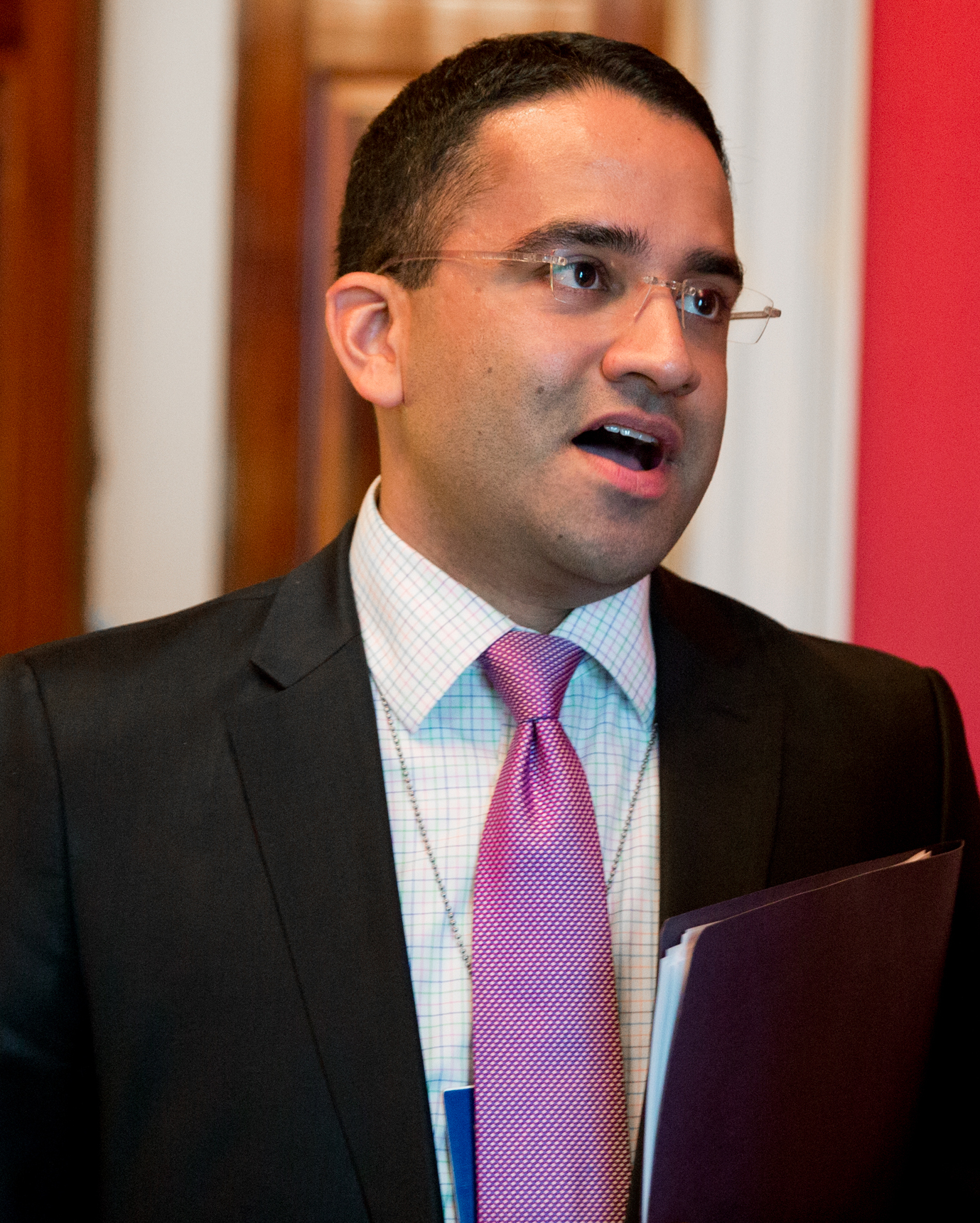
Gautam Raghavan
Deputy Director of White House Presidential Personnel
(announced December 22)

Annie Tomasini
Director of Oval Office Operations
(announced November 17)

Jessica Hertz
Staff Secretary
(announced December 30)

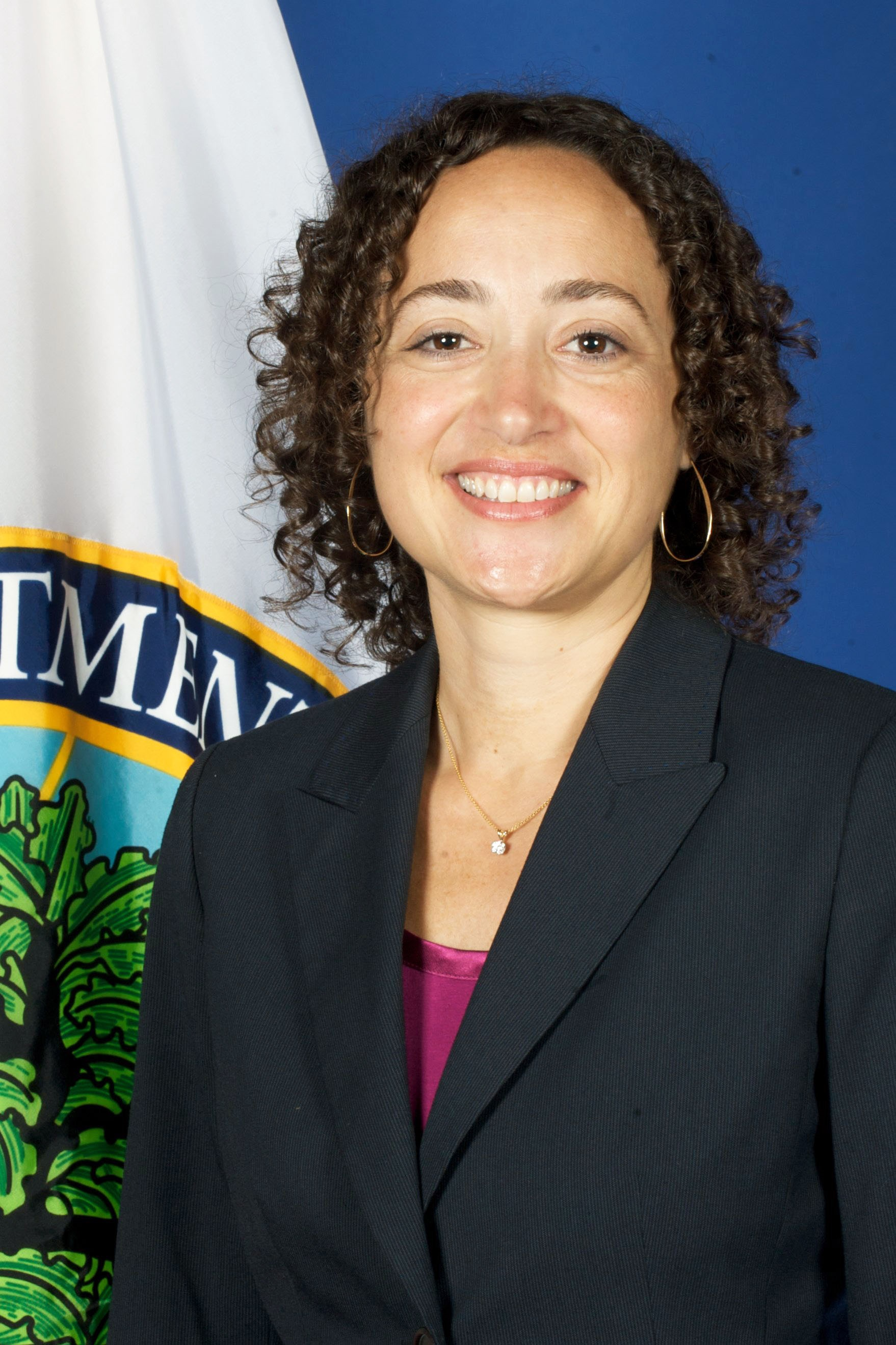
Catherine E. Lhamon
Deputy Director, Domestic Policy Council for Racial Justice and Equality
(announced January 14)

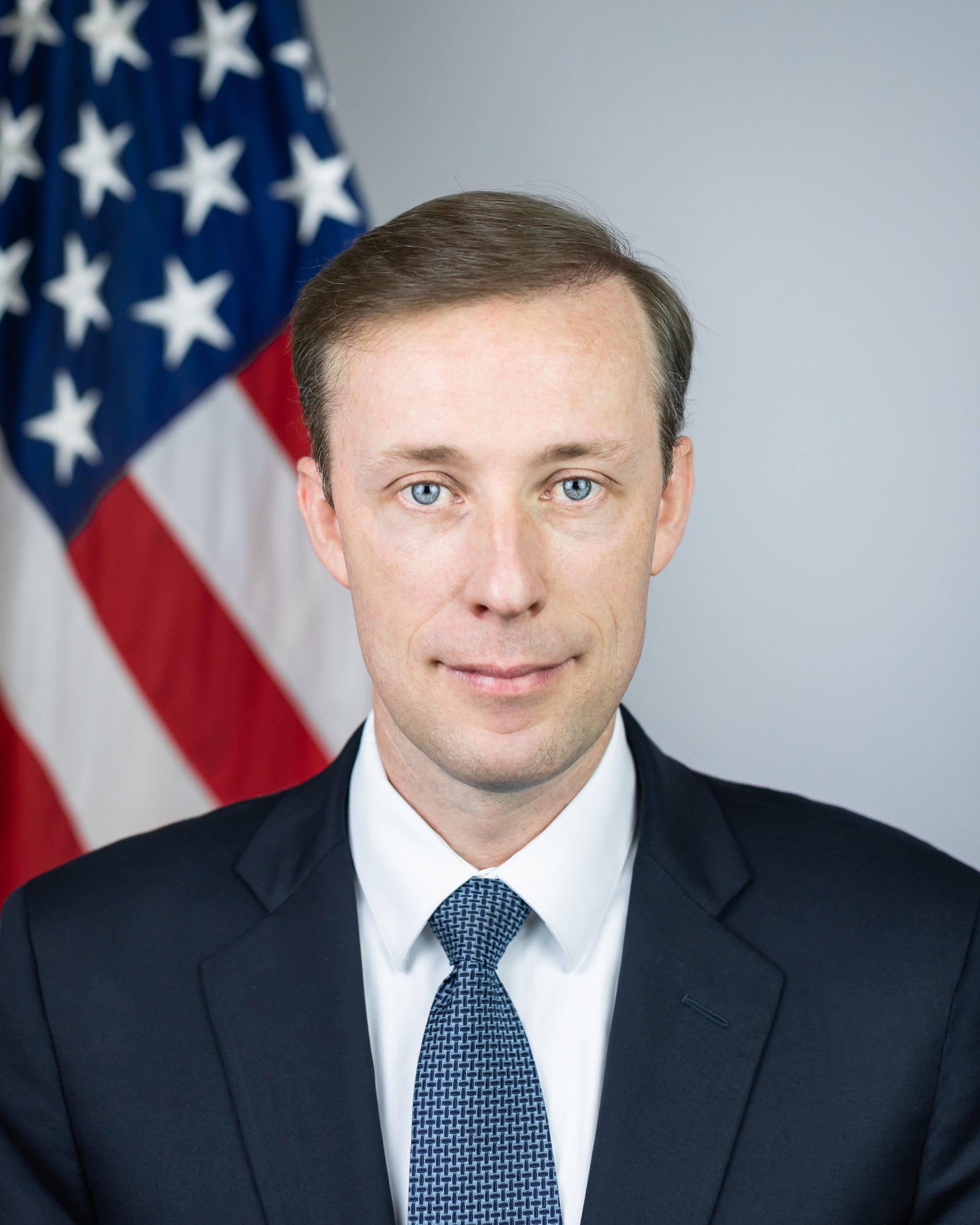
Jake Sullivan
Assistant to the President for National Security Affairs
(announced November 24)

==== Office of Communications ====
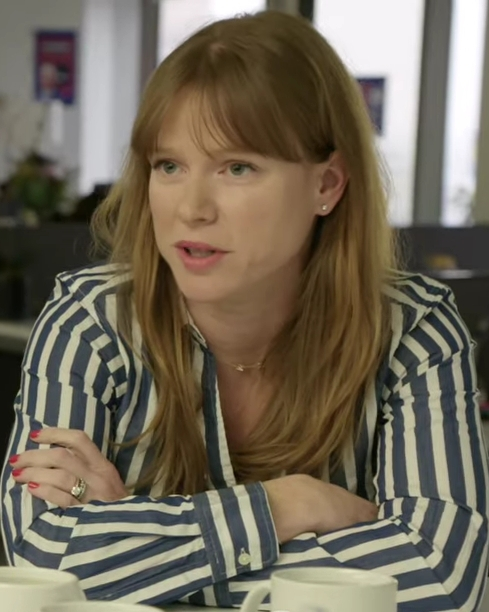
Kate Bedingfield
White House Communications Director
(announced November 29)

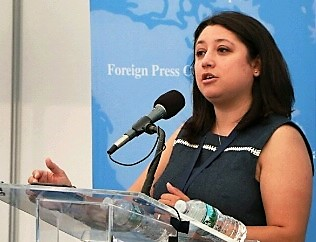
Pili Tobar
Deputy White House Communications Director
(announced November 29)

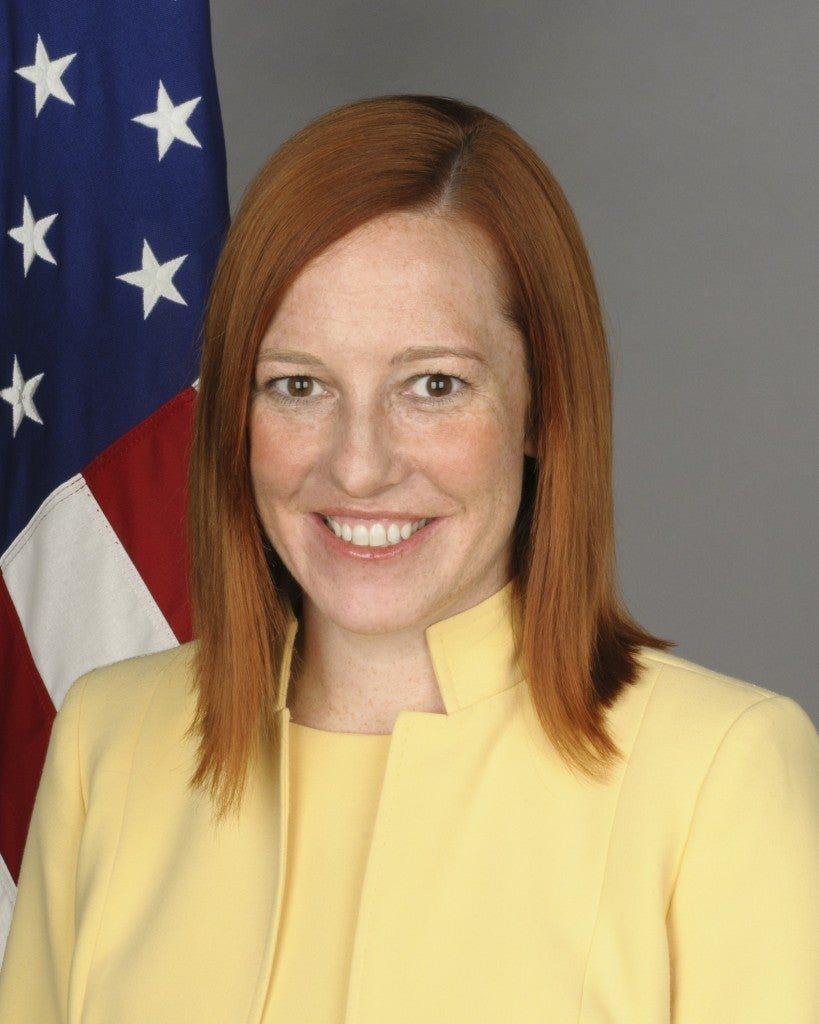
Jen Psaki
White House Press Secretary
(announced November 29)

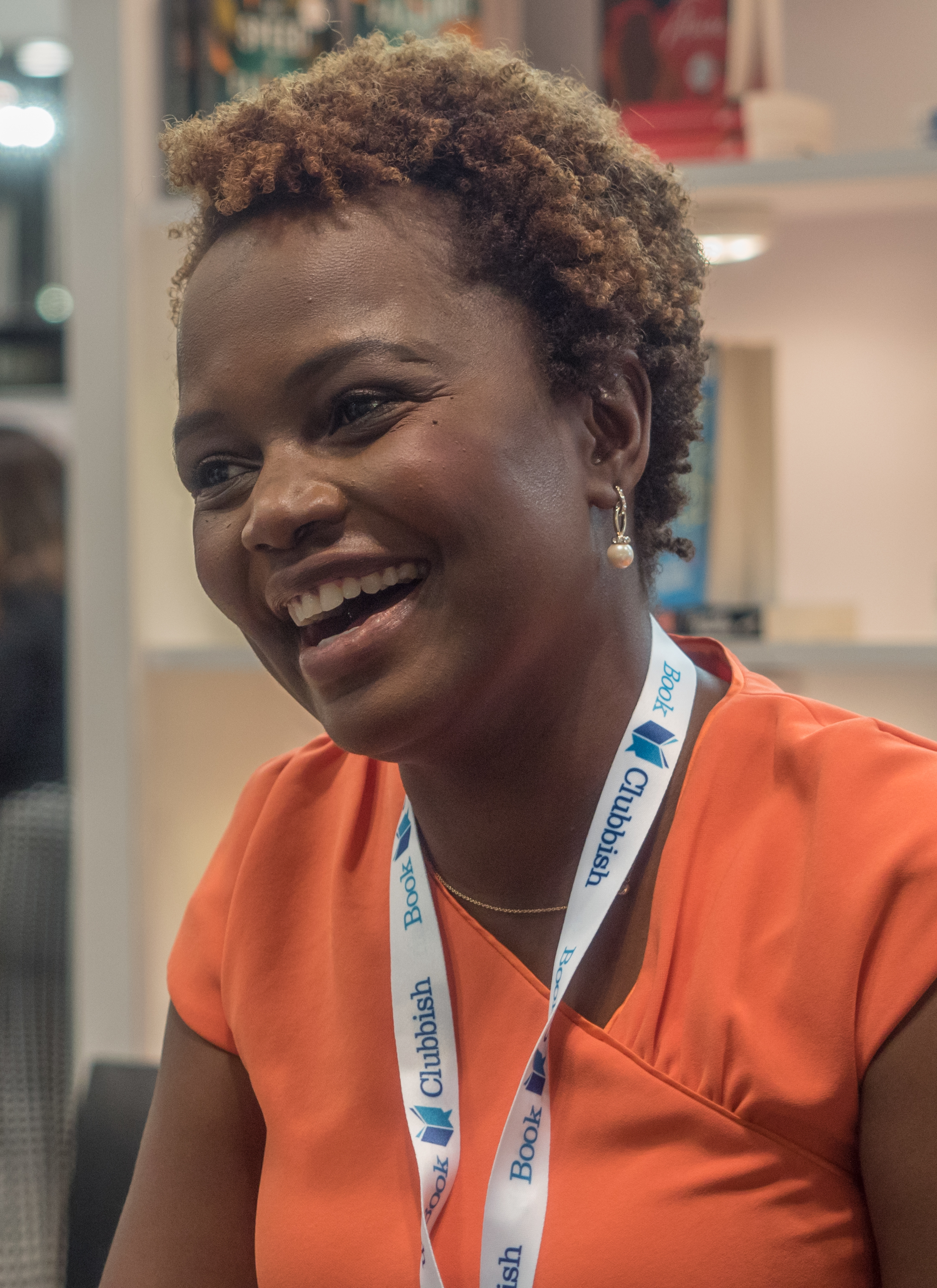
Karine Jean-Pierre
Principal Deputy Press Secretary
(announced November 29)

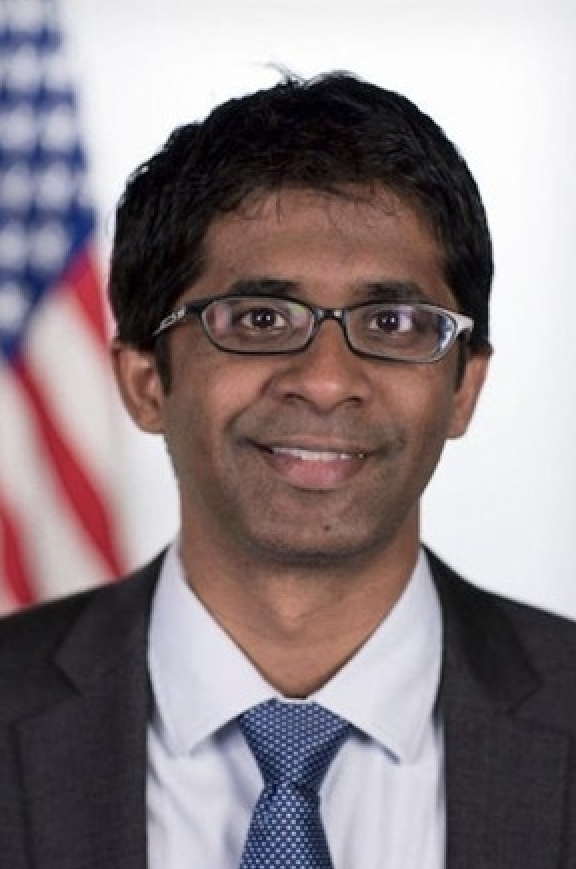
Vinay Reddy
Director of Speechwriting
(announced December 22)

==== Office of the Vice President ====
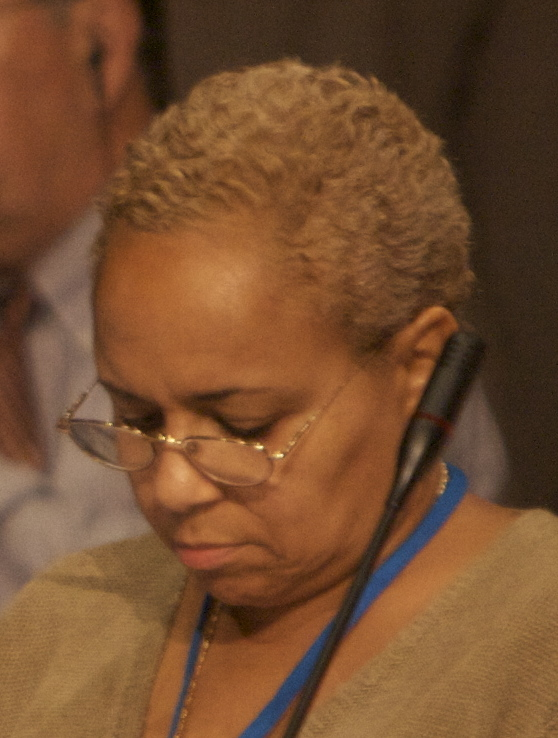
Hartina Flournoy
Chief of Staff to the Vice President
(announced December 3)

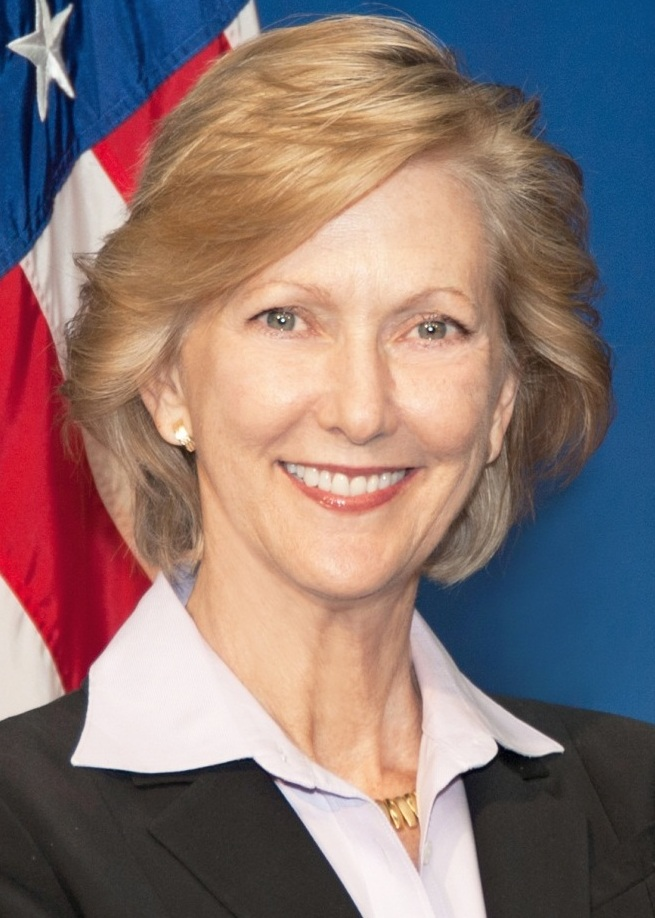
Nancy McEldowney
National Security Advisor to the Vice President
(announced December 3)

Michale Fuchs
Deputy Chief of Staff to the Vice President
(announced December 3)

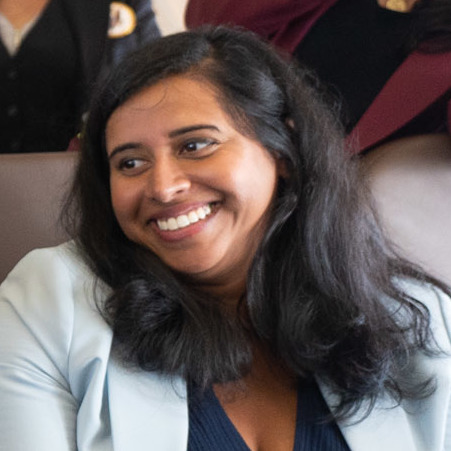
Rohini Kosoglu
Policy Advisor to the Vice President
(announced December 3)

Ashley Etienne
Communications Director for the Vice President
(announced November 29)

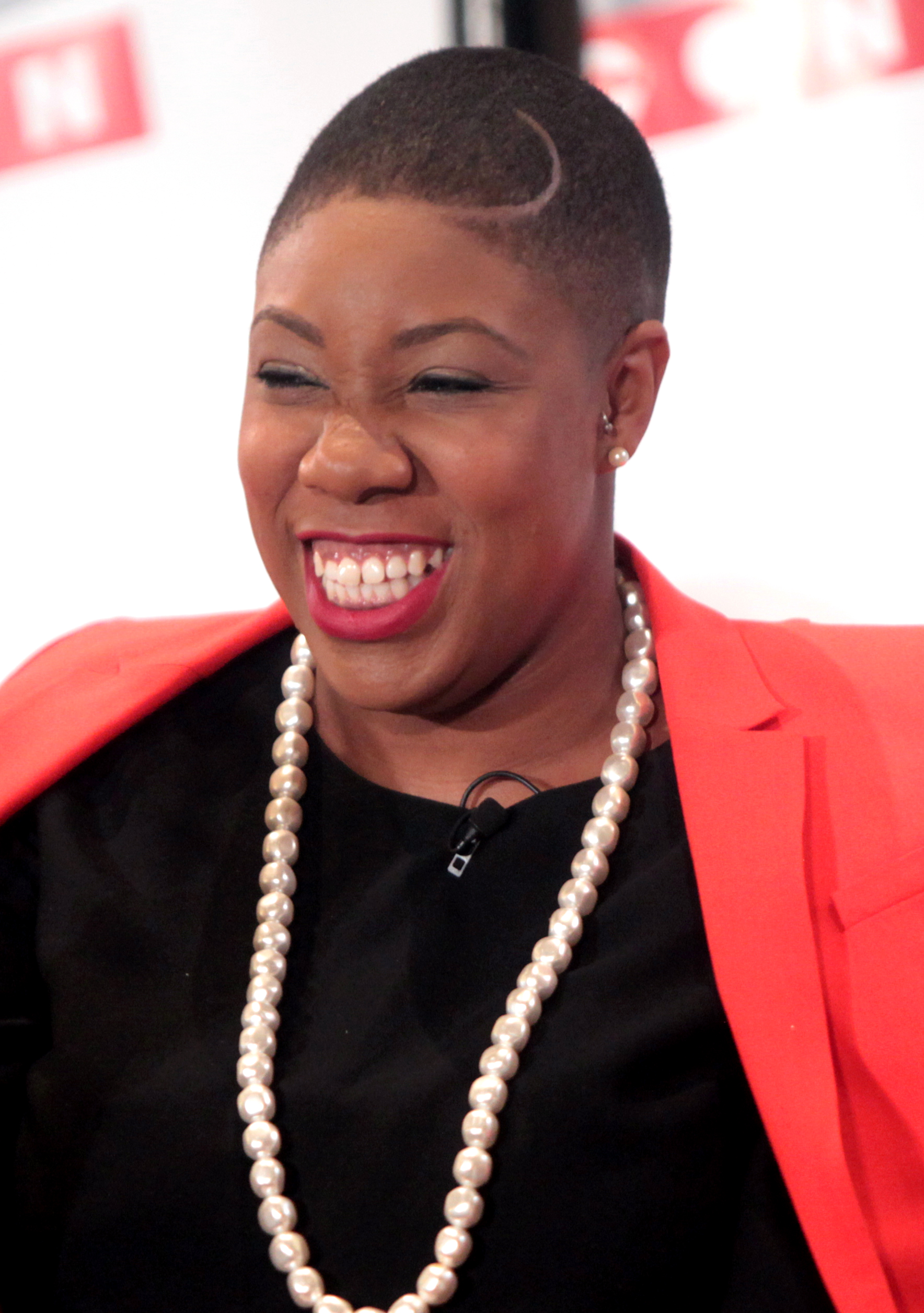
Symone Sanders
Senior Advisor and Chief Spokesperson to the Vice President
(announced November 29)

Cynthia Bernstein
Director of Management and Administration for the Vice President
(announced December 30)

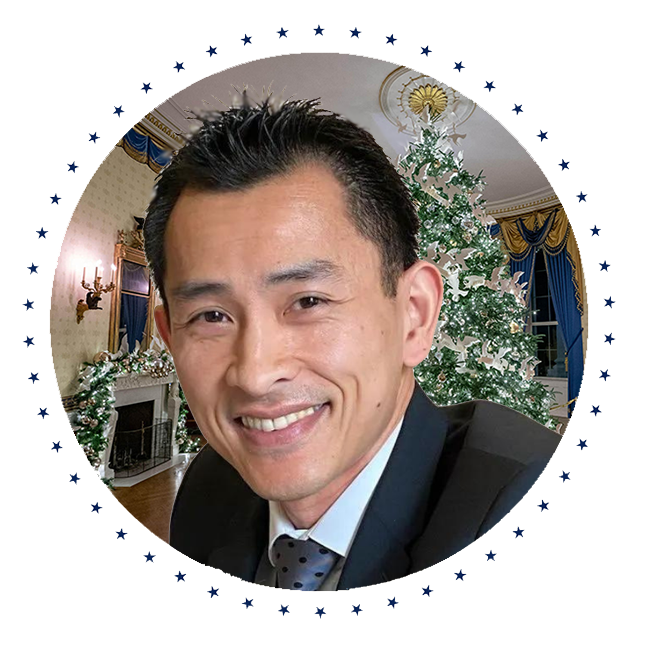
Josh Hsu
Counsel to the Vice President
(announced December 30)

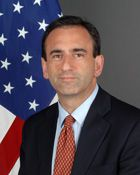
Philip H. Gordon
Deputy National Security Advisor to the Vice President
(announced January 16)

Herbie Ziskend
Deputy Communications Director for the Vice President
(announced November 29)

==== Office of the First Lady ====
Anthony Bernal
Senior Advisor to the First Lady
(announced November 17)

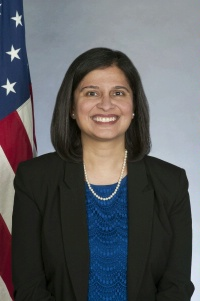
Mala Adiga
Policy Director to the First Lady
(announced November 20)

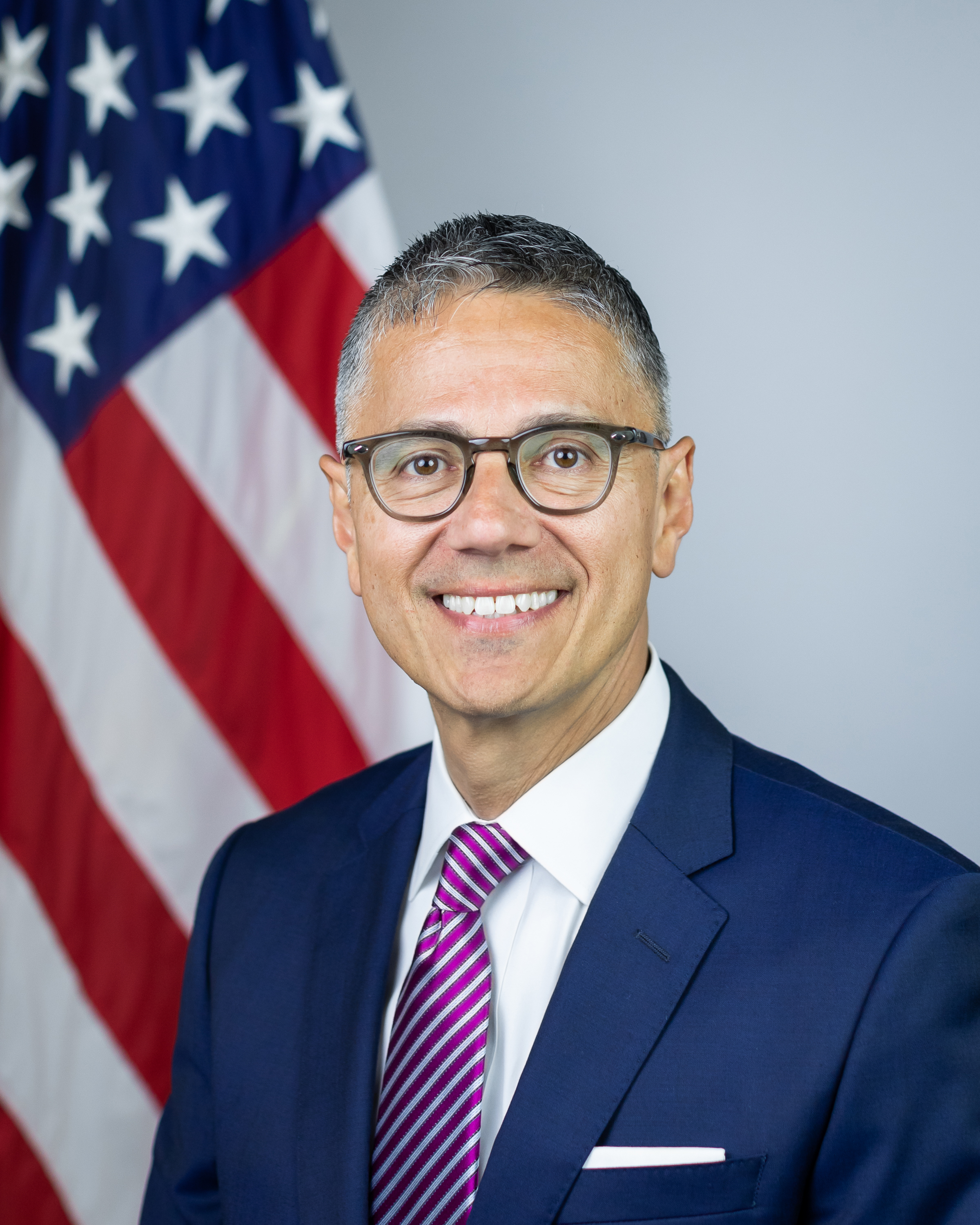
Carlos Elizondo
White House Social Secretary
(announced November 20)

Elizabeth E. Alexander
Communications Director for the First Lady
(announced November 29)

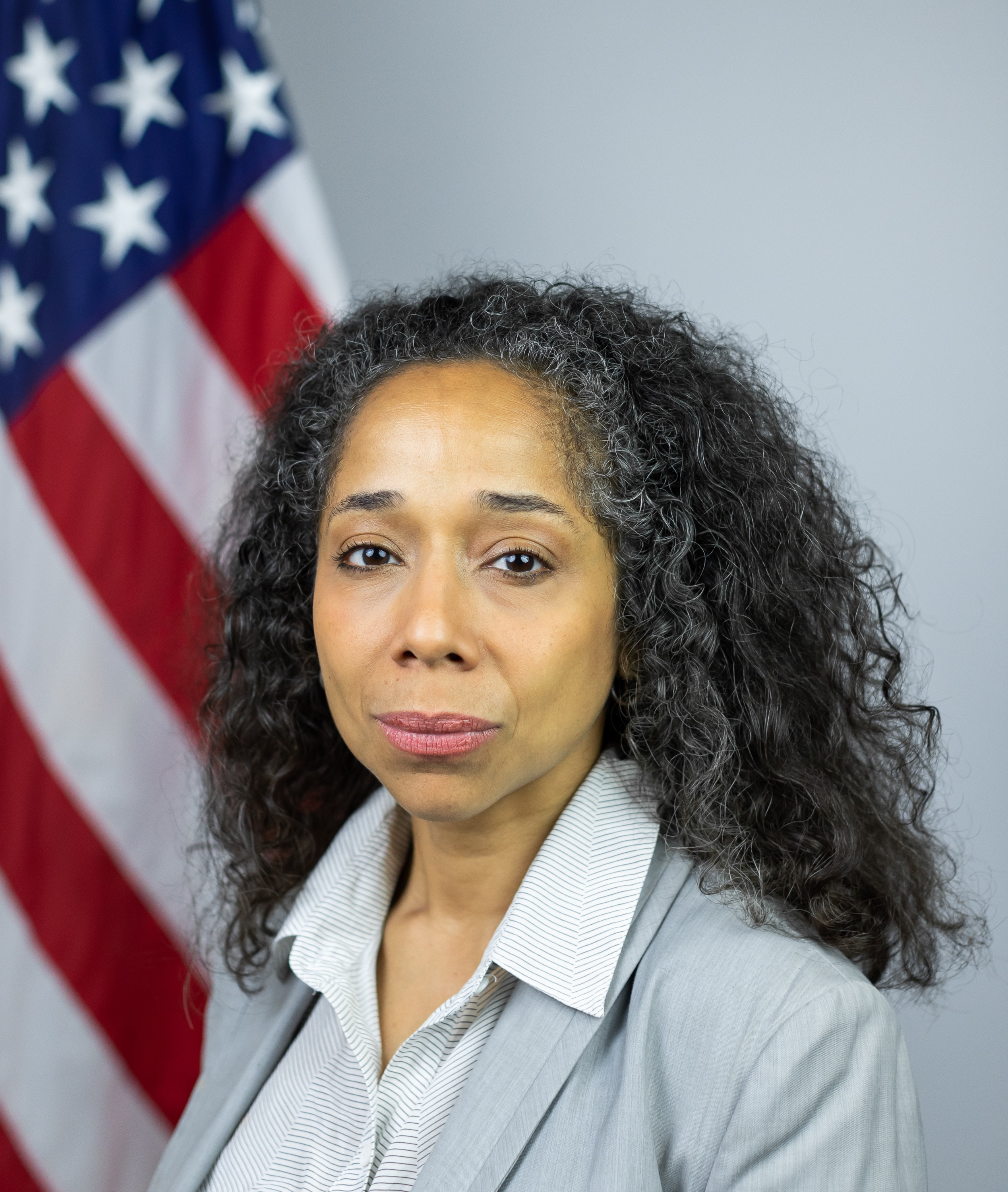
Julissa Reynoso Pantaleón
Chief of Staff to the First Lady
(announced November 17)

==== Domestic policy ====
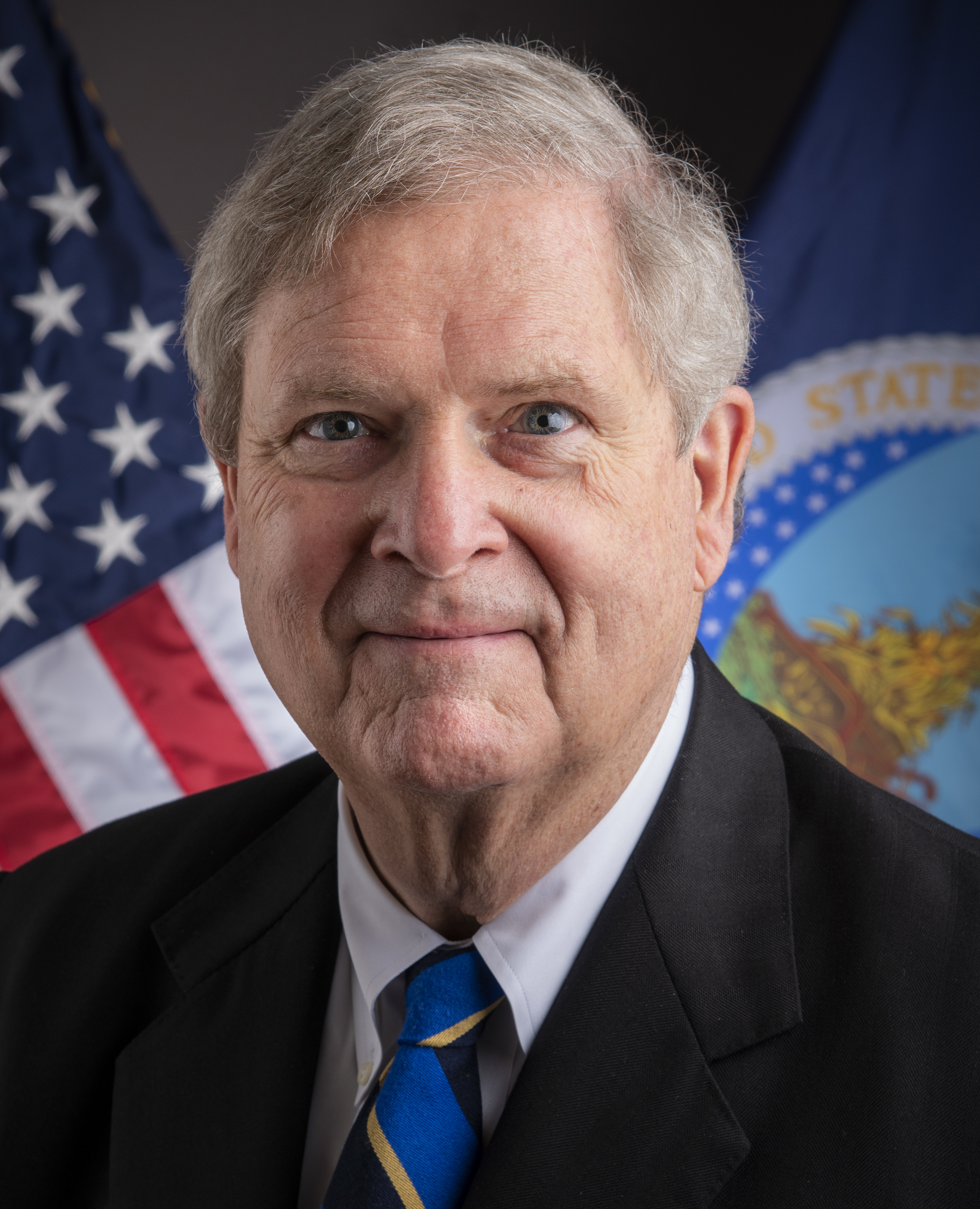
Tom Vilsack
Secretary of Agriculture
(announced December 10)

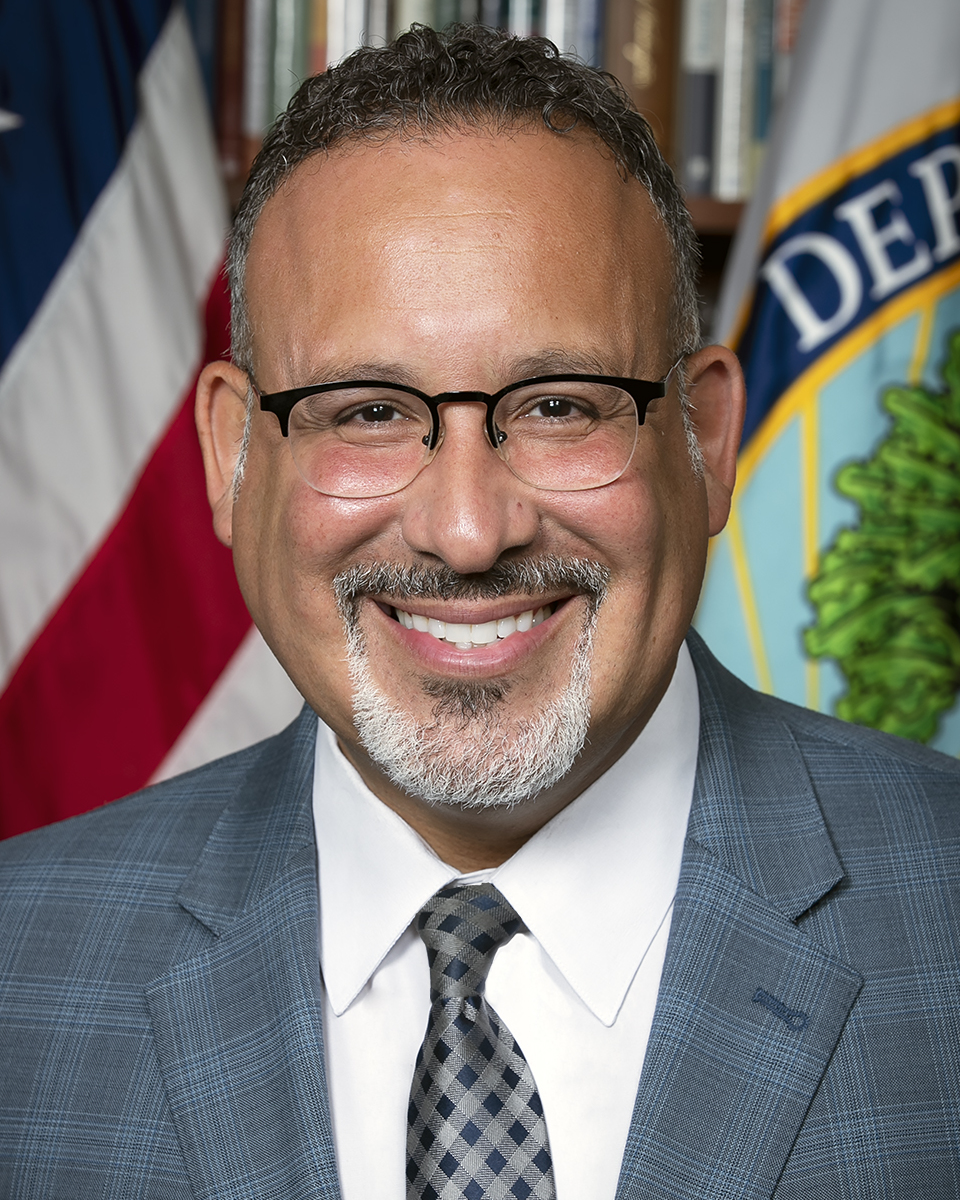
Miguel Cardona
Secretary of Education
(announced December 22)

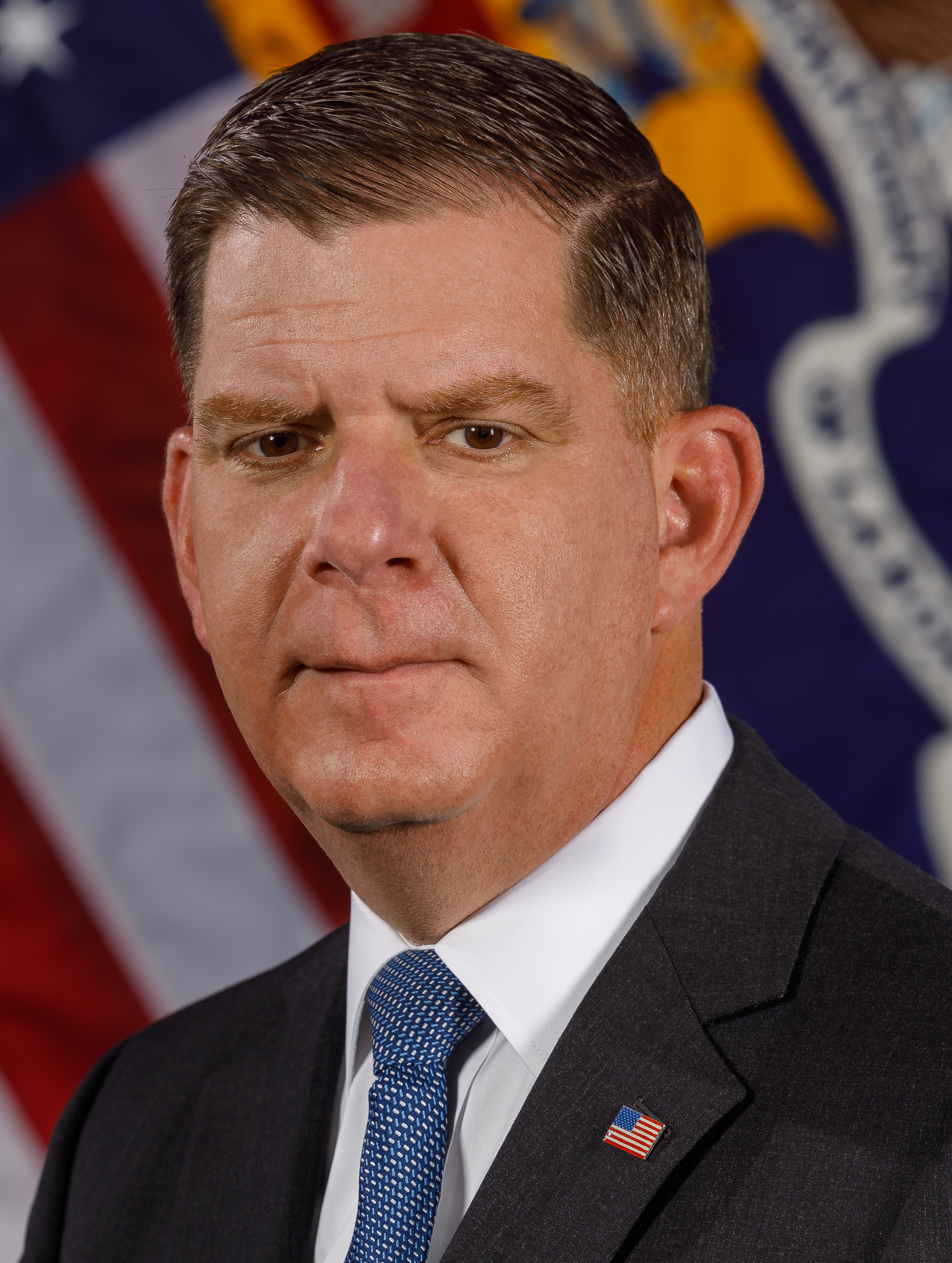
Marty Walsh
Secretary of Labor
(reported January 7)

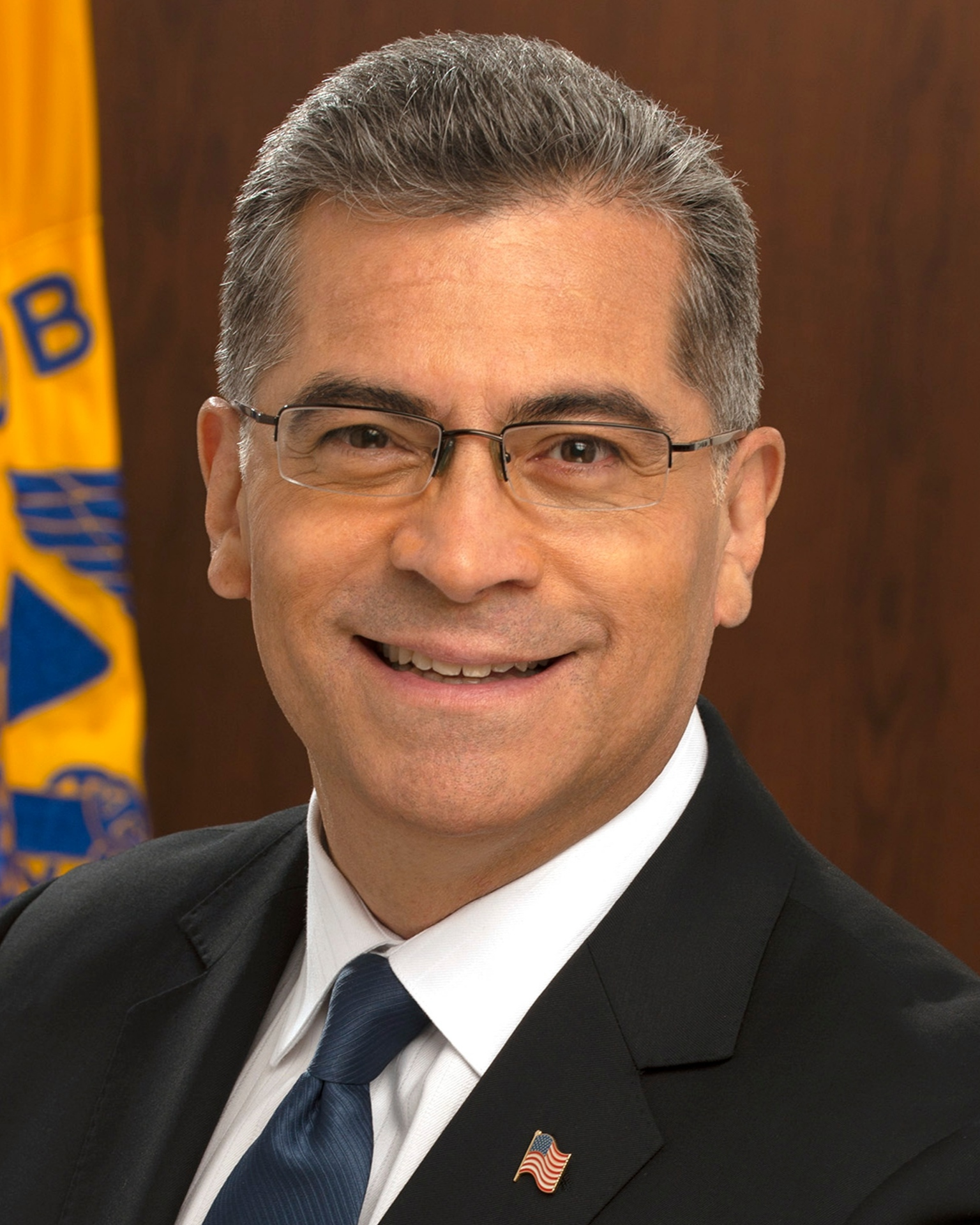
Xavier Becerra
Secretary of Health and Human Services
(announced December 7)

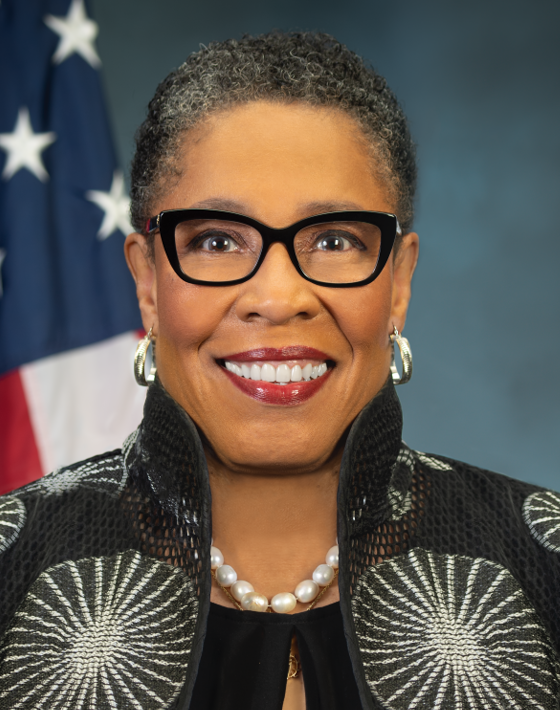
Marcia Fudge
Secretary of Housing and Urban Development
(announced December 10)

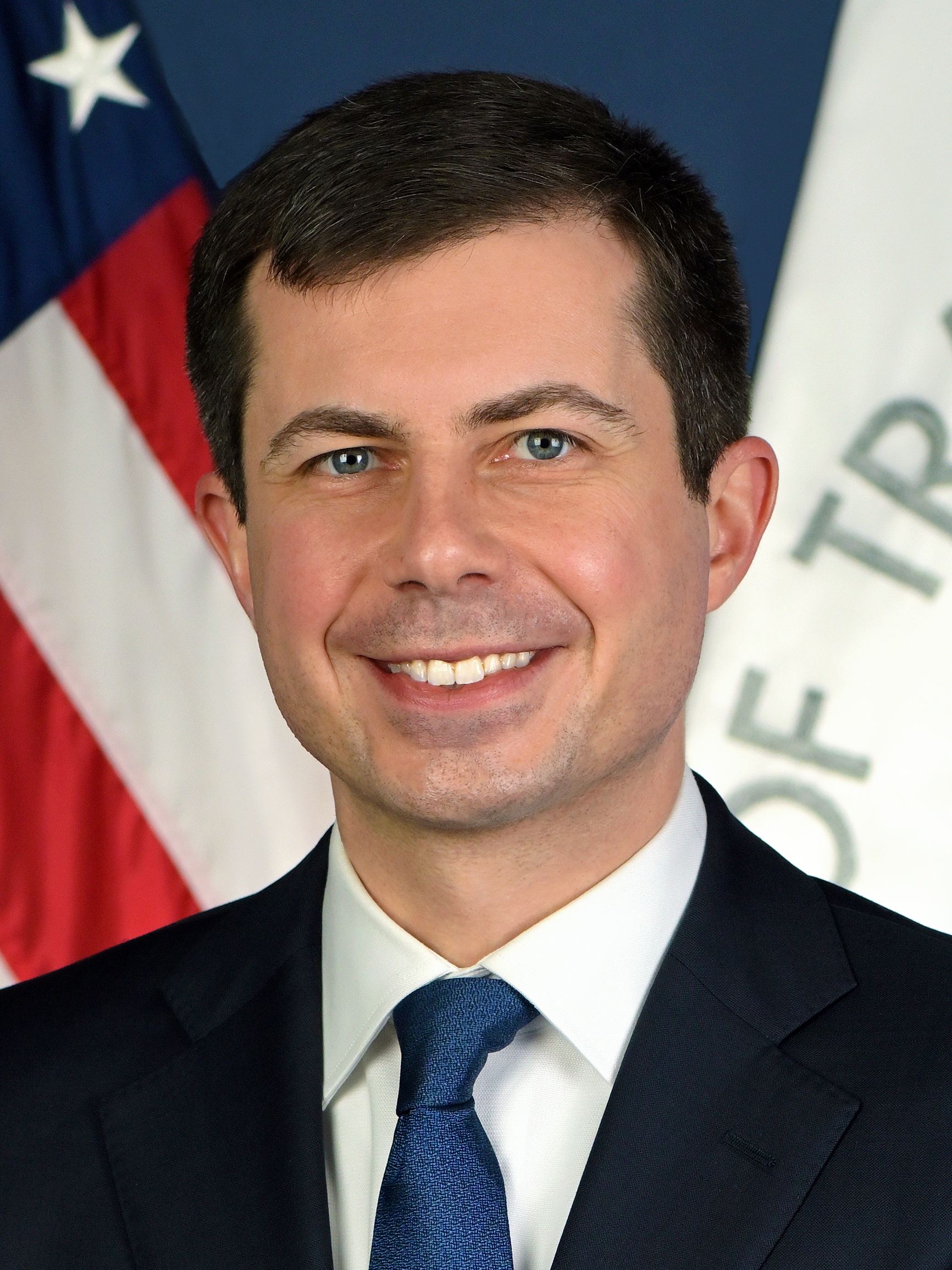
Pete Buttigieg
Secretary of Transportation
(announced December 15)

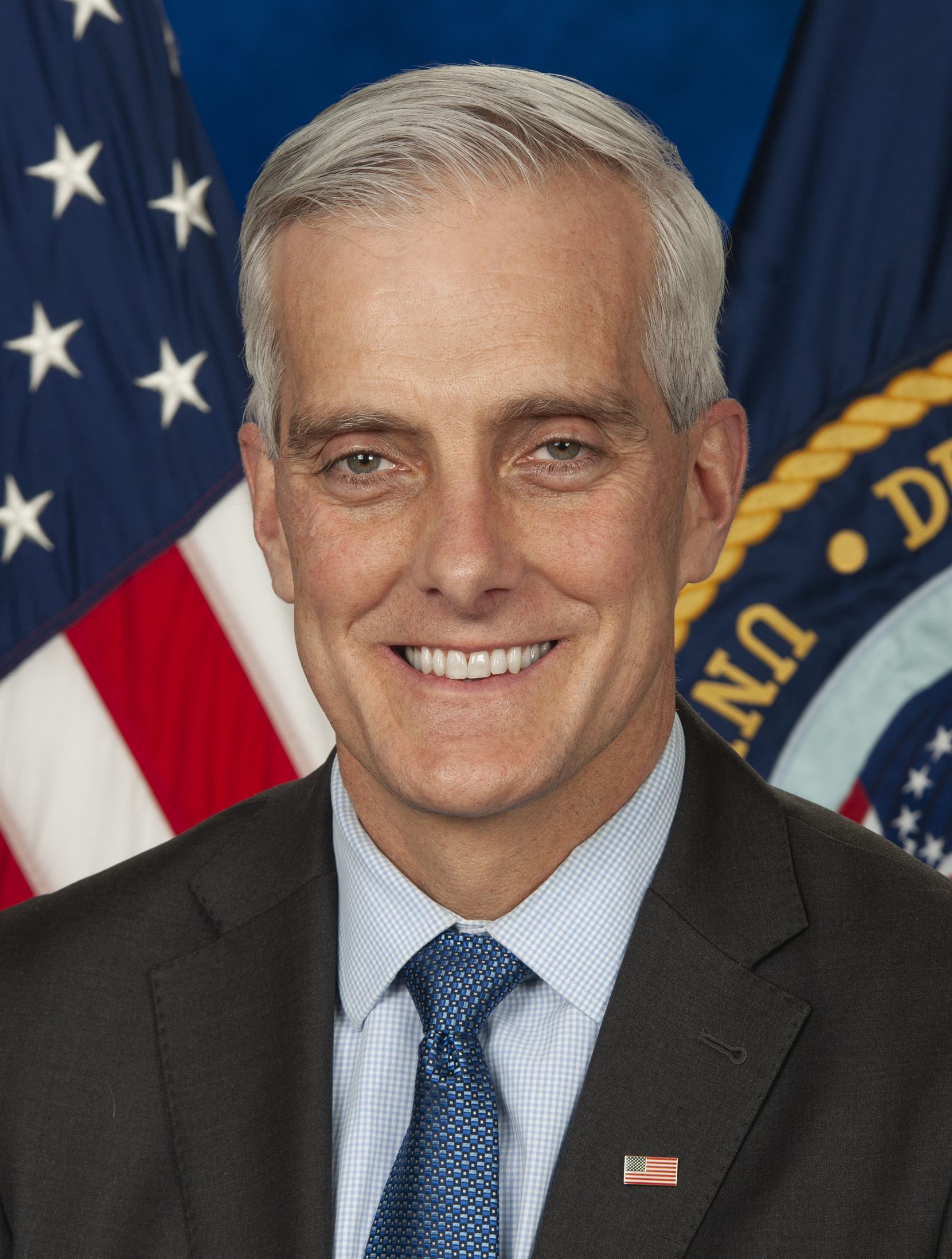
Denis McDonough
Secretary of Veterans Affairs
(announced December 10)

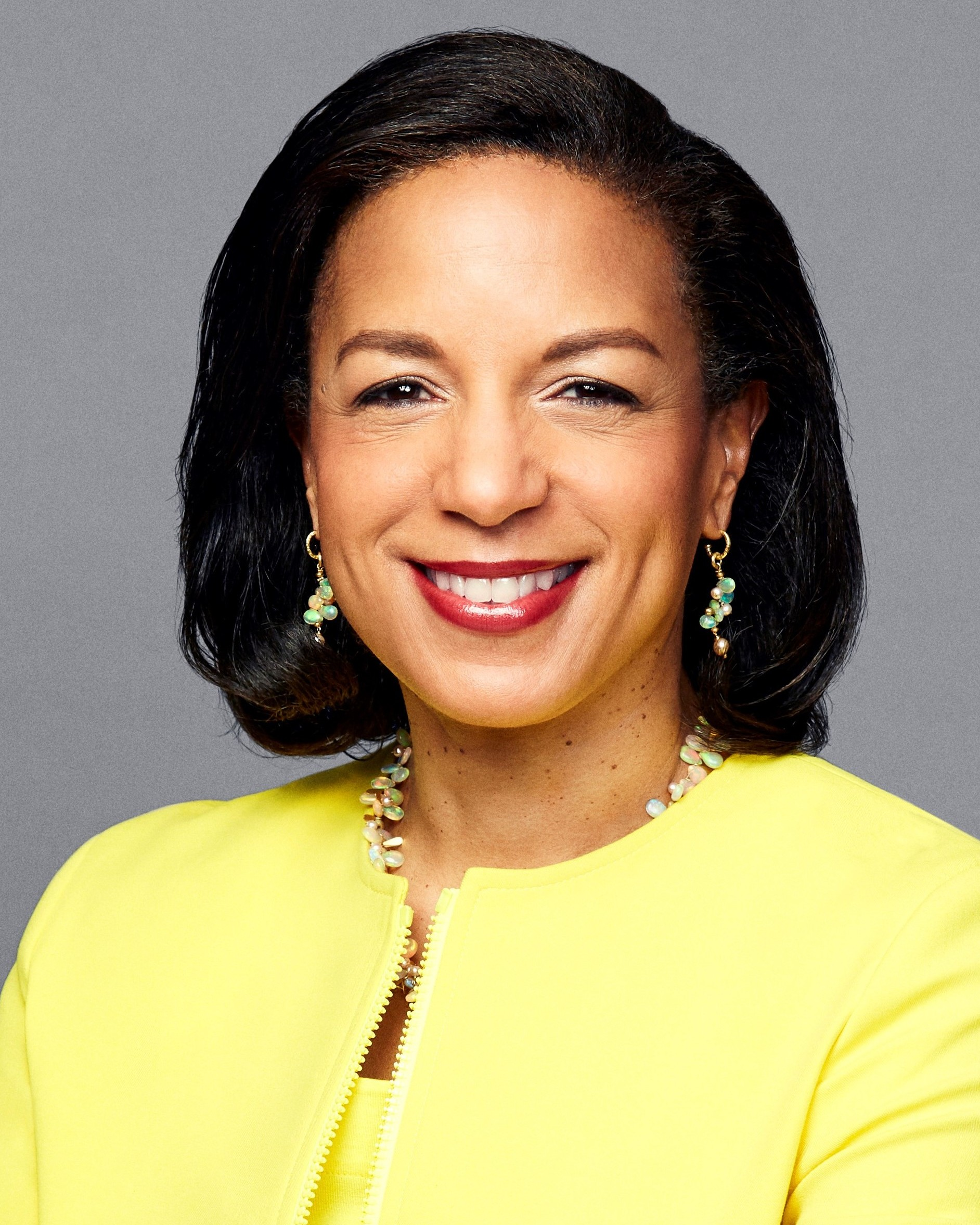
Susan Rice
Director of the United States Domestic Policy Council
(announced December 10)

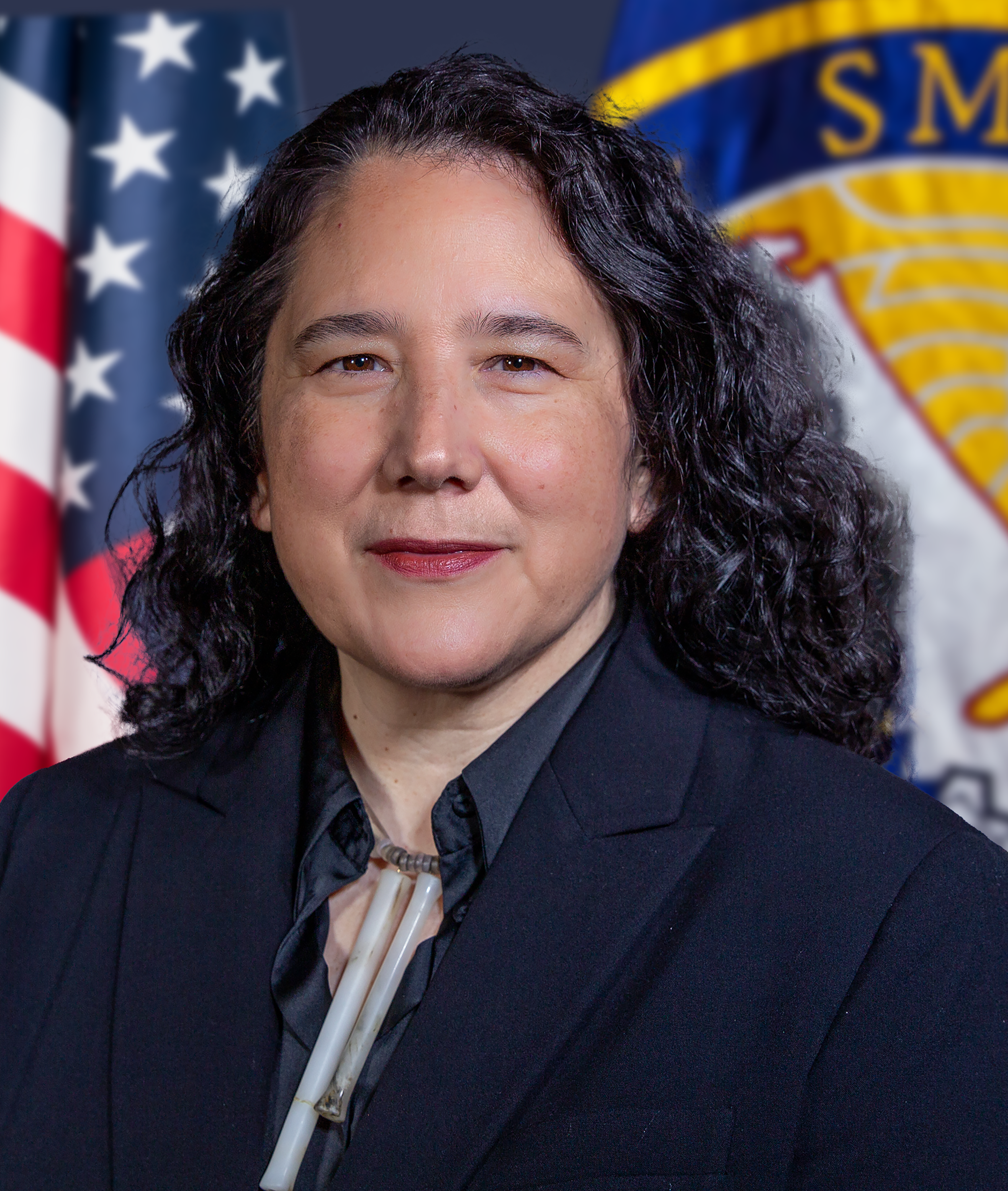
Isabel Guzman
Administrator, Small Business Administration
(reported January 7)

==== Economic policy ====
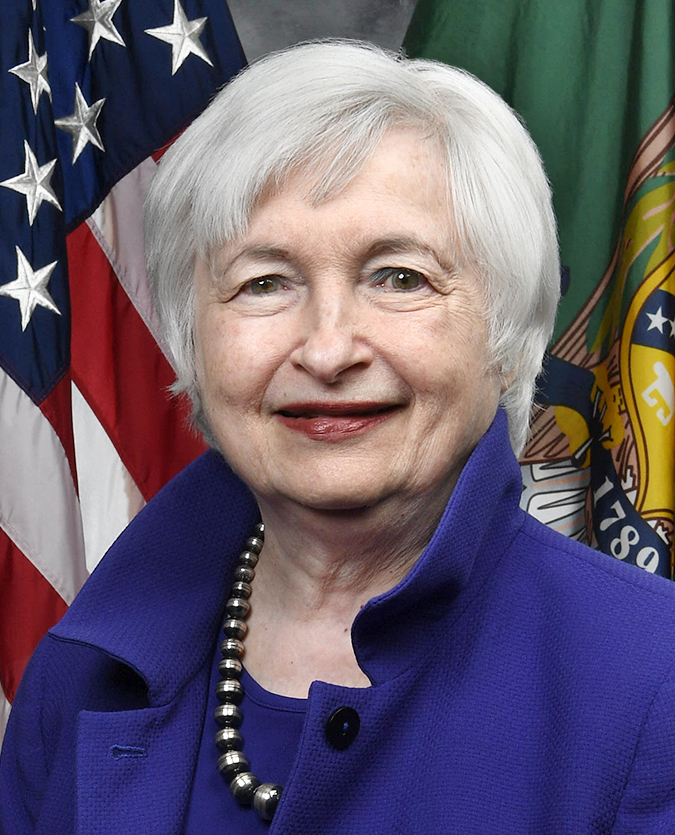
Janet Yellen
Secretary of the Treasury
(announced November 30)

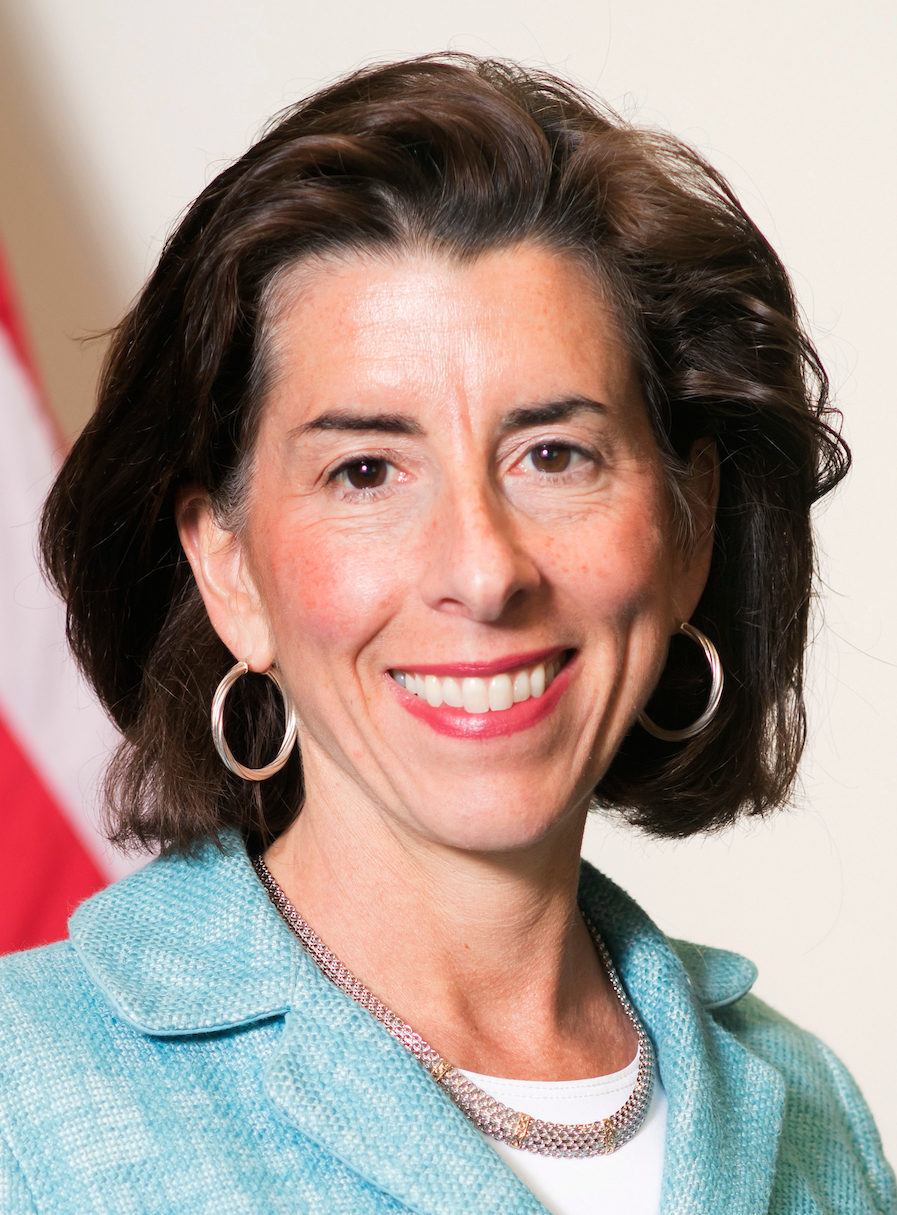
Gina Raimondo
Secretary of Commerce
(reported January 7)

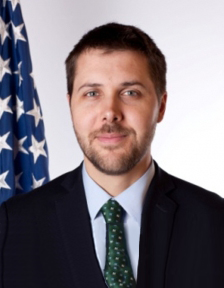
Brian Deese
Assistant to the President for Economic Policy
Director, National Economic Council
(announced December 3)

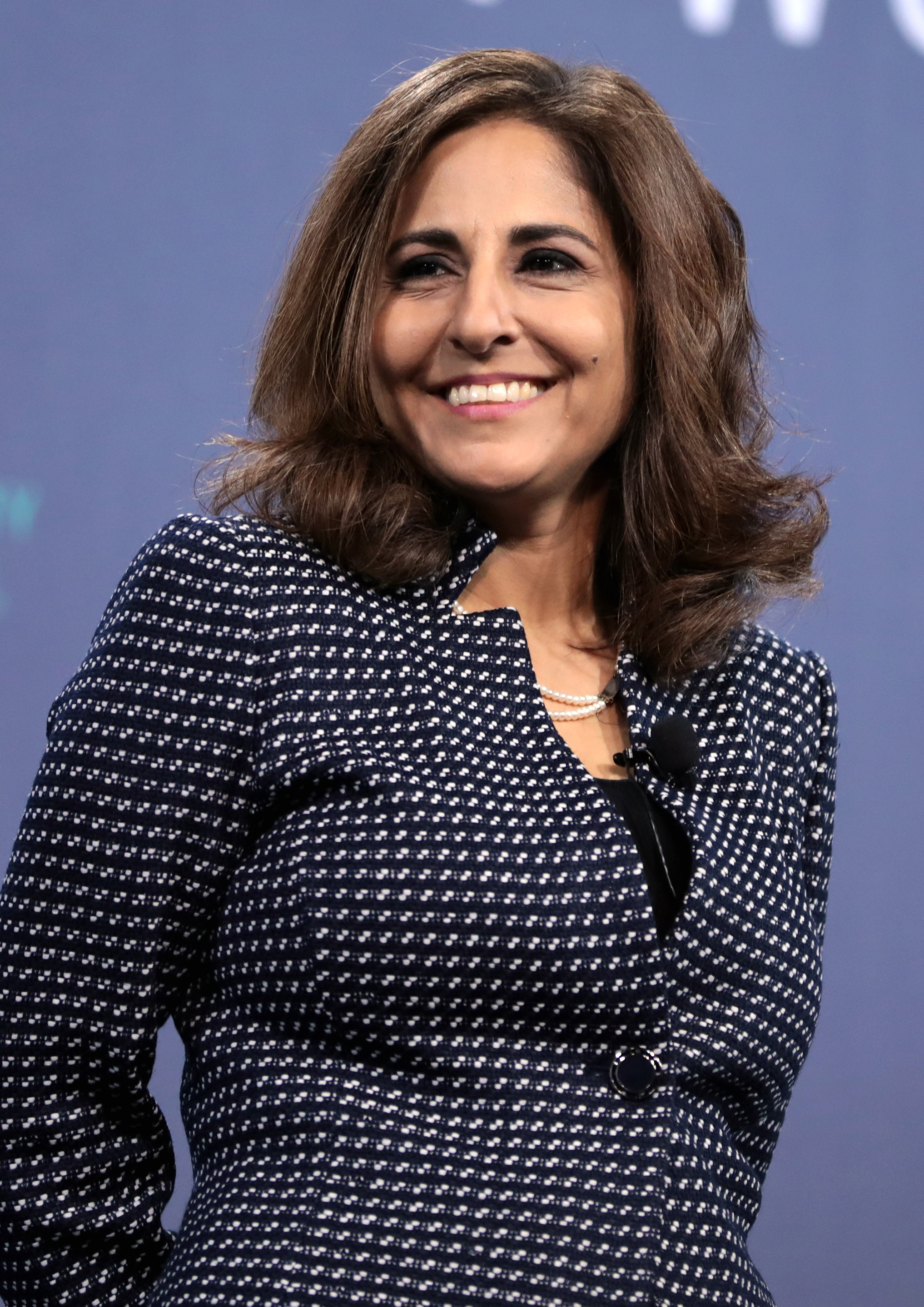
Neera Tanden
Director, Office of Management and Budget
(announced November 30)

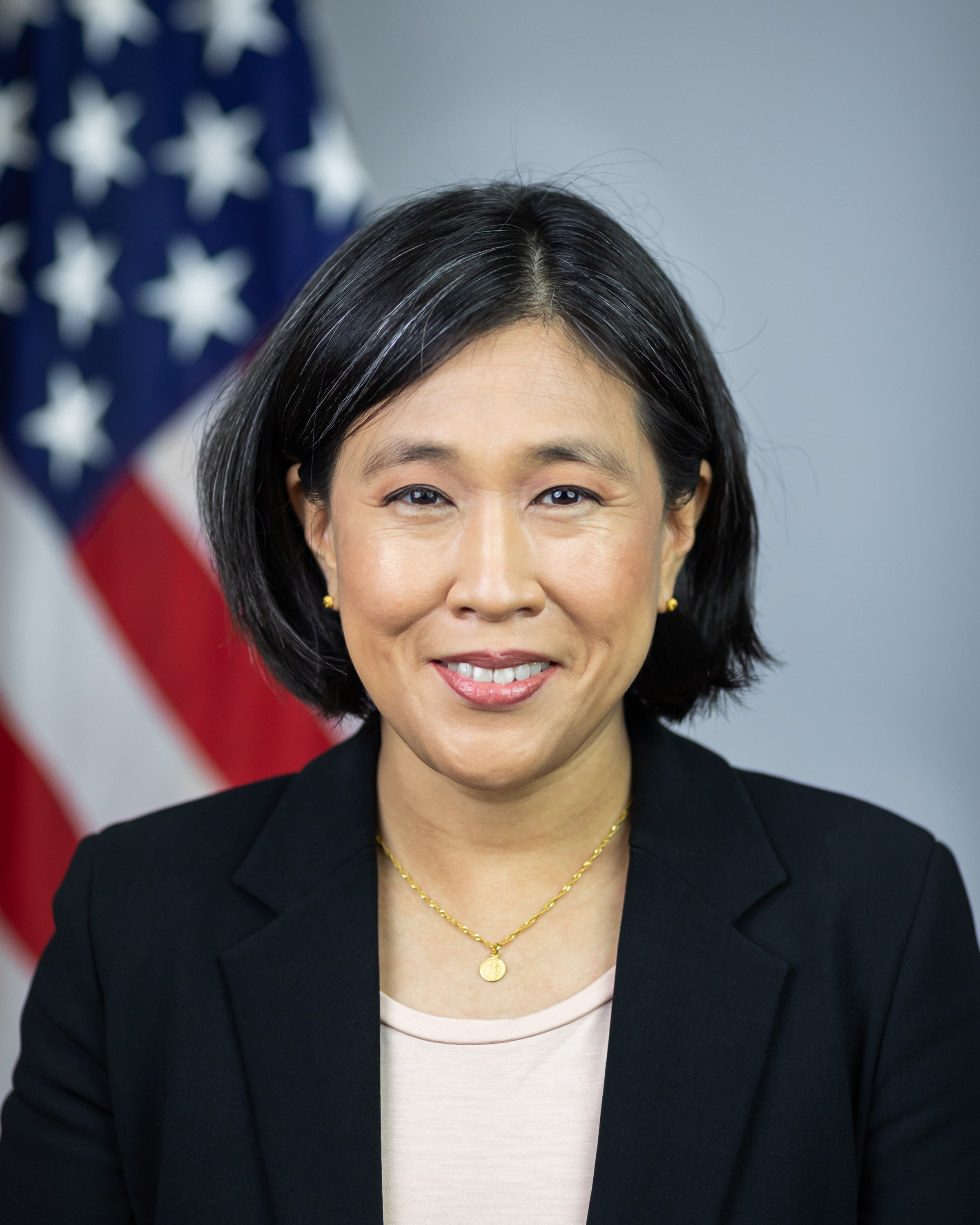
Katherine Tai
United States Trade Representative
(announced December 10)

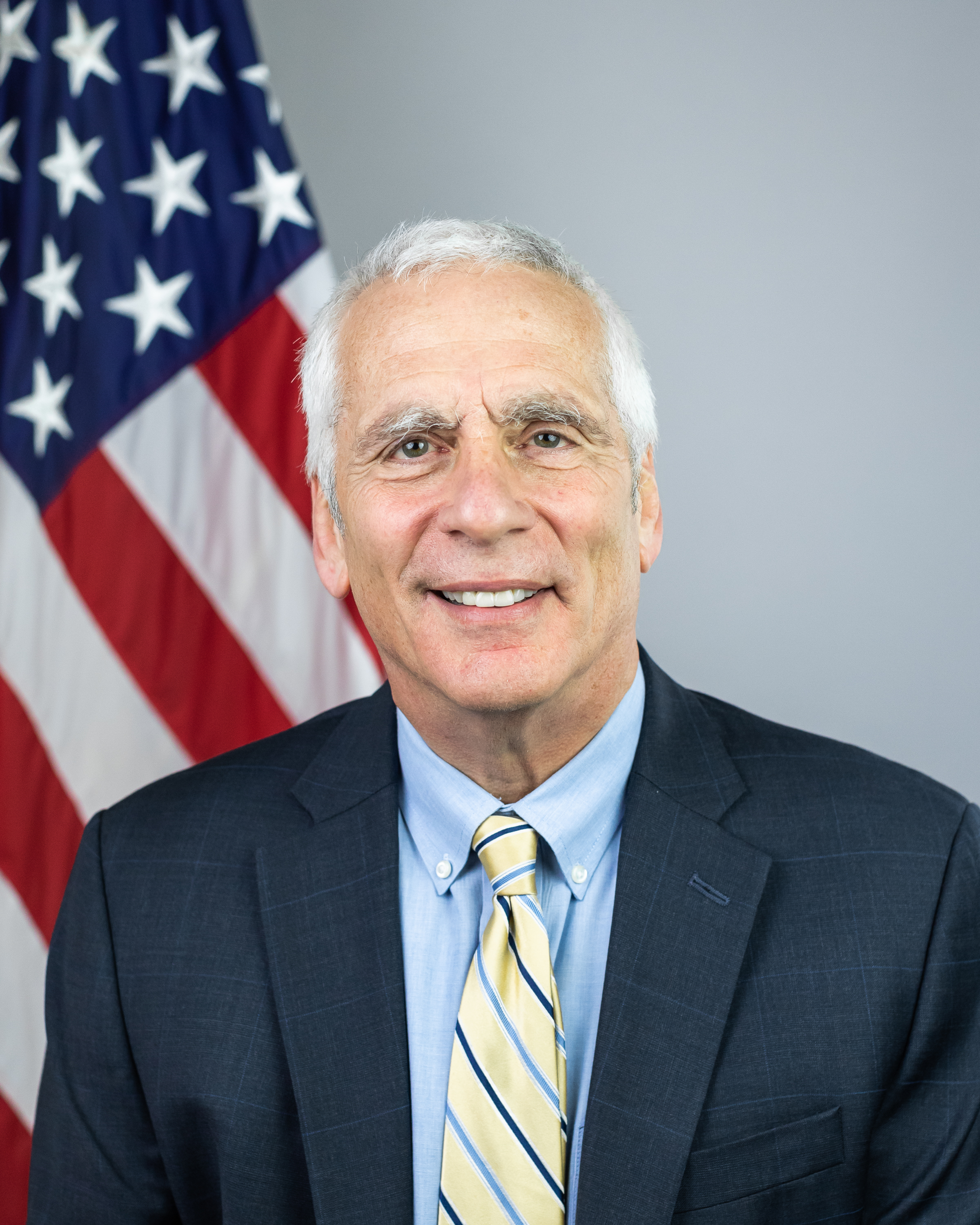
Jared Bernstein
Member of the Council of Economic Advisors
(announced November 30)

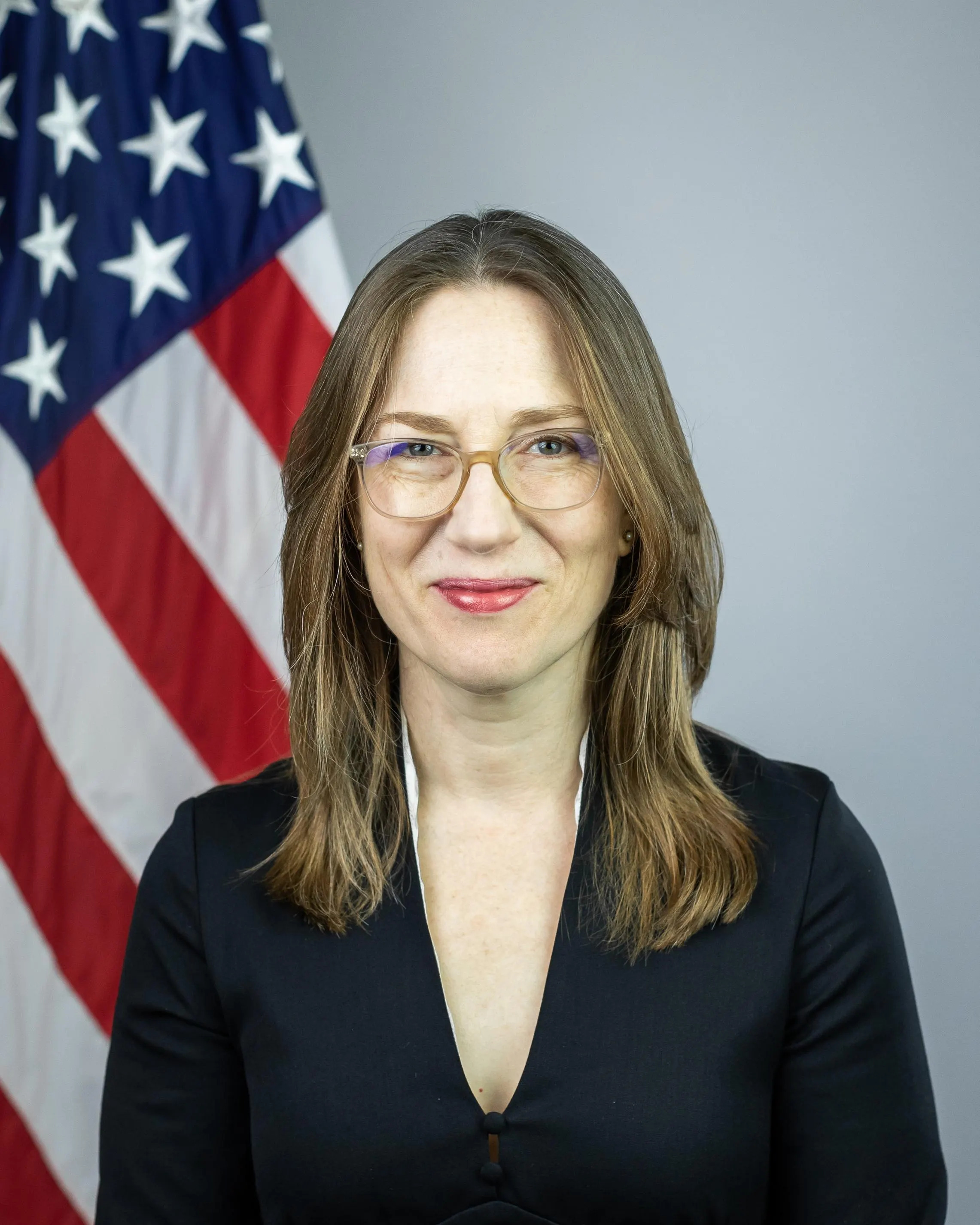
Heather Boushey
Member of the Council of Economic Advisors
(announced November 30)

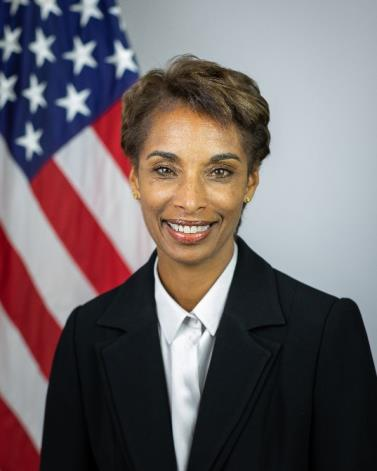
Cecilia Rouse
Chair of the Council of Economic Advisors
(announced November 30)

==== Environment and energy ====
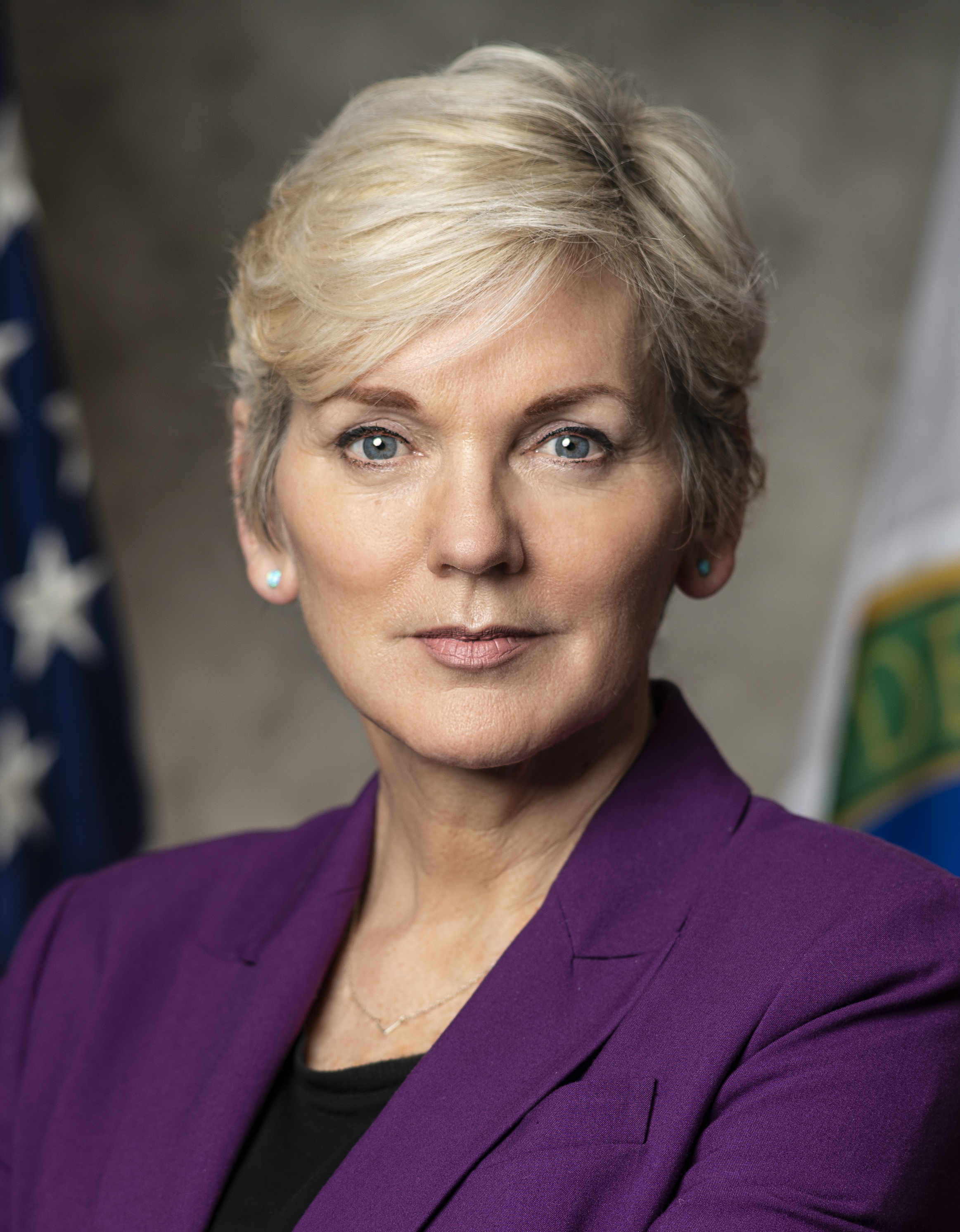
Jennifer Granholm
Secretary of Energy
(announced December 17)

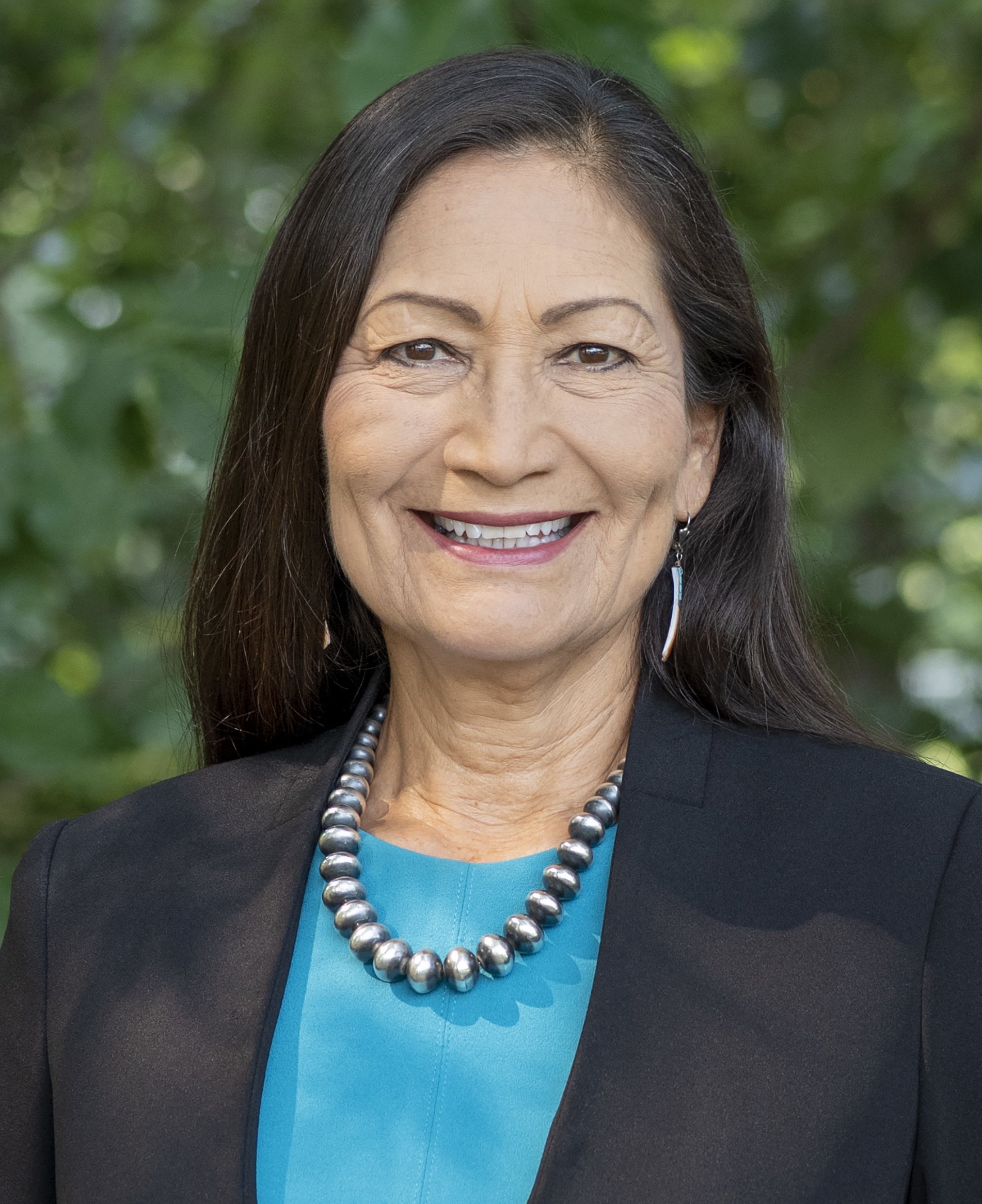
Deb Haaland
Secretary of the Interior
(announced December 17)

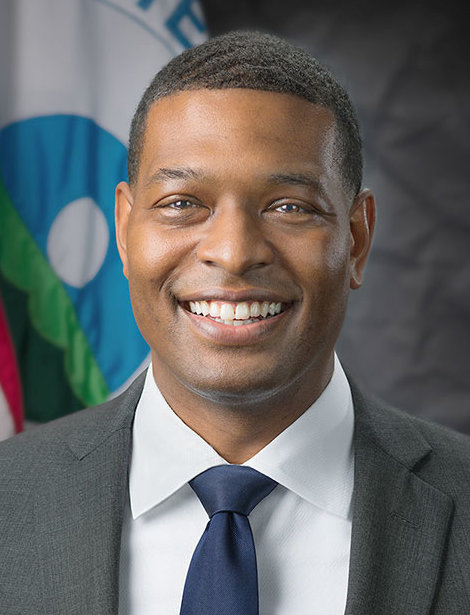
Michael S. Regan
Administrator of the EPA
(announced December 17)

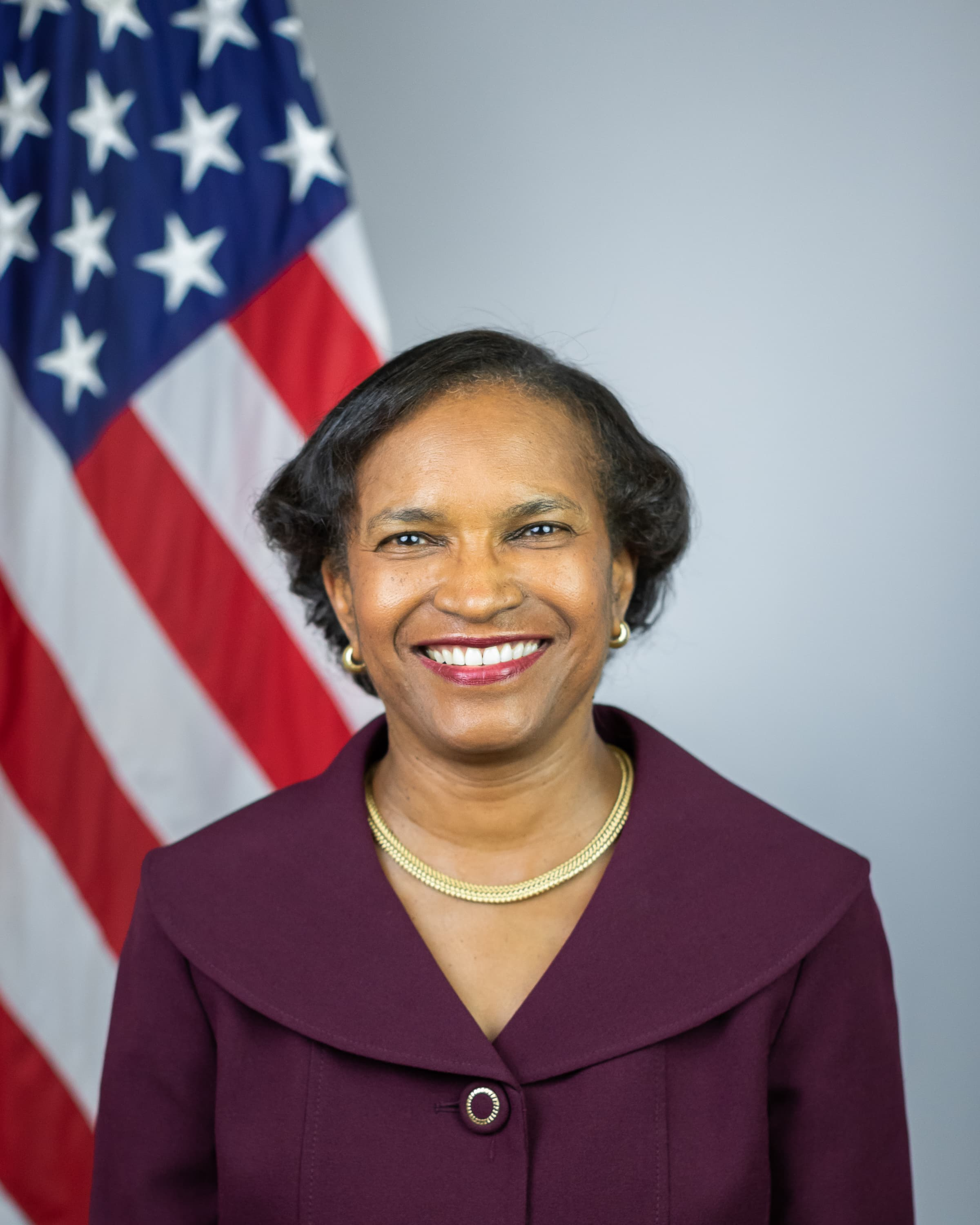
Brenda Mallory
Chair of the Council on Environmental Quality
(announced December 17)

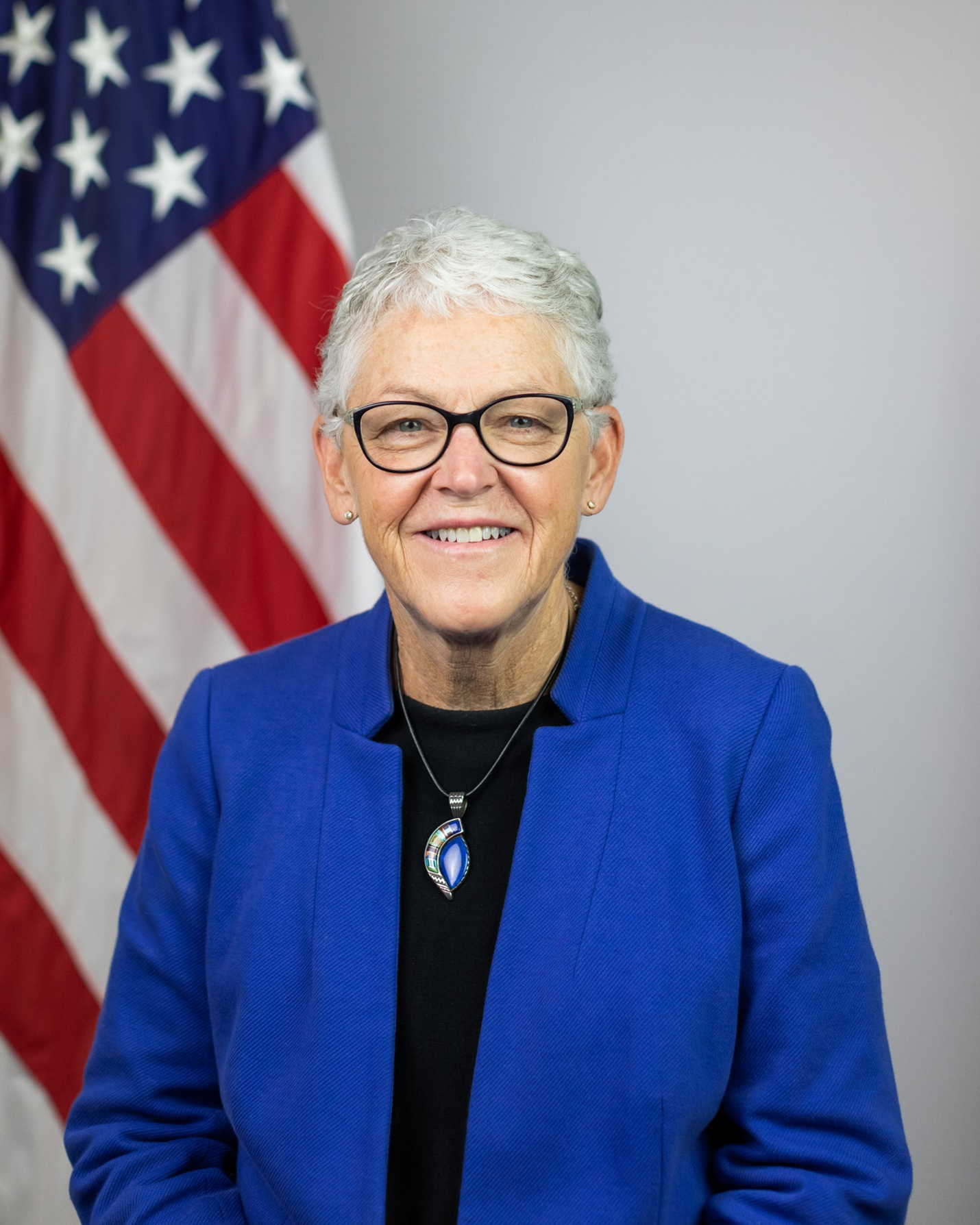
Gina McCarthy
White House Climate Advisor
(announced December 17)

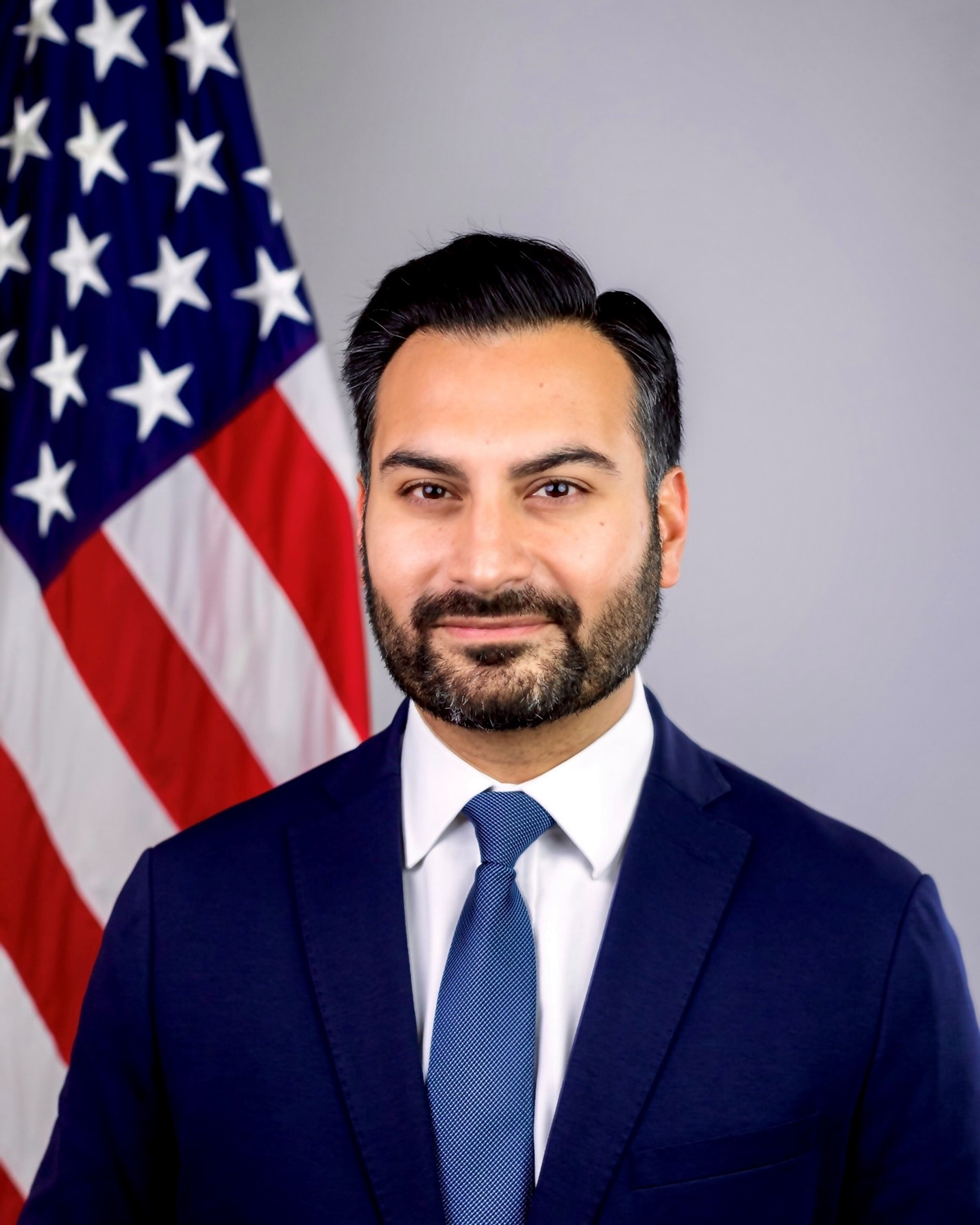
Ali Zaidi
Deputy White House Climate Advisor
(announced December 17)

==== Foreign affairs and national security ====
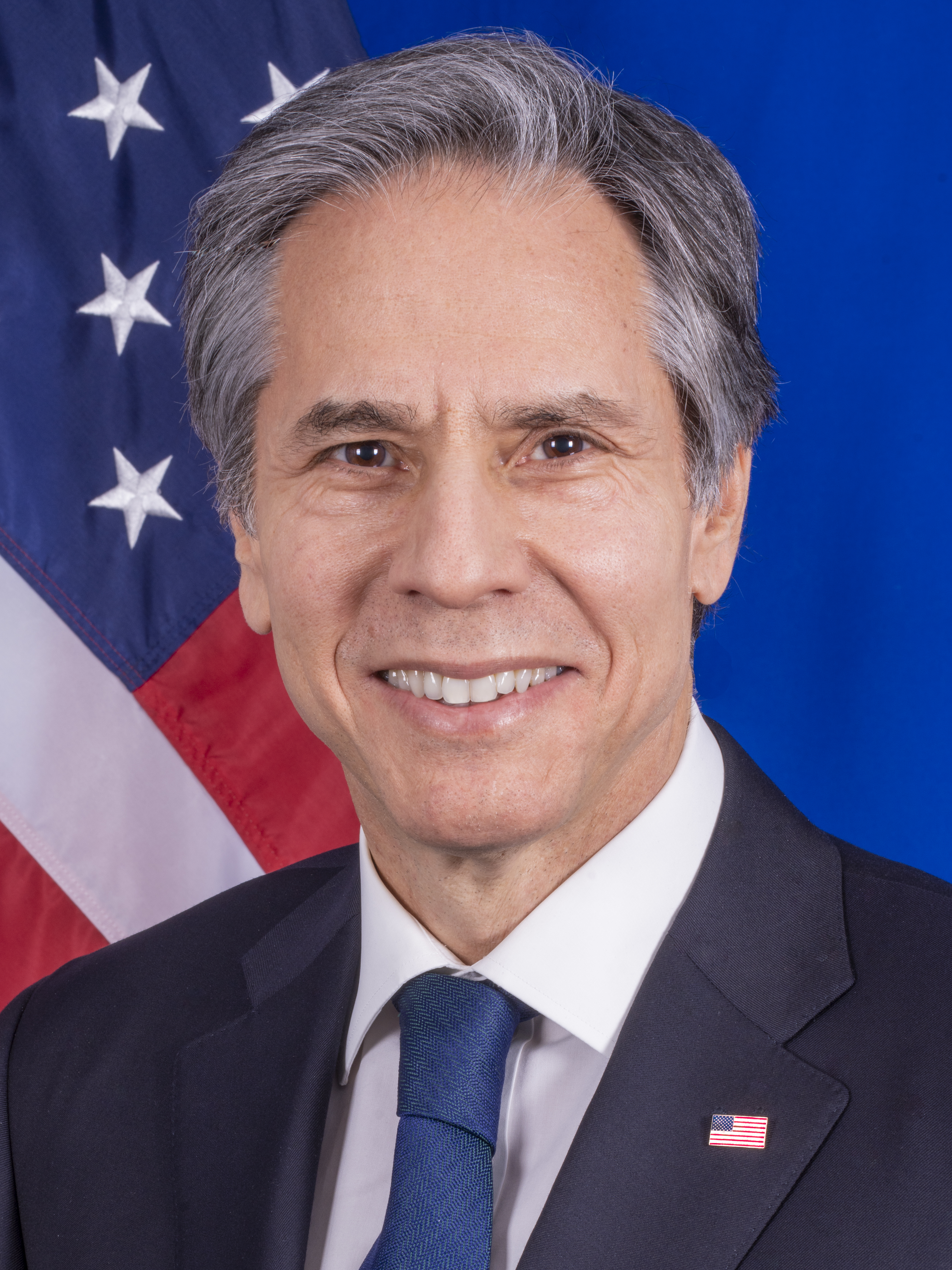
Antony Blinken
Secretary of State
(announced November 24)

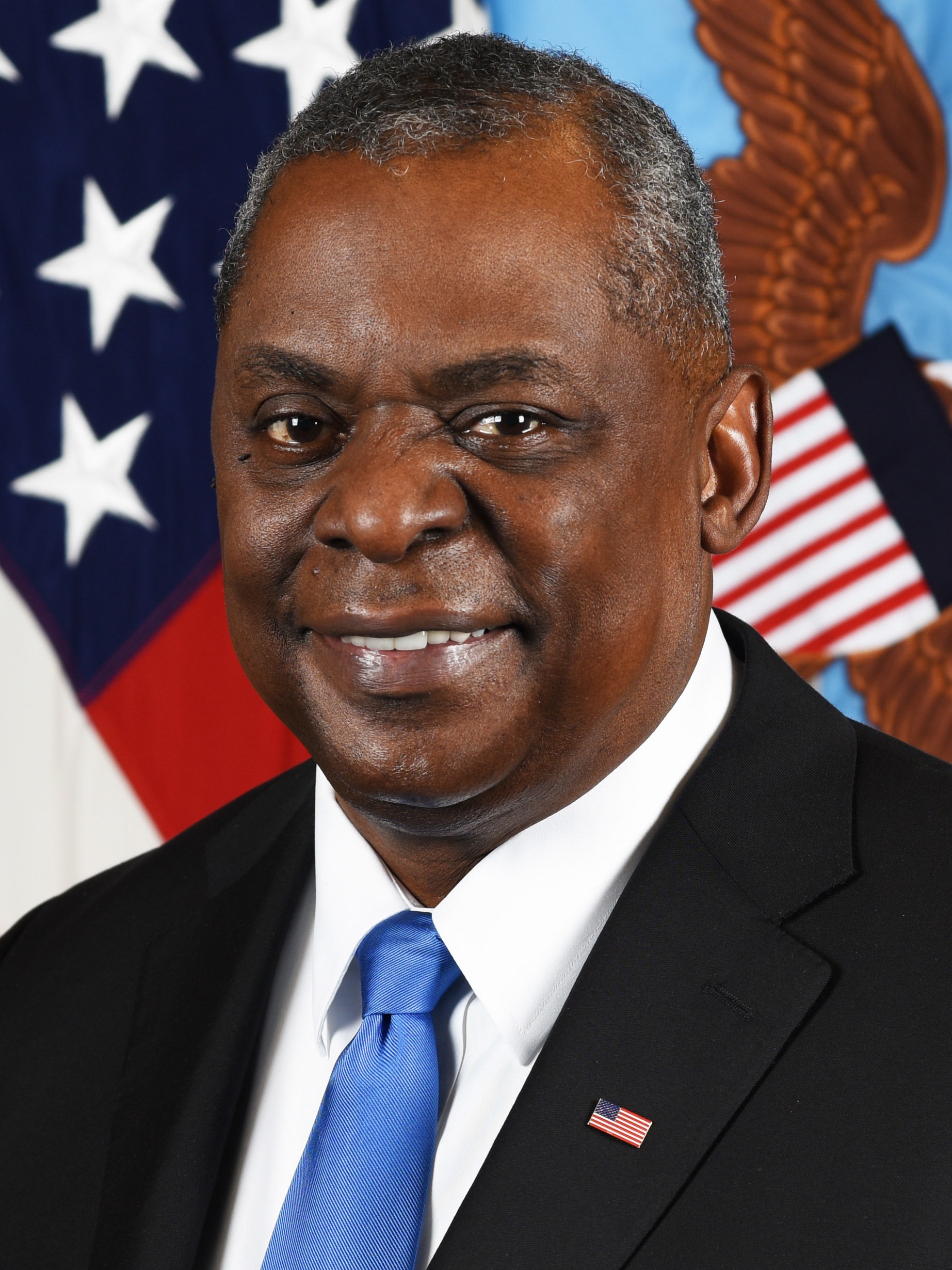
Lloyd Austin
Secretary of Defense
(announced December 8)

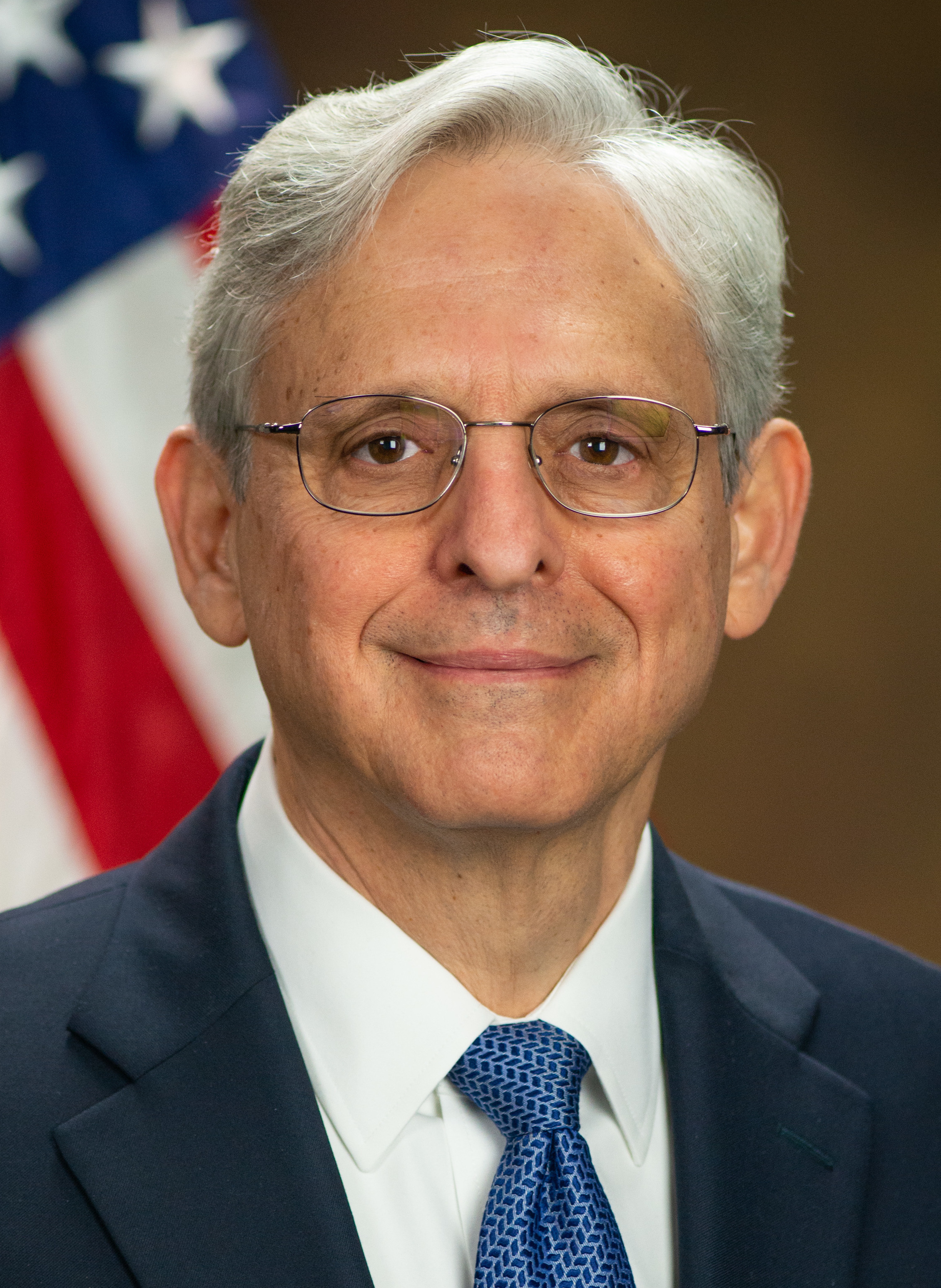
Merrick Garland
Attorney General
(announced January 7)

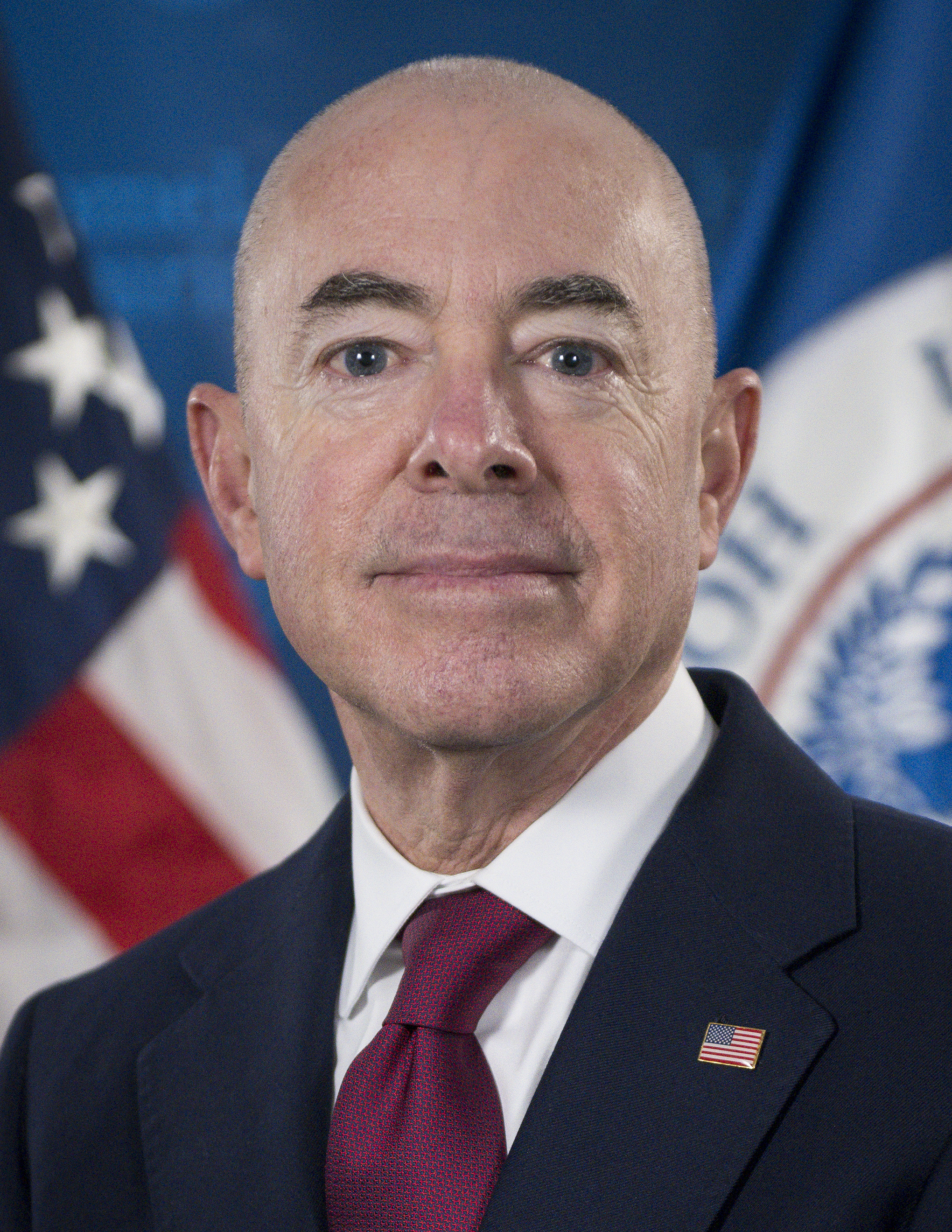
Alejandro Mayorkas
Secretary of Homeland Security
(announced November 24)

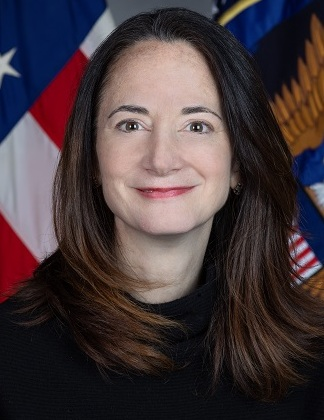
Avril Haines
Director of National Intelligence
(announced November 24)

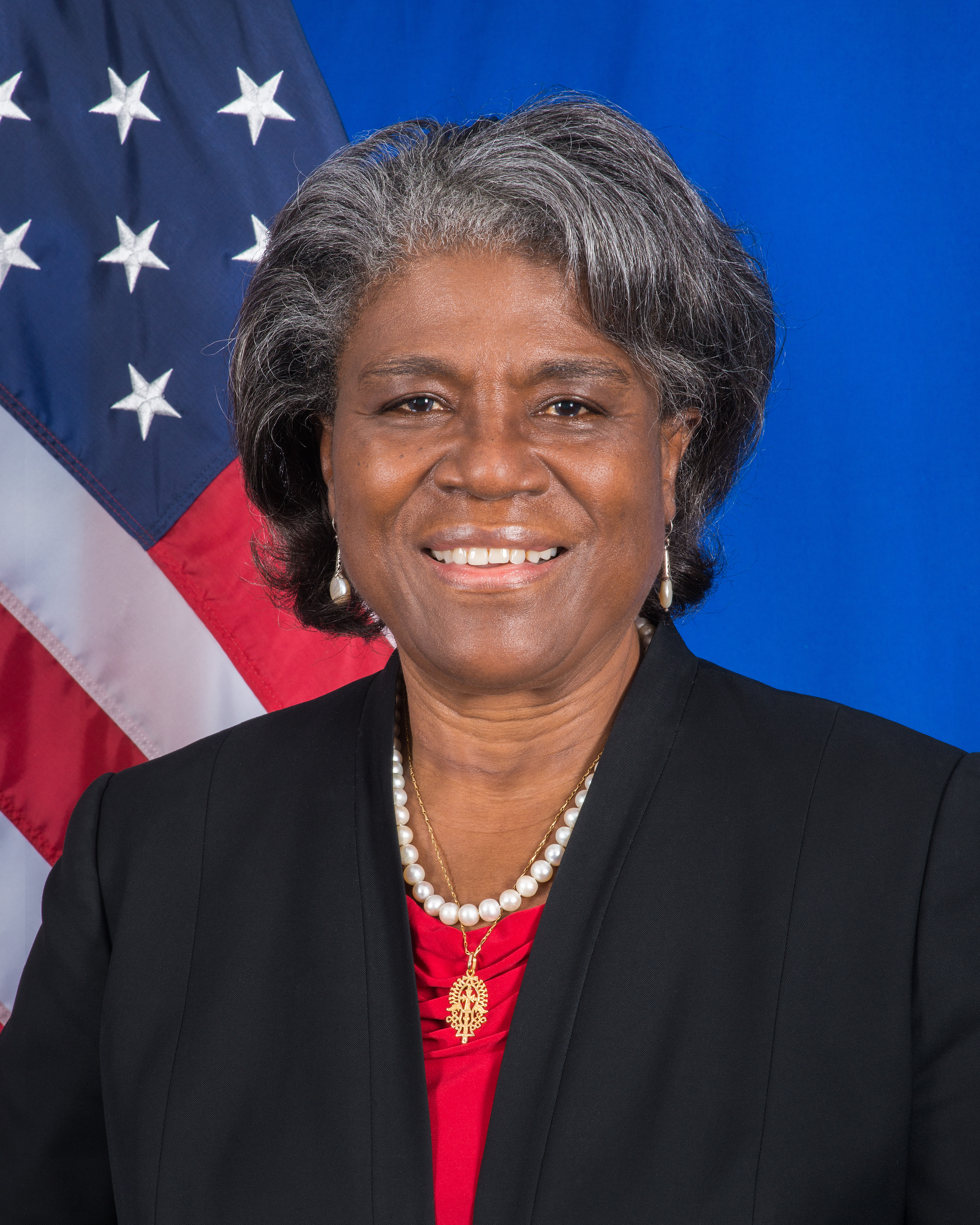
Linda Thomas-Greenfield
U.S. Ambassador to the United Nations
(announced November 24)

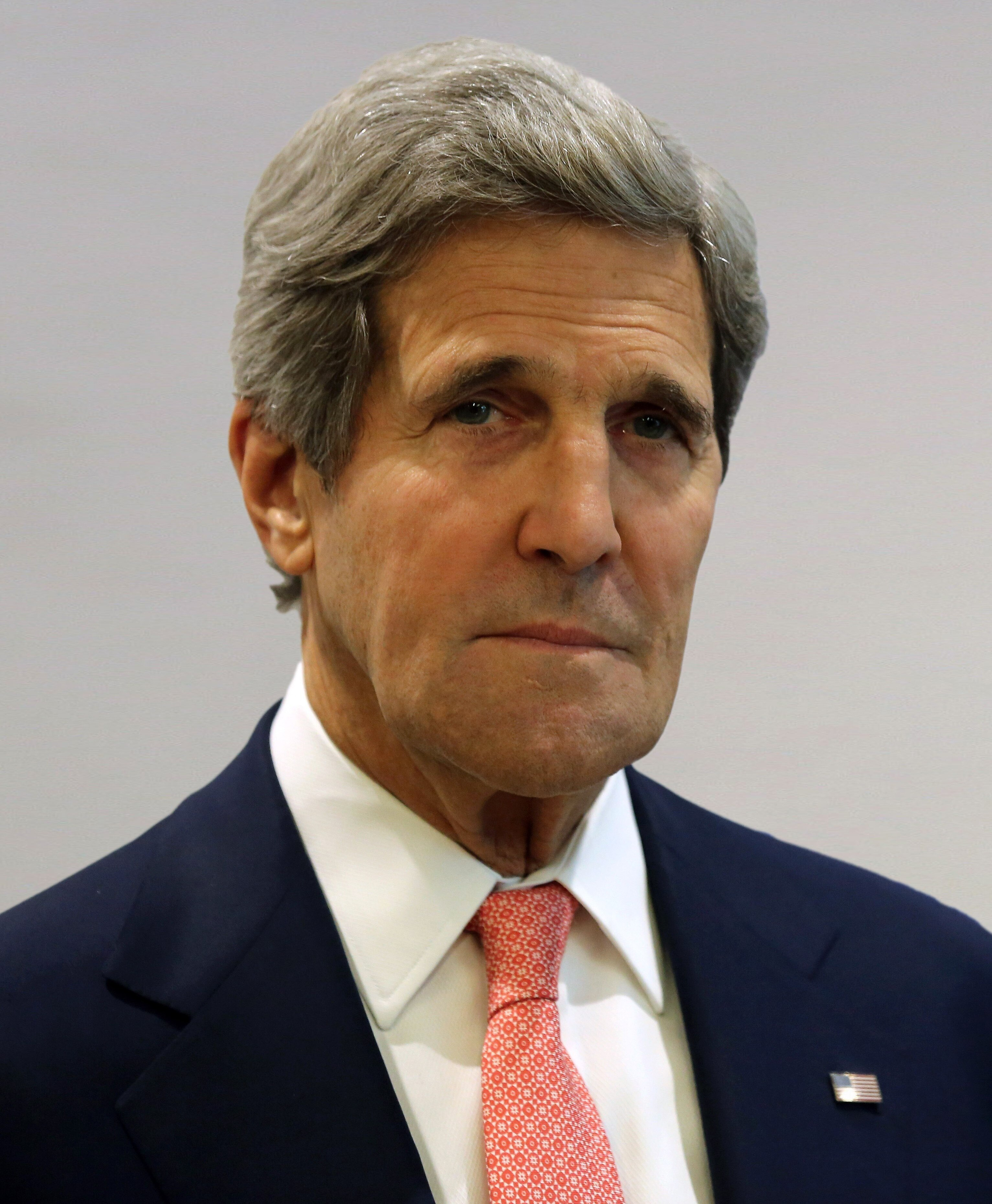
John Kerry
U.S. Special Presidential Envoy for Climate
(announced November 24)

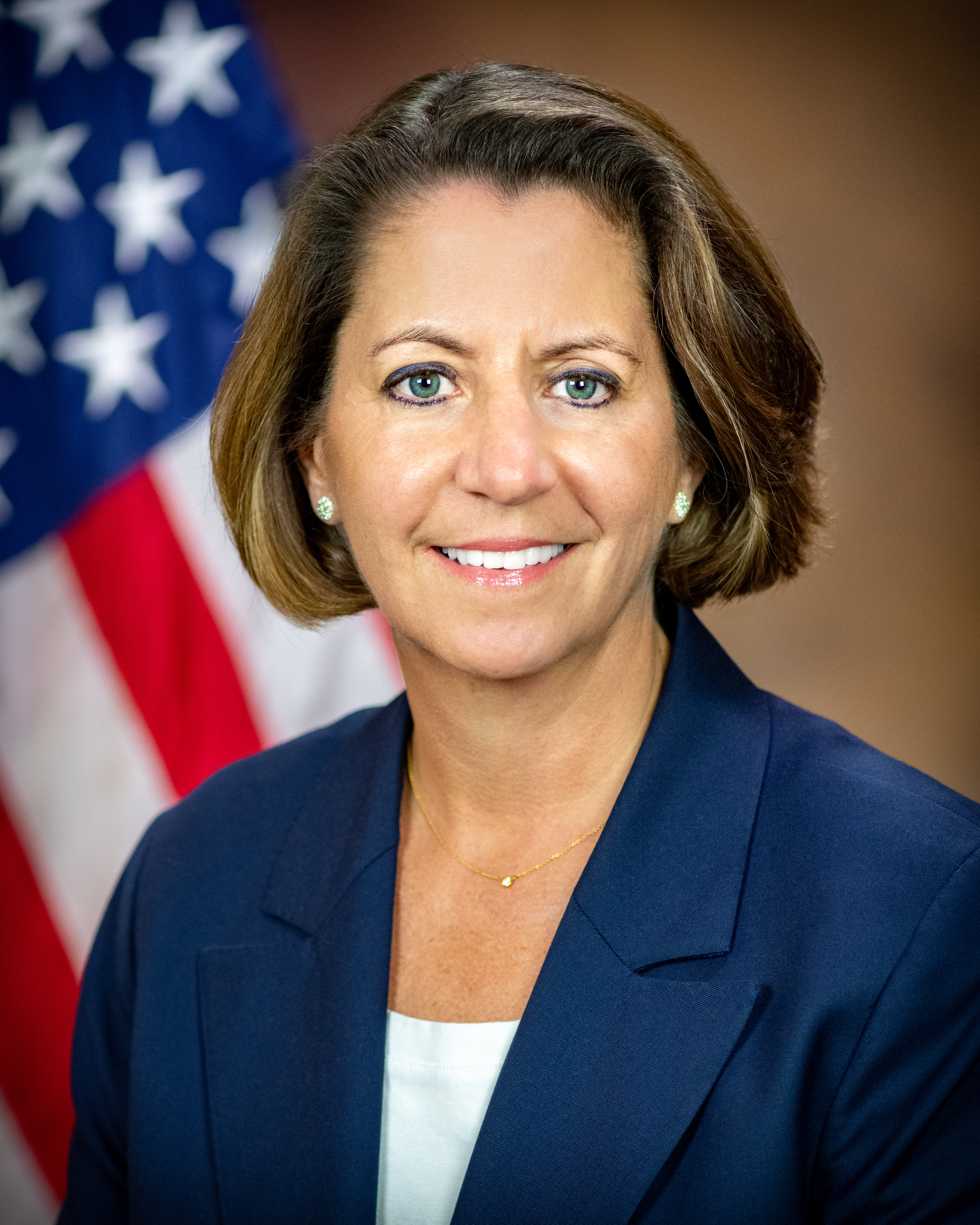
Lisa Monaco
Deputy Attorney General
(announced January 7)

==== Health policy ====
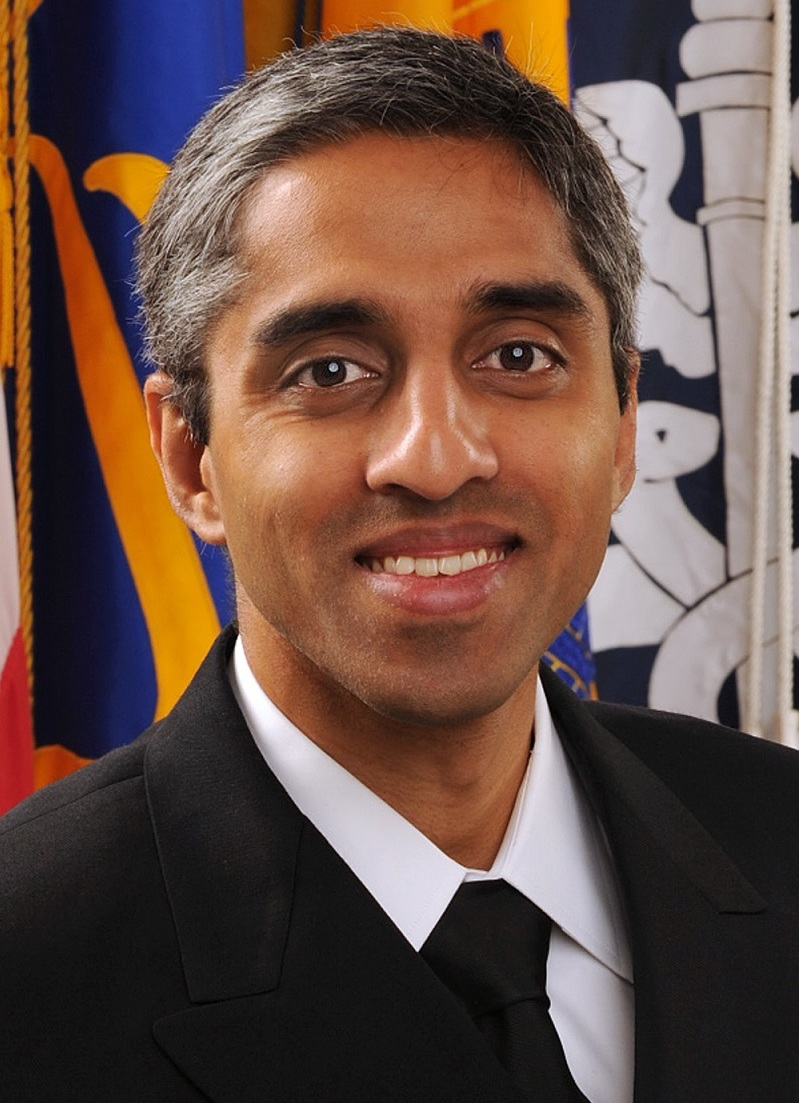
Dr. Vivek Murthy
Surgeon General
(announced December 7)

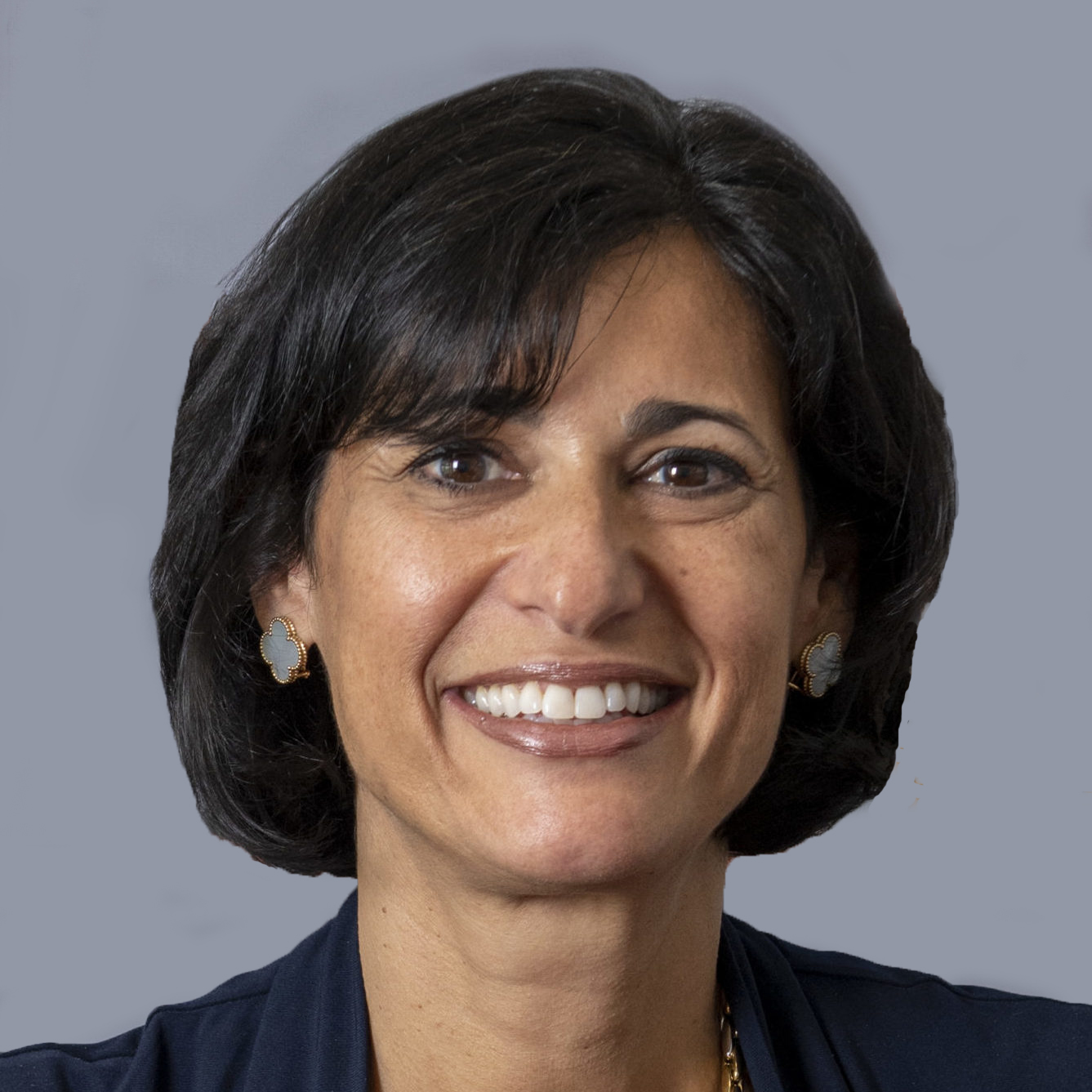
Dr. Rochelle Walensky
Director of the Centers for Disease Control and Prevention
(announced December 7)

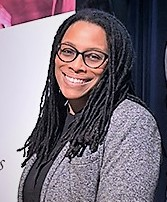
Dr. Marcella Nunez-Smith
Chair of the COVID-19 Equity Task Force
(announced December 7)

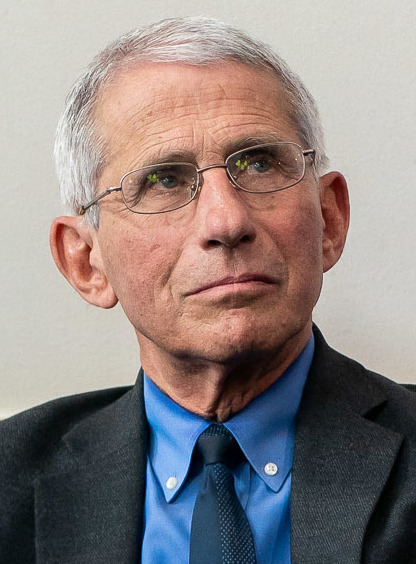
Dr. Anthony Fauci
Chief Medical Advisor to the President
(announced December 7)

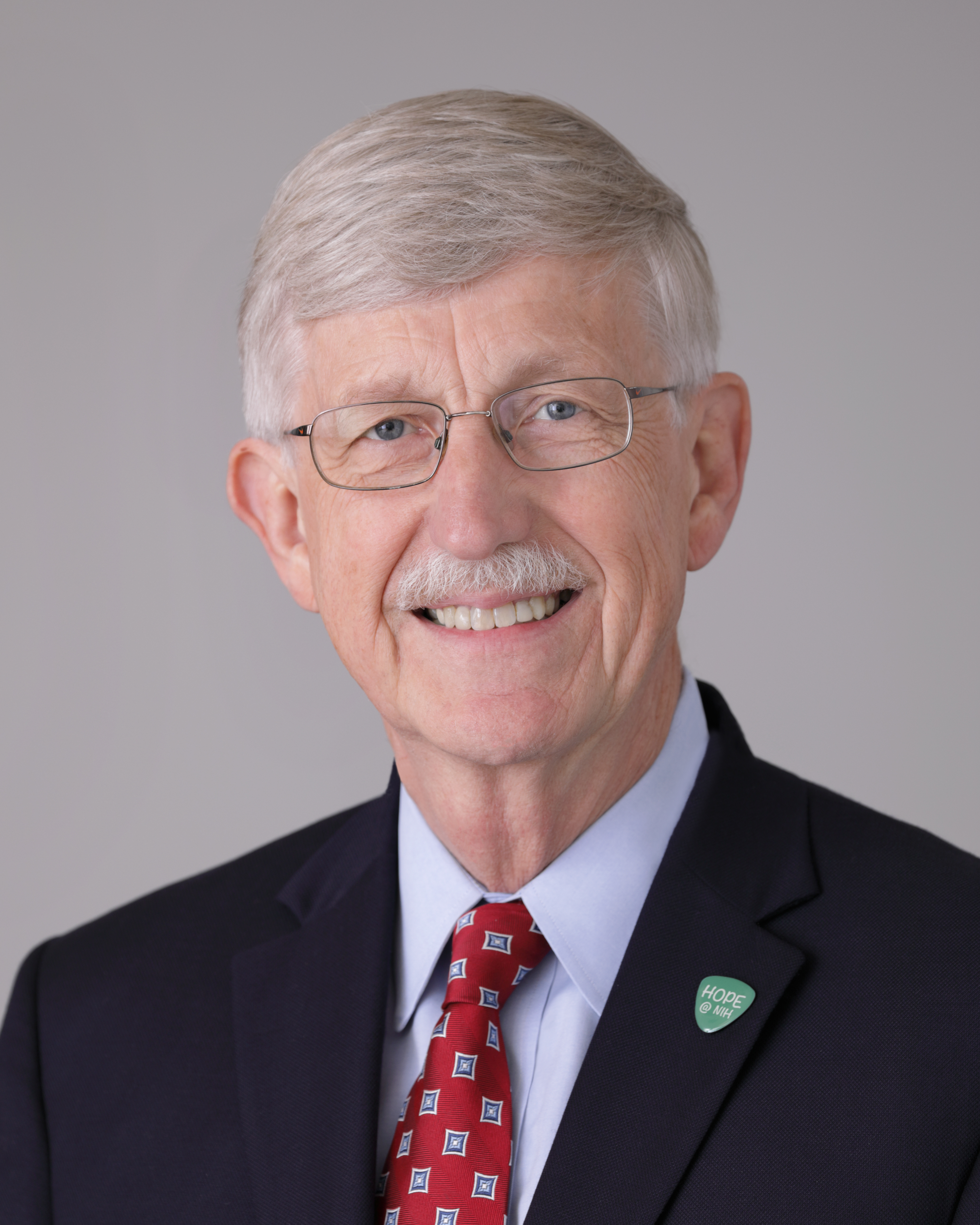
Dr. Francis Collins
Director of the National Institutes of Health
(announced January 16)

==== Science and technology policy ====
Bhavya Lal was appointed as the Acting Chief of Staff for NASA at the White House.

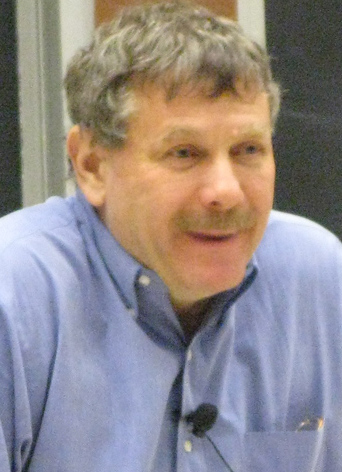
Dr. Eric Lander
Director of the Office of Science and Technology Policy
(announced January 16)

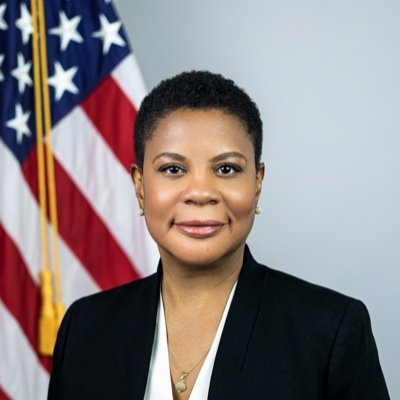
Dr. Alondra Nelson
Deputy Director for science and society of the Office of Science and Technology Policy
(announced January 16)

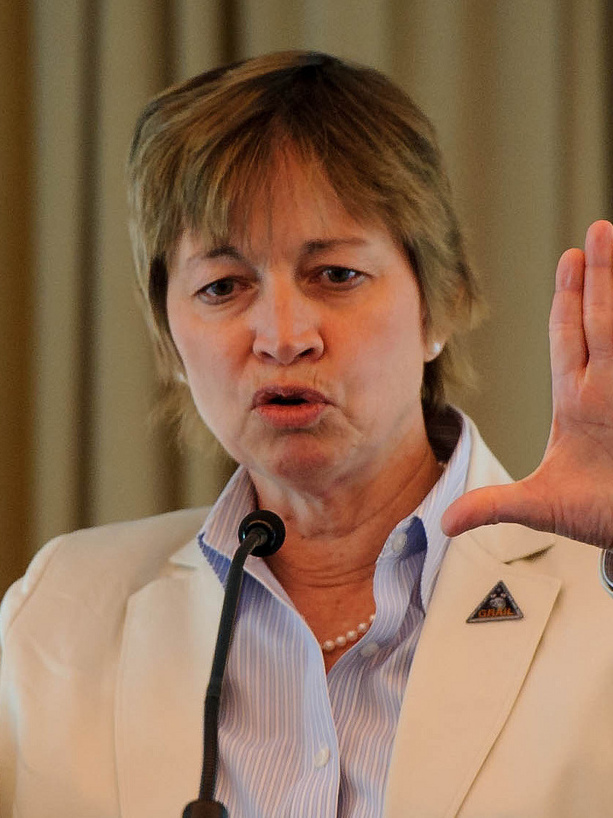
Dr. Maria Zuber
Co-chair of the President’s Council of Advisors on Science and Technology
(announced January 16)

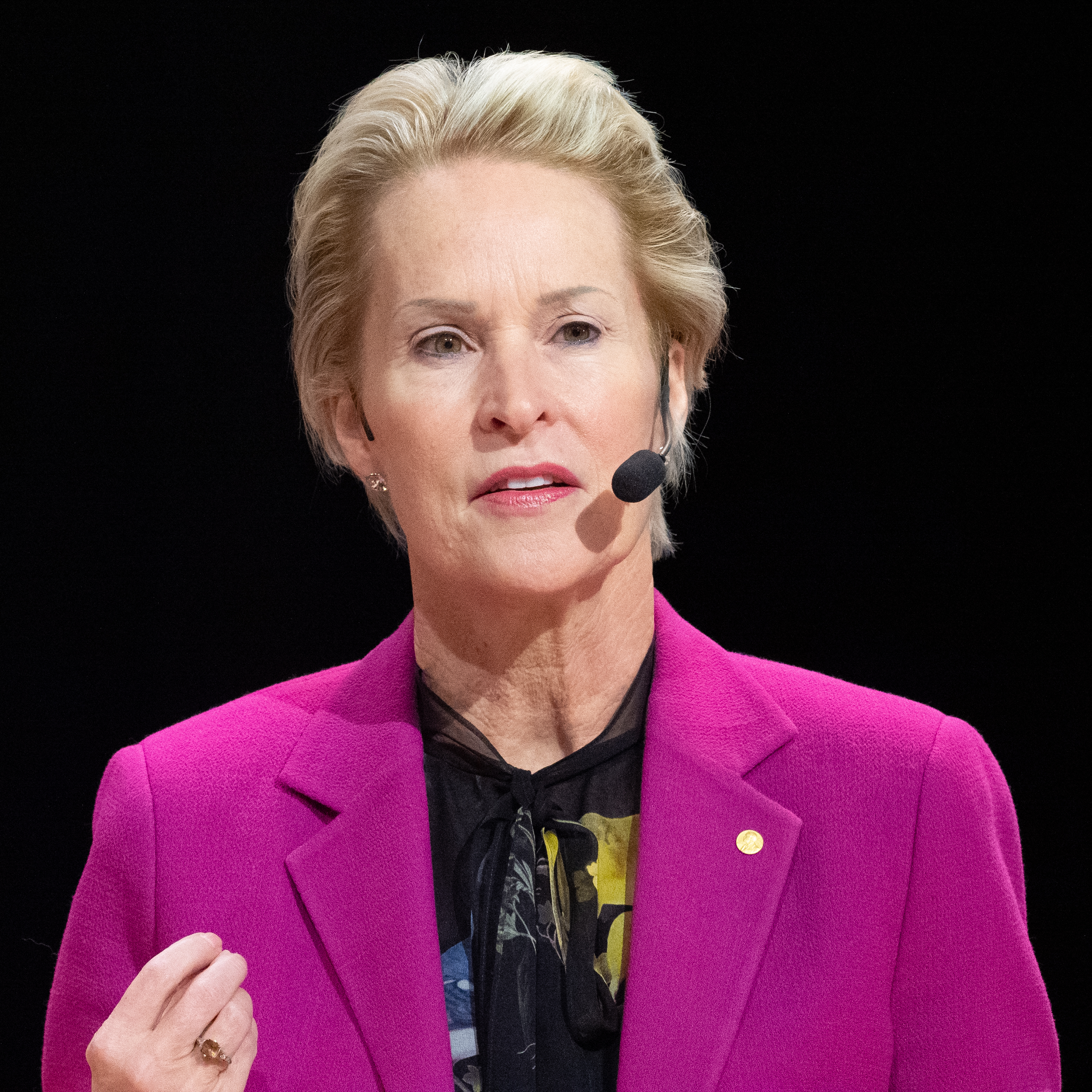
Dr. Frances Arnold
Co-chair of the President’s Council of Advisors on Science and Technology
(announced January 16)

=== Department of Defense ===
There was a great deal of resistance to Biden staffers by Trump appointees, and not much cooperation. Then on December 18, acting Defense Secretary Chris Miller said in a statement that the transition team had agreed to a two-week pause in discussions over the December holiday period. This was news to the Biden transition team, who immediately said they had not agreed to any such thing.

=== Planned executive orders and guidelines ===
President-elect Joe Biden plans on signing several executive orders after being sworn into office on January 20, 2021. His planned executive orders include:

- Rejoining the Paris Agreement
- Reversing President Trump's planned withdrawal from the World Health Organization
- Reinstating the Deferred Action for Childhood Arrivals program
- Repealing Presidential Proclamation 9983 and the Presidential Memorandum on Military Service by Transgender Individuals
- Barring anyone in his administration from influencing any United States Justice Department investigations
- Instituting new ethics guidelines at the White House
- Freezing so-called midnight regulations that have not taken place by January 20

In addition to these executive orders, President-elect Biden plans to issue a large number of executive orders on day one relating to climate change, and cancel several health care policies put in place by the Trump administration including Medicaid work requirements, short-term health plans, Obamacare funding cuts, Title X abortion referral restrictions, and the Mexico City Policy, as well as reinstating Planned Parenthood funding and restoring LGBTQ regulations. President-elect Biden also stated he would urge all Americans to wear a mask for the first 100 days of his presidency in an effort to curb the COVID-19 pandemic.

== Transition team ==
Except for those noted, the transition team was announced on September 5.

=== Co-chairs ===
- Anita Dunn, former acting White House communications director
- Ted Kaufman (announced June 20, 2020), former United States senator from Delaware
- Michelle Lujan Grisham, incumbent governor of New Mexico
- Cedric Richmond, incumbent United States representative from Louisiana
- Jeffrey Zients, former director of the National Economic Council, former acting director of the Office of Management and Budget, former chief performance officer of the United States

=== Advisory council ===
- Tony Allen, incumbent president of Delaware State University
- Jared Bernstein, economist
- Pete Buttigieg, former mayor of South Bend, Indiana, and 2020 Democratic presidential candidate
- Leslie R. Caldwell, former Assistant Attorney General.
- Mark Gitenstein, former United States ambassador to Romania
- Cecilia Martinez, executive director of the Center for Earth, Energy, and Democracy
- Cindy McCain (announced September 28, 2020), Chair of the McCain Institute for International Leadership Board of Trustees and widow of former United States senator from Arizona and 2008 Republican presidential nominee John McCain
- Bob McDonald, former United States secretary of Veterans Affairs
- Minyon Moore, principal at Dewey Square Group
- Vivek Murthy, former surgeon general of the United States
- Susan Rice, former national security advisor
- Teresa Romero, incumbent president of the United Farm Workers
- Cathy Russell, former ambassador at large for global women's issues
- Lonnie Stephenson, incumbent international president of the International Brotherhood of Electrical Workers
- Felicia Wong, president and CEO of the Roosevelt Institute
- Sally Yates, former acting Attorney General of the United States

=== Staff ===
- Yohannes Abraham, director of day-to-day operations, former staffer in the Obama White House.
- Cecilia Muñoz, former director of the White House Domestic Policy Council under President Obama
- Avril Haines, national security and foreign policy, former principal deputy national security adviser and deputy director of the CIA.
- Suzy George, served as an aide to former secretary of state Madeleine Albright.
- Awenate Cobbina, director of operations, chair of Michigan Economic Development Corporation
- Lisa Monaco, homeland security adviser, homeland security adviser under the Obama administration

== Financing ==
In addition to the roughly $6 million in federal funding the transition received, it raised $22.1 million in private contributions. The Biden transition made $24 million in expenditures.
