= List of Northern Arizona University alumni =

Notable alumni of Northern Arizona University:

== Alumni ==
=== Academia ===
- Valeen Tippetts Avery – historian
- Harvey Butchart – author and professor known for hiking exploits near Grand Canyon
- Aimée Classen – ecologist
- Frederick Colwell – microbial ecologist
- Lattie F. Coor – president of Arizona State University and the University of Vermont
- Elizabeth Hadly – biology professor
- Nellie Shaw Harnar – historian
- Lomayumtewa C. Ishii – Hopi researcher
- Hartman H. Lomawaima – director of the Arizona State Museum
- Randi Martinsen – geologist
- John Marzluff – wildlife professor
- Brad McRae – ecologist
- Katrina Miranda – biochemistry professor
- Raymond R. Rogers – geology professor
- Joseph Shepard – president of Western New Mexico University
- Cathy Small – anthropologist
- William A. Stein – professor and founder of CoCalc
- Lydia Tederick – White House curator
- Kimberly A. With – ecologist
- Evangeline Parsons Yazzie – Navajo educator

=== Actors and television ===
- Rutanya Alda – actress
- Seamus Dever – actor in Castle
- Camille Ford – actress and presenter of Food Wars
- Marjean Holden – actress
- Quentin Oliver Lee – Grammy Award-winning stage actor

=== Artists ===
- R.C. Gorman – Native American artist
- Ted Larsen – sculptor
- Ray Manley – photographer
- R. Carlos Nakai – 11-time Grammy-nominated Native American flutist
- Ryan Singer – artist
- Joe Sorren – painter
- Mary Antonia Wood – artist

=== Business ===
- Richard Bitner – real estate publisher
- Martin Casado – co-founder of Nicira Networks
- Cheryl Casone – Fox Business news anchor
- Robert Maynard Jr. – founder of LifeLock

=== Government and politics ===
- J. Christopher Ackerley – member of the Arizona House of Representatives
- Brent T. Adams – judge, Nevada Second Judicial District Court
- Cesar Aguilar – member of the Arizona House of Representatives
- Andreas Borgeas – member of the California State Senate
- Lisa Callan – member of the Washington House of Representatives
- Chad Campbell – member of the Arizona House of Representatives
- Howard Cannon – U.S. senator from Nevada
- Richard A. Carranza – chancellor of the New York City Department of Education
- Heather Carter – member of the Arizona State Senate
- Raul Hector Castro – 14th governor of Arizona; U.S. ambassador to Argentina, Bolivia, and El Salvador
- Doug Coleman – member of the Arizona House of Representatives
- Charlene Fernandez – Democratic leader of the Arizona House of Representatives
- Carl Gatto – member of the Alaska House of Representatives
- Anthony Hartsook – member of the Colorado House of Representatives
- Theresa Hatathlie – member of the Arizona State Senate
- Katie Hobbs – 24th governor of Arizona
- John Huppenthal – Arizona superintendent, member of the Arizona State Senate
- Jill Jim – member of the COVID-19 Advisory Board
- Anthony Kern – member of the Arizona State Senate
- Jonathan Lines – chairman of the Arizona Republican Party
- Judith Loganbill – member of the Kansas House of Representatives
- Lynda Lovejoy – member of the New Mexico State Senate
- Jonathan Nez – 9th president of the Navajo Nation
- Phefelia Nez – first lady of the Navajo Nation
- Jamescita Peshlakai – member of the Arizona House of Representatives
- Rick Renzi – U.S. representative from Arizona
- Tyrone Thompson – member of the Nevada Assembly
- Myron Tsosie – member of the Arizona House of Representatives
- Dennis Van Roekel – labor leader

=== Literature ===
- C. Dean Andersson – fantasy author
- Dia Cha – author
- Diana Gabaldon – author of the Outlander series
- Paul Genesse – fantasy author
- Kevin Hearne – author of The Iron Druid Chronicles series
- Carlton Mellick III – absurdist author
- Todd Robert Petersen – fiction writer
- Jennifer Roberson – fantasy author

=== Military ===
- Robin Braun – United States Navy rear admiral
- Jay R. Vargas – United States Marine Corps Medal of Honor recipient

=== Science and engineering ===
- Philip Johnston – code talker
- David Mangelsdorf – pharmacologist, chemist
- Michael Reeves – YouTuber and roboticist
- Tajana Rosing – computer engineer

=== Sports ===
- Greg Adams – National Hockey League
- Geordie Beamish – New Zealand long-distance runner
- Travis Brown – National Football League, quarterback
- Dave Cahill – National Football League, defensive tackle
- Darren Carrington – National Football League, safety
- Víctor Castillo – Venezuelan long jumper
- Allan Clark – National Football League, running back
- Shawn Collins – National Football League, wide receiver
- Diego Estrada – Mexican-American long-distance runner
- Casey Frank – American-New Zealand professional basketball player
- George Grantham – Major League Baseball, infielder
- Luis Grijalva – Guatemalan-American long-distance runner
- Tim Handel – German tennis player
- Michael Haynes – National Football League, wide receiver
- Mike Jankowski – skiing and snowboarding coach
- Maya Kalle-Bentzur – Israeli Olympic runner and long jumper
- Tara Koleski – soccer player
- David Lang – National Football League, running back
- Jeff Lewis – National Football League, quarterback
- Goran Lingmerth – National Football League, kicker
- Mark Lomas – National Football League, defensive lineman
- Lopez Lomong – South Sudanese-born track and field athlete and Olympian
- Peter Lomong – long-distance runner
- Pete Mandley – National Football League, wide receiver
- Derek Mason – current defensive coordinator for Auburn Tigers
- Todd McMillon – National Football League, cornerback
- Mike Mercer – National Football League
- Rex Mirich – National Football League, defensive tackle
- Samantha Monahan – professional soccer player
- Lee Mulleneaux – National Football League
- Abdihamid Nur – Somolian-born American long-distance runner
- Keith O'Neil – National Football League linebacker, Super Bowl XLI champion with Indianapolis Colts
- Josh Oppenheimer – Israeli-American professional basketball coach, and former professional basketball player
- Eleanor Pilgrim – Welsh professional golfer
- Frank Pollack – offensive tackle, San Francisco 49ers
- John Rade – National Football League, linebacker
- Claire Robertson – beach volleyball player
- Seton Sobolewski – college basketball coach
- Andre Spencer (1964–2020) – basketball player
- Brian Stewart – National Football League and college coach
- Rayna Stewart – National Football League, safety
- Francis St. Paul – football player
- Cathy Thaxton-Tippett – rower
- Rusty Tillman – National Football League, linebacker
- Andy Trouard – long-distance runner
- Nico Young – long-distance runner
- Kasandra Vegas – Samoan discus thrower
- Futsum Zienasellassie – long-distance runner

=== Other ===
- Latif – Saudi Arabian gamer
- Kayla Mueller – humanitarian and Islamic State hostage
- Lisa Olson – sports journalist

== Notable faculty ==
- Harvey Butchart – mathematics
- Lomayumtewa C. Ishii – Hopi researcher
- Cathy Small – anthropology
- Gordon Swann – astrogeology (adjunct professor)
- Clyde Tombaugh – astronomer and discoverer of Pluto
- Chad Trujillo – astronomer and co-discoverer of Eris and Sedna
