= Céline Gounder =

Physician and journalist (born 1977)

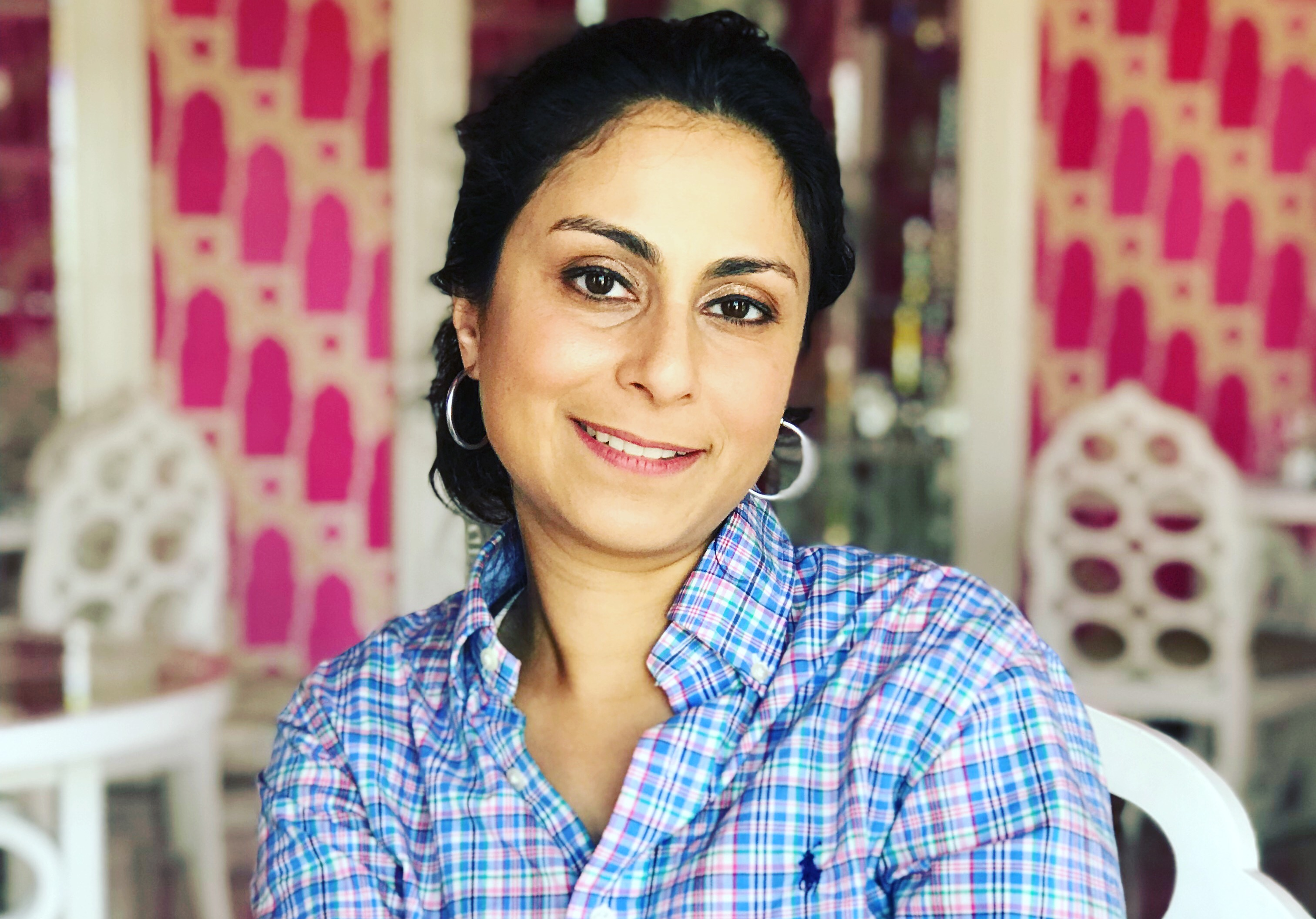
- Gounder in August 2018

Member of the COVID-19 Advisory Board
- In office November 2020 – January 2021
- President-Elect: Joe Biden
- Co-chairs: David A. Kessler; Vivek Murthy; Marcella Nunez-Smith

Personal details
- Born: Céline R. Gounder; April 22, 1977 (age 49) United States
- Spouse: Grant Wahl (m. 2001; died 2022)
- Education: Princeton University; Johns Hopkins University; University of Washington
- Occupation: Physician, medical journalist
- Website: celinegounder.com

Céline R. Gounder (born April 22, 1977) is an American physician and medical journalist who specializes in infectious diseases and global health. She was a member of the COVID-19 Advisory Board transition team of then-incoming U.S. president Joe Biden.

In 2022, Gounder joined the Kaiser Family Foundation as a senior fellow and editor-at-large for public health at KFF Health News. Currently, she is also a medical correspondent for CBS News.

== Early life ==
Céline R. Gounder was born in the United States on April 22, 1977, the daughter of a French mother, Nicole Pantanelli, from Normandy, and Raj Natarajan Gounder, a Tamil-Indian father from Perumpalayam, near Erode in the Indian state of Tamil Nadu.

At age 16, Gounder began attending Princeton University, graduating in 1997 with a Bachelor of Arts degree in molecular biology. In 2000, she received a Master of Science degree in epidemiology from Johns Hopkins Bloomberg School of Public Health, with a thesis titled "Field evaluation of a rapid immunochromatographic test for tuberculosis". She earned her Doctor of Medicine degree from the University of Washington School of Medicine in 2004.

While attending medical school, Gounder co-founded the International Health Group, which advocates for doctors who are training to serve disadvantaged people around the world. She completed her residency in internal medicine at Massachusetts General Hospital.

== Career ==
Gounder's first position was as a post-doctoral fellow at Johns Hopkins Bloomberg School of Public Health, where she researched tuberculosis (TB) and HIV in sub-Saharan Africa and served as Director for Delivery in the Consortium to Respond Effectively to the AIDS/TB Epidemic, which was funded by the Gates Foundation. She then joined the New York City Department of Health and Mental Hygiene working on control of TB in the city.

Starting in 2018, Gounder practiced medicine part-time while addressing her long-time concerns with health issues as a medical journalist. She was on the editorial advisory board of TEDMED as of March 1, 2018, has published articles about infectious disease and other medical topics in media outlets, including The New Yorker and The Atlantic, and has appeared on TV news and talk shows.

In 2017, Gounder founded Just Human Productions, a nonprofit media organization that uses storytelling to impact public health. Gounder produced the podcast American Diagnosis, focusing on diverse health topics. With the rise of COVID-19, she created the podcast Epidemic, which she cohosted with Biden Administration advisor Ron Klain.

On November 9, 2020, Gounder was named as a member of the COVID-19 Advisory Board of U.S. President-elect Joe Biden.

As of 2021, Gounder is also an assistant professor at the NYU medical school.

== Recognition ==
While pursuing her master's degree at Johns Hopkins, Gounder was inducted into the Delta Omega Public Health Honor Society in 2000. In 2004 when she graduated from University of Washington School of Medicine, she was awarded the James W. Haviland Award for "outstanding clinical competence and for unusual promise as a leader of medicine in the future". In 2010, she was awarded the W. Leight Thompson, MD Excellence in Research Award at Johns Hopkins. Also that year, she was the recipient of the Arthur M. Dannenberg, Jr. Award at Johns Hopkins, and was an Ashoka Changemaker Finalist.

In 2017, Gounder was listed in People Magazine's 25 Women Changing the World in 2017 for her contributions to health care.

Gounder was elected a fellow of the Infectious Diseases Society of America in 2016 and elected to the National Academy of Medicine in 2023. Since 2025, she has also been appointed a board member of Research America.

== Personal life ==
Gounder was married to sports journalist Grant Wahl from 2001 until his sudden death in 2022. They lived with their two dogs in New York City.
