= List of people from Flagstaff, Arizona =

This is a listing of notable people who were born in, or have lived in, Flagstaff, Arizona. People whose only association with Flagstaff is attending, playing at, or coaching at Northern Arizona University should not be listed. For people who attended NAU, see List of Northern Arizona University alumni.

== Arts and entertainment ==
- Rutanya Alda – actress (originally from Riga, Latvia, grew up in Flagstaff)
- Avery Anna – country singer
- Ted Danson – actor (originally from San Diego, California)
- Andy Devine – actor
- R. Carlos Nakai – Native American flutist
- James Neilson – director (originally from Shreveport, Louisiana
- Katie Pavlich – journalist, author (originally from Phoenix, Arizona)

== Literature ==
- Harvey Butchart – author, mathematician
- Ann Cummins – author (originally from Durango, Colorado)
- Diana Gabaldon – author (originally from Scottsdale, Arizona)

== Military ==
- Amir Mirza Hekmati – U.S. Marine held prisoner by Iran in 2011 after allegations that he spied while visiting his grandmother
- Thomas Jones Thorp – Union Army officer, namesake of Flagstaff's Thorpe Park

== Politics ==
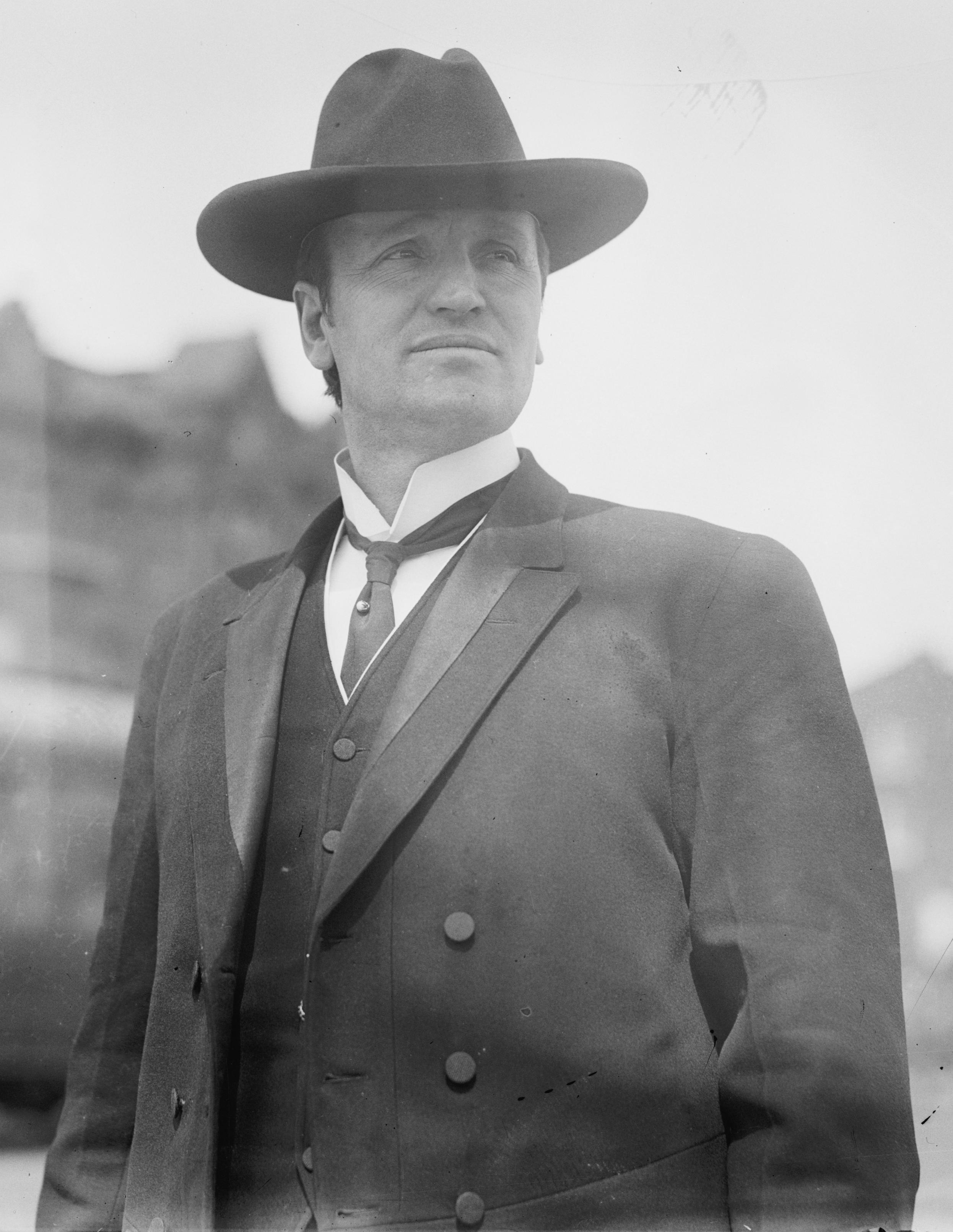
Henry Fountain Ashurst

- Henry F. Ashurst – one of Arizona's first two senators (originally from Winnemucca, Nevada)
- Bruce Babbitt – former governor, and former United States Secretary of the Interior
- Paul Gosar – House of Representatives (originally from Rock Springs, Wyoming)
- Ann Kirkpatrick – House of Representatives (originally from McNary, Arizona)
- Ned Norris Jr. – chairman of the Tohono O'odham Nation
- Adam Perez Diaz – first Hispanic to serve as vice mayor of Phoenix
- Rick Renzi – House of Representatives (originally from Fort Monmouth, New Jersey)
- John Verkamp – state representative (originally from Grand Canyon Village, Arizona)

== Science and medicine ==
- William J. Breed – geologist, paleontologist, naturalist, author (originally from Massillon, Ohio)
- Robert Burnham Jr. – astronomer who worked at the Lowell Observatory
- Edwin H. Colbert – paleontologist, author (originally from Clarinda, Iowa)
- Grady Gammage – educator, president of ASU and NAU (originally from Prescott, Arkansas)
- E. S. Gosney – eugenicist (originally from Kenton County, Kentucky)
- Percival Lowell – astronomer, businessman, author (originally from Boston, Massachusetts)
- Harold Masursky – geologist, astronomer (originally from Fort Wayne, Indiana)
- Dale Shewalter – educator, outdoorsman (originally from Geneva, Illinois)
- Eugene Merle Shoemaker – geologist, one of the founders of the field of planetary science, co-discoverer of Comet Shoemaker–Levy 9 (originally from Los Angeles, California)
- Earl C. Slipher – astronomer, mayor of Flagstaff (originally from Mulberry, Indiana)
- Vesto Slipher – astronomer (originally from Mulberry, Indiana)
- Gordon Swann – geologist who trained Apollo 14 and Apollo 15 astronauts – the asteroid 4082 Swann is named after him (originally from Palisade, Colorado)
- Clyde Tombaugh – astronomer, discoverer of Pluto (originally from Streator, Illinois)

== Sports ==
- Lyza Bosselmann – professional soccer player
- Donnie Hickman – professional football player
- Kyle Lobstein – professional baseball pitcher
- Eric McCain – professional football player
- Max Settlage – pair figure skater (originally from Thừa Thiên–Huế Province, Vietnam)
