= Eric Schulz =

American professor

Eric Dean Schulz
- Born: 1957 (age 68–69)
- Education: Marriott School of Business (1987); Brigham Young University (1981)
- Occupations: Author, Marketing Professor, Consultant
- Known for: Managing Coca-Cola global sponsorship of 1996 Summer Olympics being the director of worldwide Olympic marketing
- Title: Senior Lecturer on marketing at Jon M. Huntsman School of Business (Utah State University); Advisory board member of Bubbleball Inc.
- Website: www.ericschulz.com

Eric Schulz (born 1957) is an American expert in marketing management and sport management expert, a faculty member at the Jon M. Huntsman School of Business at Utah State University, and the author of three books on marketing.

== Biography ==
=== Early life ===
Eric Schulz was born in 1957. During his youth, he played baseball and basketball. In 1974, while attending Orem High School, he participated in a 45-hour basketball game that set a world record for the longest basketball marathon. This achievement was documented in the 1974 edition of the Guinness Book of Records. After graduating from Orem High School in 1976, Schulz studied political science at Brigham Young University in Provo, Utah, earning a BA degree in 1981.

=== Business career ===
After college he went to work as a marketing intern for the Utah Jazz working in their Salt Lake City and Las Vegas offices. In October 1982, he became the marketing director of the Salt Lake City Gulls, minor league baseball club, and in 1983 was named general manager of the Redwood Pioneers, a minor league baseball team in the California League, an affiliate of California Angels. There he hired Ken Korach sports commentator into his first baseball play-by-play job, secured radio broadcast agreement with KSRO radio in Santa Rosa, CA and arranged several events to increase game attendance including firework displays, music concerts and giveaways.

In 1985 Schulz returned to his alma mater Brigham Young University to complete his MBA at the Marriott School of Business (1987).

In June 1987 Schulz started his career at Procter & Gamble in the Food & Beverage Division and within 5 years advanced from brand assistant for Citrus Hill juice brand team to Hawaiian Punch brand manager. He joined P&G's "Invention Team" led by Doug Hall and launched new products for Folgers Coffee, Duncan Hines and Hawaiian Punch. Working together they developed a Rapid Test that reduced new product concept testing time significantly, reporting results from 5 cities in 7 days. Schulz was also part of the team working on Citrus Hill package redesign that resulted in adding pouring spout to the carton (that later became a standard for packaged juices).

From 1992 to 1994 Schulz worked as senior brand manager at Buena Vista Home Entertainment. He was responsible for the home video marketing and helped develop Disney's first direct-to-video release The Return of Jafar (1994).

In July 1994, he joined The Coca-Cola Company as Director of Worldwide Olympic Marketing and managed various Olympic events during the 1996 Summer Olympics including Olympic Torch Relay, Coca-Cola Olympic City theme park in Atlanta as well as Olympic advertising.

He became Vice President of Marketing for Feld Entertainment. In January 1997, Schulz moved to Special Olympics International and in November 1999 became Vice President of Event Marketing for the initial launch of the XFL Football League. In 1999, he published his first book on marketing The Marketing Game: How the World's Best Companies Play to Win.

In May 2005, he rejoined the Utah Jazz as Vice President of Marketing, where he launched several new initiatives including an integrated social media portal, NBA's first fan-based blogger network, the “Utah Jazzbots", variable ticket pricing, a contest to find a new team theme song, interactive TV test and a fan club called “Jazz Rowdies”.

=== Career in education ===
In July, 2011, Schulz began teaching at the Jon M. Huntsman School of Business at Utah State University as a senior lecturer and director. In 2011, he developed the first mass-student texting service at the university. He transitioned to full-time faculty in 2013, and began advising the Huntsman Marketing Association, a student club which holds case competitions each semester, and performs community service.

In 2017, a team of students he coached won first place in the national Wake Forest Marketing Analytics Case Competition. In 2017, Schulz was named Undergraduate Faculty Mentor at the school, and in 2019 was named Teacher of the Year in the Marketing & Strategy Department.

== Books ==
- Schulz, Eric (1999). The Marketing Game: How the World's Best Companies Play to Win. Adams Media. ISBN 978-1-5806-22226.
- Schulz, Eric (2012). The Smart Marketer's Toolbox: The Latest Marketing Innovations and How to Use Them to Grow Your Business. CreateSpace Independent Publishing Platform. ISBN 978-1-4781-15441.
- Schulz, Eric (2019). Marketing in the Digital Age. Amazon Digital Services. ISBN 9781078159999.
