= COVID-19 Advisory Board =

U.S. president-elect Biden's COVID-19 Advisory Board

- Transition logo for the President-elect of the United States Joe Biden

Agency overview
- Formed: November 2020
- Dissolved: January 20, 2021
- Superseding agency: White House COVID-19 Response Team
- Type: Advisory board
- Jurisdiction: United States
- Agency executives: Joe Biden, President of the United States; Kamala Harris, Vice President of the United States; Co-chairs, David A. Kessler Vivek Murthy Marcella Nunez-Smith
- Website: buildbackbetter.gov

The COVID-19 Advisory Board was announced in November 2020 by President-elect of the United States Joe Biden as part of his presidential transition. It was co-chaired by physicians David A. Kessler, Marcella Nunez-Smith, and Vivek Murthy and comprises 13 health experts. The board was then succeeded by the White House COVID-19 Response Team upon Biden's presidency in January 2021.

== Background ==
Before naming any White House staff or cabinet appointments, Biden announced that he would appoint a COVID-19 task force, co-chaired by former Surgeon General Vivek Murthy, former Food and Drug Administration Commissioner David Kessler and Yale University epidemiologist Professor Marcella Nunez-Smith. In November 2020, he announced the names of 13 health experts to serve on the COVID-19 Advisory Board. Biden pledged a more and larger federal government response to the pandemic than Donald Trump, akin to President Franklin D. Roosevelt's New Deal during the Great Depression. This would include increased testing for SARS-CoV-2, a steady supply of personal protective equipment, distributing a vaccine and securing money from Congress for schools and hospitals under the aegis of a national "supply chain commander" who would coordinate the logistics of manufacturing and distributing protective gear and test kits. This would be distributed by a "Pandemic Testing Board", also similar to Roosevelt's War Production Board during World War II. Biden also pledged to invoke the Defense Production Act more aggressively than Trump in order to build up supplies, as well as the mobilization of up to 100,000 Americans for a "public health jobs corps" of contact tracers to help track and prevent outbreaks.

Jeffrey Zients will work with the advisory board as the incoming White House Coronavirus Response Coordinator (czar). Civil servant and political advisor, Natalie Quillian, will serve as Deputy Coronavirus Response Coordinator.

== Succession ==
The board was dissolved on January 20, 2021, after President Biden was sworn in.

== Members ==
There were 16 members of the COVID-19 advisory board, appointed by President of the United States Joe Biden. Three of the members, David A. Kessler, Vivek Murthy and Marcella Nunez-Smith, served as co-chairs.

Member		Role	Education	Appointment
Portrait of David A. Kessler	David A. Kessler	Former Commissioner of Food and Drugs; Co-chair	Amherst College (BA); University of Chicago (JD); Harvard University (MD)	November 9, 2020
Portrait of Marcella Nuñez-Smith	Marcella Nunez-Smith	Yale School of Medicine associate dean for health equity research Co-chair	Swarthmore College (BA); Thomas Jefferson University (MD)	November 9, 2020
Portrait of Vivek Murthy	Vivek Murthy	Former Surgeon General of the United States; Co-chair	Harvard University (BA); Yale University (MD, MBA)	November 9, 2020
Portrait of Luciana Borio	Luciana Borio	Former Acting Chief Scientist of the U.S. Food and Drug Administration	George Washington University (MD)	November 9, 2020
Portrait of Rick Bright	Rick Bright	Former Director of the Biomedical Advanced Research and Development Authority	University of Kansas; Auburn University, Montgomery (BS); Emory University (MS, PhD)	November 9, 2020
Portrait of Zeke Emanuel	Ezekiel Emanuel	Former Chief of the Department of Bioethics at the National Institutes of Health Clinical Center	Amherst College (BA); Exeter College, Oxford (MS); Harvard University (MD, PhD)	November 9, 2020
Portrait of Atul Gawande	Atul Gawande	Brigham and Women's Hospital professor of surgery	Stanford University (BA, BS); Balliol College, Oxford (MA); Harvard University (MD, MPH)	November 9, 2020
Portrait of Céline R. Gounder	Céline Gounder	New York University School of Medicine assistant professor	Princeton University (BA); Johns Hopkins University (MS); University of Washington, Seattle (MD)	November 9, 2020
Portrait of Julie Morita	Julie Morita	Executive Vice President of the Robert Wood Johnson Foundation	University of Illinois at Urbana–Champaign (BS); University of Illinois College of Medicine (MD)	November 9, 2020
Portrait of Michael Osterholm	Michael Osterholm	Director of the Center for Infectious Disease Research and Policy	Luther College (BA); University of Minnesota (MS, MPH, PhD)	November 9, 2020
Portrait of Loyce Pace	Loyce Pace	Executive Director and President of the Global Health Council	Stanford University (BS); Johns Hopkins University (MPH)	November 9, 2020
	Robert Rodriguez	UCSF School of Medicine emergency medicine professor	University of Notre Dame (BA); Harvard University (MD)	November 9, 2020
Portrait of Eric Goosby	Eric Goosby	Former United States Global AIDS Coordinator	Princeton University (BA); University of California, San Francisco (MD)	November 9, 2020
	Jane Hopkins	Nurse at Harborview Medical Center and Snoqualmie Hospital		November 28, 2020
	Jill Jim	Executive director of the Navajo Department of Health	Northern Arizona University (BA) University of Utah (MPH, PhD)	November 28, 2020
Portrait of David Michaels	David Michaels	Professor of Environmental and Occupational Health at the Milken Institute School of Public Health	Columbia University (MPH, PhD)	November 28, 2020

== See also ==
- Presidency of Joe Biden
- White House Coronavirus Task Force
