= Grant Wahl =

American sportswriter (1973–2022)

- Born: December 2, 1973; Mission, Kansas, U.S.
- Died: December 10, 2022 (aged 49); Lusail, Qatar
- Education: Princeton University
- Occupation: Sports journalist
- Spouse: Céline Gounder (m. 2001)
- Writing career
- Years active: 1996–2022
- Notable work: The Beckham Experiment
- Website: grantwahl.substack.com

Grant Wahl (December 2, 1973 – December 10, 2022) was an American sports journalist and soccer analyst for CBS Sports, a senior writer for Sports Illustrated and a correspondent for Fox Sports, based in New York City. He was also the author of the book The Beckham Experiment (2009).

His Sports Illustrated career mainly focused on college basketball and soccer in the United States. Wahl ran for the FIFA presidency in 2011, but withdrew his campaign after failing to receive an endorsement from a football association. He left Sports Illustrated in 2020 and founded his own podcast and newsletter.

Wahl died from an aortic aneurysm on December 10, 2022, while in Lusail, Qatar as he was covering the 2022 FIFA World Cup.

== Early life and education ==
Wahl was born on December 2, 1973, in Mission, Kansas; he had one older brother, Eric. He was a fan of the Kansas City Comets, a local indoor soccer team. Wahl graduated from Shawnee Mission East High School and was an Eagle Scout. He went on to study at Princeton University, where he earned a Bachelor of Arts in Politics in 1996.

== Career ==
During his first year at Princeton University, Wahl was a reporter for the Daily Princetonian and covered the Princeton Tigers men's soccer team, then coached by Bob Bradley, who would go on to manage Major League Soccer teams and the United States national team. Bradley provided Wahl with an opportunity to study abroad in Argentina, spending time with Boca Juniors, before returning to the United States for the 1994 FIFA World Cup. Wahl cited his experiences with Bradley as having been a catalyst for his love of the sport. His senior thesis at Princeton University investigated the relationship between Argentinean clubs, democratic practices, and civil society.

In 1996, Wahl began his career working with the Miami Herald as an intern and later declined an offer to become a staff writer there. From there, he joined Sports Illustrated in November 1996 as a fact-checker and later began covering college basketball as well as soccer. During his career, Wahl reported on 12 NCAA basketball tournaments, eight FIFA men's World Cups, four FIFA Women's World Cups, and five Olympic Games. He was one of three Sports Illustrated journalists to cover the 1998 FIFA World Cup, but was the lone writer to remain until the final match. Wahl first gained critical acclaim for his cover story "Where's Daddy?" (1998), which documented the growing number of illegitimate children born to professional athletes. Since then, he penned numerous cover stories and profiles on athletes. In addition, Wahl received four Magazine Story of the Year awards given by the U.S. Basketball Writers Association.

Wahl was promoted to the position of senior writer at Sports Illustrated in October 2000, where he mostly covered soccer for both the magazine and SI.com. He wrote over 50 cover stories for the magazine. In 2002, he wrote a cover story on LeBron James, one of the earliest national pieces on the high school basketball player who would go on to be recognized as one of the greatest basketball players of all time. Wahl took a year-long break from the magazine to accompany his wife Celine Gounder during a research trip to South Africa in 2008. During this time, he wrote his first book, The Beckham Experiment (2009), which focused on the 2007 move of David Beckham to the LA Galaxy in Major League Soccer and his impact on the league. It became a New York Times Best Seller.

In October 2009, while covering the fourth round of 2010 FIFA World Cup qualification, Wahl was robbed of his phone and wallet at gunpoint in broad daylight in Tegucigalpa, Honduras; earlier in the day, he had interviewed interim Honduran president Roberto Micheletti, who later apologized to Wahl over the incident.

In February 2011, Wahl announced a possible bid to become President of FIFA in the upcoming election to unseat incumbent Sepp Blatter. He pulled out before the official deadline, however, after failing to earn an endorsement from a football association (at least one was required). As a result of Wahl's bid, FIFA amended its presidential nomination process to require the endorsement of at least five associations. Wahl joined FOX Sports in October 2012 after having participated in the network's coverage of the UEFA Euro 2012 tournament earlier that year.

In 2013, Sports Illustrated launched their soccer section, named "Planet Fútbol", with Wahl at the helm. He published his second book, Masters of Modern Soccer, in 2018; it featured interviews with top players and evaluations of their playing styles. On April 10, 2020, he was fired from Sports Illustrated after criticizing James Heckman, CEO of the magazine's publisher Maven, for his handling of pay cuts during the coronavirus pandemic. In response, Heckman criticized both Wahl's work and not wanting to volunteer for a permanent pay cut. He went on to join CBS Sports on October 5, 2021, where he became an analyst for its coverage of CONCACAF soccer matches, as well as an editorial consultant for soccer documentaries to air on Paramount+.

Wahl established his own independent newsletter, named Fútbol with Grant Wahl for his existing podcast, in August 2021. He also released a podcast series on the career of Freddy Adu in 2020 that was distributed by Blue Wire Media. Wahl was a producer on the 2022 documentary series Good Rivals, where he was also interviewed about the Mexico–United States soccer rivalry.

While following the United States to the 2022 FIFA World Cup, Wahl became caught up in a crackdown in Qatar on items that featured a rainbow in support of the LGBT community. Wahl was detained for about 25 minutes outside a stadium over the rainbow patterned T-shirt he was wearing, while a reporter for The New York Times, who was with him, was also detained briefly by Qatari officials. His last entry, published on December 8 and titled "They just don't care", criticized leaders of Qatar for their apathy towards the death of migrant laborers at construction sites in the country and the absence of LGBT rights in the country.

== Personal life ==
In 2001, Wahl married his Princeton schoolmate Céline Gounder, a journalist and New York University medical doctor who specializes in infectious diseases and global health.

== Death ==
Wahl collapsed suddenly in his press box seat at the Lusail Iconic Stadium in Qatar while covering the quarterfinal match between Argentina and the Netherlands. Local paramedics responded quickly and treated him for 30 minutes, including providing CPR, before Wahl was transported to Hamad General Hospital, according to a statement by his wife. Wahl was pronounced dead on December 10, 2022.

Eric Wahl said his brother had received death threats and that he believed Wahl was killed. He also stated that the family was in contact with U.S. State Department and White House officials. The U.S. Embassy arranged for his body to be repatriated under escort from a consular official. Eric Wahl later called for transparency, but retracted his claims of foul play; the U.S. State Department also stated that they saw "no indication of foul play or anything nefarious at this point". Wahl's body was repatriated to the United States on December 12 to undergo an autopsy with the New York City Medical Examiner, which determined that the death was caused by an aortic aneurysm. Wahl had complained of chest discomfort and sought help at the medical clinic at the World Cup media center, where he was told that he probably had bronchitis. He was given cough syrup and antibiotics at the clinic.

FIFA president Gianni Infantino, the U.S. Soccer Federation, Major League Soccer, fellow journalists, and other figures in American soccer and around the world issued statements in honor of Wahl's career. U.S. Secretary of State Antony Blinken shared his condolences on Twitter following the repatriation of Wahl's remains. A photo and flowers were placed at his assigned seat at Al Bayt Stadium during a quarterfinal match between England and France. A video tribute was also played at the stadium and during television broadcasts in the United States by Fox Sports.

== Awards and recognition ==
On January 25, 2023, the National Soccer Hall of Fame announced that Wahl would be posthumously awarded their Colin Jose Media Award, which honors media members who have made significant contributions to soccer in the United States. Wahl was formally honored at the Hall's May 6, 2023 induction ceremony, with Wahl's wife, Céline Gounder, and his brother, Eric Wahl, accepting the media award on his behalf.

Also on January 25, the United States Soccer Federation announced that for that evening's friendly match between the U.S. Men's National Team and Serbia at Los Angeles' BMO Stadium, a press box seat would be left open in Wahl's memory, decorated with his framed photo, flowers, and a USMNT jersey bearing his last name. The federation would honor Wahl in this manner at every home match involving the U.S. men's or women's teams through the 2026 FIFA World Cup, an event the U.S. is co-hosting with Canada and Mexico. Major League Soccer also reserved an empty press box seat for Wahl at each match of the league's 2023 season opening weekend.

The press box at CPKC Stadium, the soccer-specific home for National Women's Soccer League team Kansas City Current, was dedicated to Wahl in November 2023.

The fourth episode of Season 3 of the Apple TV+ series Ted Lasso was dedicated to the memory of Wahl, who was a fan of the show and fielded questions from its writers concerning a storyline in which journalist Trent Crimm (James Lance) writes a book about Zava's (Maximilian Osinski) arrival at AFC Richmond, the team depicted in the series. Another nod to Wahl in the same episode finds Coach Beard (Brendan Hunt) carrying Wahl's book The Beckham Experiment in one scene.

== Books ==
- Wahl, Grant (2009). The Beckham Experiment. Crown. ISBN 0-307-40787-X.
- Wahl, Grant (2018). Masters of Modern Soccer: How the World's Best Play the Twenty-First-Century Game. Crown. ISBN 9780307408600.
- Wahl, Grant (2024). World Class: Purpose, Passion, and the Pursuit of Greatness On and Off the Field. Ballantine. ISBN 9780593726761

== See also ==
- New Yorkers in journalism
