= The Beckham Experiment =

2009 book about soccer by Grant Wahl

The Beckham Experiment: How the World's Most Famous Athlete Tried to Conquer America
- Author: Grant Wahl
- Language: English
- Subject: Sports
- Genre: Nonfiction
- Publisher: Crown
- Publication date: July 14, 2009
- Publication place: United States
- Pages: 304
- ISBN: 978-0307408594

The Beckham Experiment: How the World's Most Famous Athlete Tried to Conquer America is a non-fiction work by Sports Illustrated writer Grant Wahl. The book chronicles David Beckham's move to Major League Soccer and his impact on American soccer.

== Background ==
Wahl, a veteran soccer writer for Sports Illustrated, was asked to cover David Beckham's move from Real Madrid to Los Angeles Galaxy in 2007. He was granted one-on-one access to Beckham and his handlers. The original concept for the book was to follow Beckham and Galaxy, but due to his injuries the book was halted. Initially, Wahl approached Beckham's management about a potential book deal. However, Beckham's management gave Wahl the indication he would have to pay to write a book about the English midfielder. Wahl refused to pay for interviews and used his resources at Galaxy to obtain interview time with Beckham. Over a two-year period, Wahl interviewed Beckham after games as well as Ruud Gullit (Galaxy head coach from November 2007 until August 2008), Landon Donovan (Galaxy player), and Alexi Lalas (Galaxy general manager at the time).

== Summary ==
In January 2007, 31-year-old Beckham, one of the world's most famous soccer players, at the time playing with Real Madrid, shocked the sports world by signing a five-year contract with MLS team LA Galaxy, effective from the end of the 2006–07 La Liga season, which was in progress when the announcement was made. In addition to playing soccer, under the advisement of talent manager Simon Fuller and his company 19 Entertainment, Beckham set out to conquer the U.S. celebrity scene. At this time, Wahl was given unprecedented access to the English player, his inner circle, and team to promote his arrival to the league. To 19 Management's dismay, he would not relinquish control of his articles or methods of procuring information. As a result, he was able to give a behind-the-scenes account of Beckham's impact on LA Galaxy.

Initially, Beckham had a great financial impact on LA Galaxy drawing sold out crowds, additional owners, additional sponsors, and an increase in sold merchandise. Behind the scenes, Beckham's management was seeking control over the team and league. Beckham's designated player status as well as his overall stature and celebrity enabled him to seek preferential treatment including the captaincy, his own parking spot right next to the dressing room, and his own hotel room on road trips.

This preferential treatment along with Beckham's salary (much higher than that of his teammates) greatly affected the team. Ripping the captaincy out of Donovan's hands had heavy consequences. Both years when Beckham was captain, the team failed to make it to the MLS playoffs. The book also delves into larger issues such as the MLS's failing structure.

== Reception ==
The book was released on July 14, 2009 in accordance with Beckham's return to LA Galaxy from his first loan spell at A.C. Milan. The book debuted at number 9 on the New York Times Best Sellers List.

== Reaction ==
The book was released just as Beckham returned to LA Galaxy from a loan spell with AC Milan in Serie A. The loan deal agreed in December 2008 had originally been scheduled to end in March 2009, so that Beckham could return to Los Angeles in time for the start of the 2009 MLS season, however, it was extended until the end of the 2008–09 Serie A season. At this point, LA Galaxy along with the players were fed up with Beckham. The tension between Beckham and Donovan was high. Donovan had participated in the book and was very critical of Beckham, stating he was a bad teammate who took over the team but did not care about American soccer, MLS, or his teammates. Beckham retaliated by calling Donovan's statements unprofessional. The pair have since made up.

Upon Beckham's return, LA Galaxy fans as well as MLS fans booed Beckham. Fans taunted Beckham with signs and chants.
