= Luciana Borio =

Brazilian-American physician and public health administrator

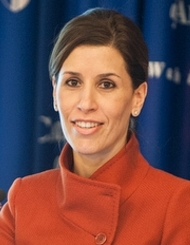
- Born: Rio de Janeiro, Brazil

Academic background
- Education: George Washington University (MD)

Academic work
- Discipline: Medicine; Public health
- Sub-discipline: Infectious diseases Biodefense; Health security

Luciana Borio is a Brazilian-American infectious disease physician, public health expert, and venture capitalist. She is a Senior Fellow for Global Health at the Council on Foreign Relations, and a Venture Partner at Arch Venture Partners. From 2019 to 2021, Borio was a vice president at In-Q-Tel. She previously served as director for Medical and Biodefense Preparedness at the National Security Council, acting chief scientist of the U.S. Food and Drug Administration (FDA), assistant commissioner for counterterrorism policy of the FDA, and director of FDA's Office of Counterterrorism and Emerging Threats. She is known for her work advancing clinical trials, the development of medical countermeasures for health emergencies, and the responses to domestic and international public health emergencies.

== Early life and education ==
Borio obtained her MD in 1996 from George Washington University. She completed her residency in 1999 in internal medicine at the Weill Cornell Medical Center and subsequently completed a combined fellowship in infectious diseases at Johns Hopkins University and critical care medicine at the National Institutes of Health. Borio serves as an adjunct assistant professor of medicine at Johns Hopkins Hospital.

== Career ==
Borio is an infectious disease physician. Prior to joining FDA's Center for Biologics Evaluation and Research in 2008, Borio was senior associate at the UPMC Center for Health Security and assistant professor of medicine at the University of Pittsburgh (2003–2008). Borio served at the United States Department of Health and Human Services as an advisor on biodefense programs (2001 to 2008), where she implemented and managed mathematical modeling projects to assess the health effects of bioterrorism on civilians and to inform medical countermeasures procurement activities for the Office of Preparedness and Response. Before leaving her role as assistant commissioner of FDA, she approved a partnership in infectious disease research with the Bill & Melinda Gates Foundation.

In 2020, Borio was appointed by the Council on Foreign Relations to serve on its Independent Task Force on Improving Pandemic Preparedness, co-chaired by Sylvia Mathews Burwell and Frances Townsend.

In 2020, she was an honoree of the Great Immigrants Award named by Carnegie Corporation of New York.

From November 9, 2020, to January 20, 2021, Borio served as one of the 13 members of the COVID-19 Advisory Board.

In 2021, she was elected to the National Academy of Medicine.

== Other activities ==
- Codagenix, Member of the Scientific Advisory Board
- Goldman Sachs, Consultant
