= Robert Rodriguez (physician) =

American emergency physician

- Born: Brownsville, Texas, U.S.
- Education: University of Notre Dame (BS); Harvard University (MD)
- Medical career
- Field: Emergency medicine Internal medicine Critical care medicine
- Institutions: San Francisco General Hospital; UCSF School of Medicine

Robert M. Rodriguez is an American emergency physician working at the San Francisco General Hospital. He is a professor of emergency medicine at the UCSF School of Medicine and was a member of the COVID-19 Advisory Board of U.S. president Joe Biden.

== Early life and education ==
Rodriguez was born in Brownsville, Texas to a Latino family. He earned his undergraduate degree at University of Notre Dame and a medical degree at Harvard Medical School. Rodriguez completed a 5-year residency in emergency medicine and internal medicine at Ronald Reagan UCLA Medical Center. He developed an interest in the physiology of critically ill patients and completed a 2-year critical care fellowship at Stanford University Medical Center. Rodriguez is board certified in emergency medicine, internal medicine, and critical care medicine.

== Career ==
Rodriguez is an emergency physician at San Francisco General Hospital and a professor of emergency medicine at the UCSF School of Medicine. In July 2020, Rodriguez treated patients along the Mexico–United States border during the COVID-19 pandemic in Texas. He researched heightened stress and anxiety levels among physicians during the COVID-19 pandemic. In November 2020, he was named to the COVID-19 Advisory Board of President Joe Biden.
