= Loyce Pace =

American public healthy policy expert

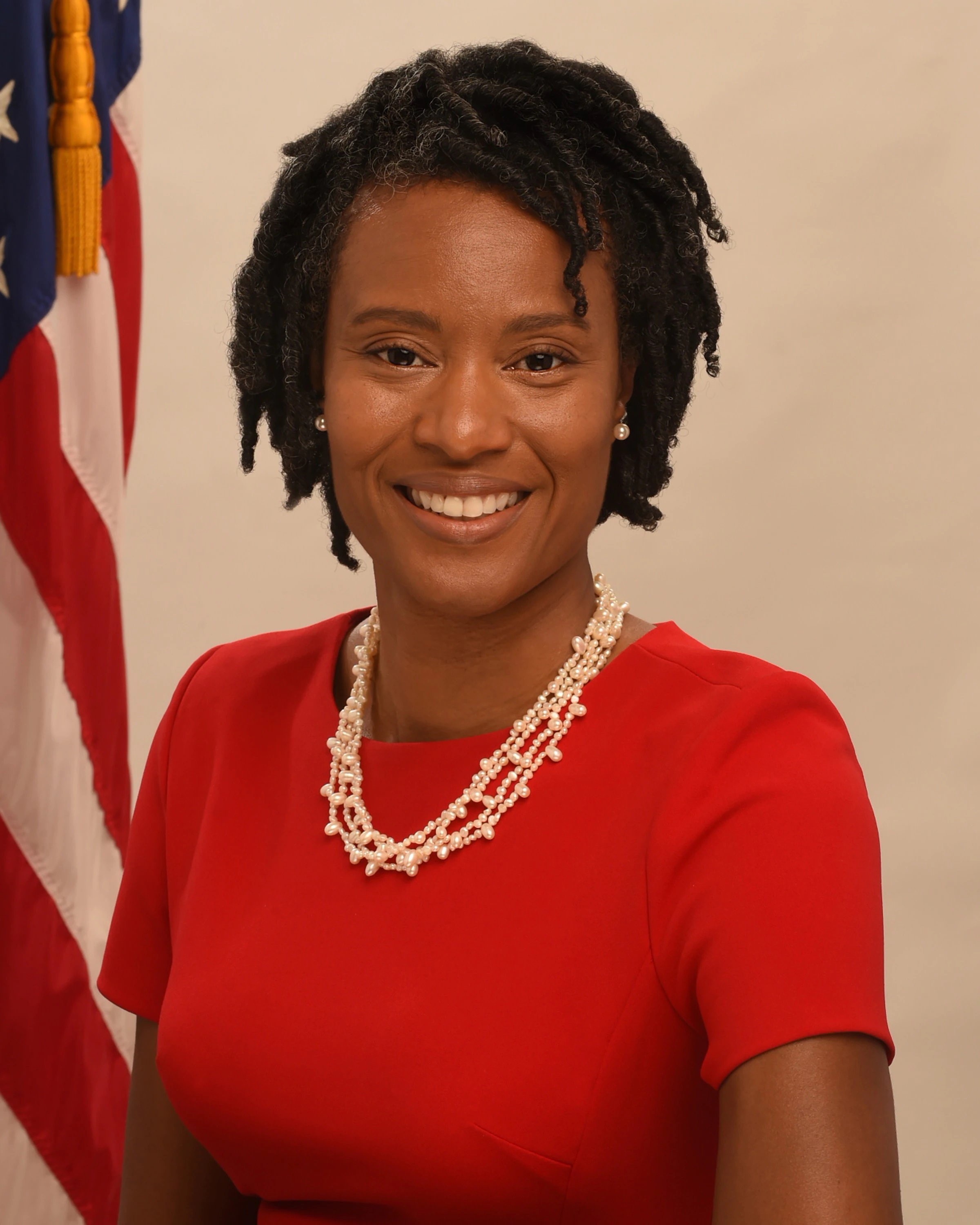

Assistant Secretary for Global Affairs at the United States Department of Health and Human Services
- In office March 1, 2021 – January 20, 2025
- President: Joe Biden
- Preceded by: Garrett Grigsby
- Succeeded by: Vacant

President and Executive Director of the Global Health Council
- In office 2016–2020

Member of the COVID-19 Advisory Board
- In office November 9, 2020–January 20, 2021

Personal details
- Education: Stanford University (BS); Johns Hopkins University (MPH)

Loyce Pace is an American public health expert serving as the Assistant Secretary in the Office of Global Affairs for the U.S. Department of Health & Human Services. She was executive director of the Global Health Council and member of President-elect Joe Biden's COVID-19 Advisory Board. Pace specializes in public health policy and global health equity, working to promote access to health care around the world.

== Education ==
After graduating from Phillips Academy in 1995, Pace attended Stanford University for her undergraduate work, where she studied human biology and received her Bachelor of Science degree in 1999. While she had initially planned on pursuing a career in medicine, she developed an interest in public health during her tenure at Stanford. After graduating, she briefly worked as a teacher in her hometown of Los Angeles before becoming involved in community health advocacy. She followed this interest to Washington, D.C., pursuing her Master of Public Health degree at Johns Hopkins Bloomberg School of Public Health, which she received in 2005, concentrating on international health and human rights.

== Career ==
From 2006 to 2011, Pace worked as Director of Regional Programs for the American Cancer Society. She then became the Executive Advisor for Programs and Policy at the Livestrong Foundation before becoming President and Executive Director of Global Health Council, a non-profit organization that represents public health professionals across 150 countries, in 2016. In this role, she has advocated strongly for increased investments in global health to ensure health security in the face of budget cuts under the Trump administration to agencies like the United States Agency for International Development. In 2019, she testified before the United States House of Representatives, calling for greater support for global health assistance.

Pace is director of the Office of Global Affairs in the United States Department of Health and Human Services (HHS). Pace is responsible for advancing the U.S. international health agenda through multilateral and bilateral forums. Reporting directly to the U.S. Secretary of Health and Human Services, she is the Office of Global Affairs’ lead on setting priorities and policies that promote American public health agencies and interests worldwide. Pace oversees HHS’ engagement with foreign governments and international institutions as well policymaking bodies such as the G7, G20, United Nations General Assembly (UNGA), and World Health Assembly.

=== COVID-19 Response ===
Pace has advocated against the United States withdrawal from the World Health Organization amidst the global pandemic, expressing concerns that other nations might follow suit during an international crisis. In April 2020 when the United States first considered pulling their funding of the WHO, Pace led an open letter to the Trump administration to reverse course; the letter was signed by over 1,000 charities, medical experts, and healthcare companies. In her capacity leading the Global Health Council, she has also convened leaders in global health to think through how to strengthen the existing global health architecture in response to COVID-19 and future public health threats, particularly in accordance with the United Nations Sustainable Development Goals.

On November 9, 2020, President-elect of the United States Joe Biden announced Pace as a member of the COVID-19 Advisory Board.
