= Global Health Council =

American non-profit organization

- Founded: 1972
- Type: Advocacy
- Purpose: Global Health, Access and Information
- Location: Washington, DC
- Region served: Worldwide
- Method: Networking, Organizational Membership
- Key people: Loyce Pace, President & Executive Director (December 2016- )
- Revenue: $808,340 (2015)
- Website: www.GlobalHealth.org

The Global Health Council is a United States–based non-profit networking organization "supporting and connecting advocates, implementers and stakeholders around global health priorities worldwide". The Council is the world's largest membership alliance dedicated to advancing policies and programs that improve health around the world. The Council serves and represents thousands of public health professionals from over 150 countries. They work "to improve health globally through increased investment, robust policies and the power of the collective voice.": According to their website the Council "convenes stakeholders around key global health priorities and actively engages key decision makers to influence health policy."

After shutting its doors in 2012, GHC re-opened with a newly elected board of directors on January 1, 2013. In their new model, the Global Health Council works in three main areas: policy and advocacy, member engagement, and connections and coordination. Reflecting this focus, GHC offers an online platform that includes guest blogs, member spotlights, policy briefs, advocacy updates, and global health job postings. Additionally, the GHC has since participated in significant global health events at the national and international level including the World Health Assembly, Global Health Week on the Hill, and the Consortium of Universities for Global Health Consortium.

The Council coordinates and participates in a number of working groups, coalitions, and roundtables in the global health advocacy community, including the GHC Budget Roundtable and Global Health Security Roundtable. The Council maintains a global health Advocacy Hub and coordinates the biennial publication of the Global Health Briefing Book. The most recent publication, titled Global Health Works: Maximizing U.S. Investments for Healthier and Stronger Communities, was released in 2017 for the 115th U.S. Congress.

== History ==
Through almost five decades of work, the Global Health Council has continuously served as the leading membership organization focused on global health advocacy.

In 1972, the ‘National Council for International Health’ was first established. In 1998, the organization became the Global Health Council to better represent its work in the 21st century. As the council evolved, its name had to evolve to correctly reflect the scope of the Council's work. The inclusion of global in its name reflected the Council's goal to include more international organizations and individuals in its membership and become the preeminent non-governmental source of information, practical experience, analysis and public advocacy for the most pressing global health issues.

In 1998, the Council began organizing the Global Health Action Network in pursuit of its advocacy building goals. The network was designed to establish groups of motivated citizens across the U.S. to educate local communities and their elected officials about the need for a more proactive approach to global health. With this network in place, the Council was able to implement nationwide advocacy campaigns dealing with vital global health issues. The Council continued to grow as the voice for global health by using its annual conference; its website to promote advocacy, education and information sharing; its media outreach through a diverse field of multi-disciplinary specialists; and its publications, including the Global Health Magazine ".

As part of the Council's work in advocacy and developing awareness of the AIDS crisis, the seventeen-year-old International AIDS Candlelight Memorial event came under their stewardship in 1999. The International AIDS Candlelight Memorial grew to include 1,500 communities in more than 100 countries. It is the world's largest and oldest grassroots HIV/AIDS event.

In April 2012, the Global Health Council announced it would be closing its doors for the upcoming months. The Board of Directors released the announcement acknowledging that, “although the Global Health Council will no longer play the same role, we will continue to fight for the goals that first inspired us to action.”

With no unified voice for global health in the advocacy sphere, 40 international organizations came together at the end of 2012 to pledge almost $300,000 over three years to establish a new Global Health Council. The new Council included a newly elected Board of Directors and leaner business model. In January 2013, the Global Health Council reopened its doors to continue their mission bringing global health concerns to the forefront of policy work. The Council added Global Impact to serve as the organization Secretariat, in order to allow the Council to focus on advocacy through convening, communications, and coalition-building. Dr. Christine Sow was selected as its new executive director, becoming the first woman to lead the organization.

GHC has hundreds of individual and organizational members representing a number of sectors in the global health field. In 2014, GHC member organizations operated in more than 150 countries worldwide and had a combined annual revenue of over $40 billion. The board of directors is led by Dr. Jonathan Quick of Management Sciences for Health (MSH). Loyce Pace became president and executive director of the organization in December 2016.

== Focus ==
- Women's health
- Child health
- HIV/AIDS
- Infectious diseases
- Emerging health threats

== Awards ==
The Council has administered a number of prominent awards. Some of the recipients have been barred from traveling to receive them which has brought attention to their work. In addition to the following honorific awards the organization has also conferred the "Best Practices in Global Health Award" and the "Excellence in Media Award for Global Health".

=== Jonathan Mann Award for Health and Human Rights ===
The Jonathan Mann Award for Health and Human Rights is named for former head of the World Health Organization (WHO)'s global AIDS program, Jonathan Mann, who resigned to protest the lack of response from the United Nations and WHO with regard to AIDS. In 2001, the recipient was Gao Yaojie, a retired Chinese gynecologist and one of China's foremost AIDS fighters who helped poor farmers in Henan Province that were infected with H.I.V. through selling their blood at for-profit and unsanitary collection stations. Yaojie was denied permission to attend an awards ceremony in Washington with Secretary General Kofi Annan of the United Nations as her host.

In 2008, the Mann award was to be given to Binayak Sen, a prominent Indian doctor responsible for drawing up one of the most successful community-based health-care models in India—based on the traditional mitanin, a health worker who advises the rural poor on preventive care—making health care available to many who had lacked access. He had been a vocal critic of the government's use of armed groups to push villagers out of mineral-rich forests to boost development and was jailed in April 2007 on sedition charges, including allegedly being linked to Maoist rebels and smuggling a letter for an accused Maoist prisoner he had visited. Sen denies the charges and his effort to get the award in person was bolstered by 22 Nobel laureates; he is out of jail on bail.

=== Gates Award ===
Named for and funded by Bill & Melinda Gates Foundation, the Microsoft Corp. founder and his wife, the Gates Award ($1 million) is administered by the Council. In 2004 the award went to Fazle Hasan Abed and his organization, Bangladesh Rural Advancement Committee (BRAC), one of the "world's most successful development organizations, credited with improving the health and welfare of tens of millions of destitute people in Bangladesh". Past winners include the Rotary Foundation, which has raised millions for an ongoing global campaign to stamp out polio.

The winner of the 2009 Gates Award was awarded to The London School of Hygiene & Tropical Medicine.

== Funding ==
From its inception through the 1990s, the Council was principally funded by grants (primarily from the U.S. Agency for International Development [USAID] and the Centers for Disease Control [CDC])." In 1998, Nils Daulaire, formerly of USAID, became president of The Global Health Council and felt that the council should be an independent voice. The council diversified its funding as a matter of principle, even though at the time its policy agenda was consistent with that of the then administration. By 2003, only 20 percent of the council’s funding came from the U.S. government."

The Council has received grants of varying sizes from a variety of foundations, including the Gates, Packard, Hewlett MacArthur, and Rockefeller.

As part of the President's Emergency Plan for AIDS Relief, US government support for AIDS prevention was contingent on opposing prostitution starting in 2003. The Council preferred to remain neutral so as not to alienate sex workers from their anti-HIV efforts so they sued in federal court with other non-profits. In 2013, the U.S. Supreme Court found that the requirement violated the First Amendment's prohibition against compelled speech in Agency for International Development v. Alliance for Open Society International, Inc.
