= Brad McRae =

American wildlife ecologist

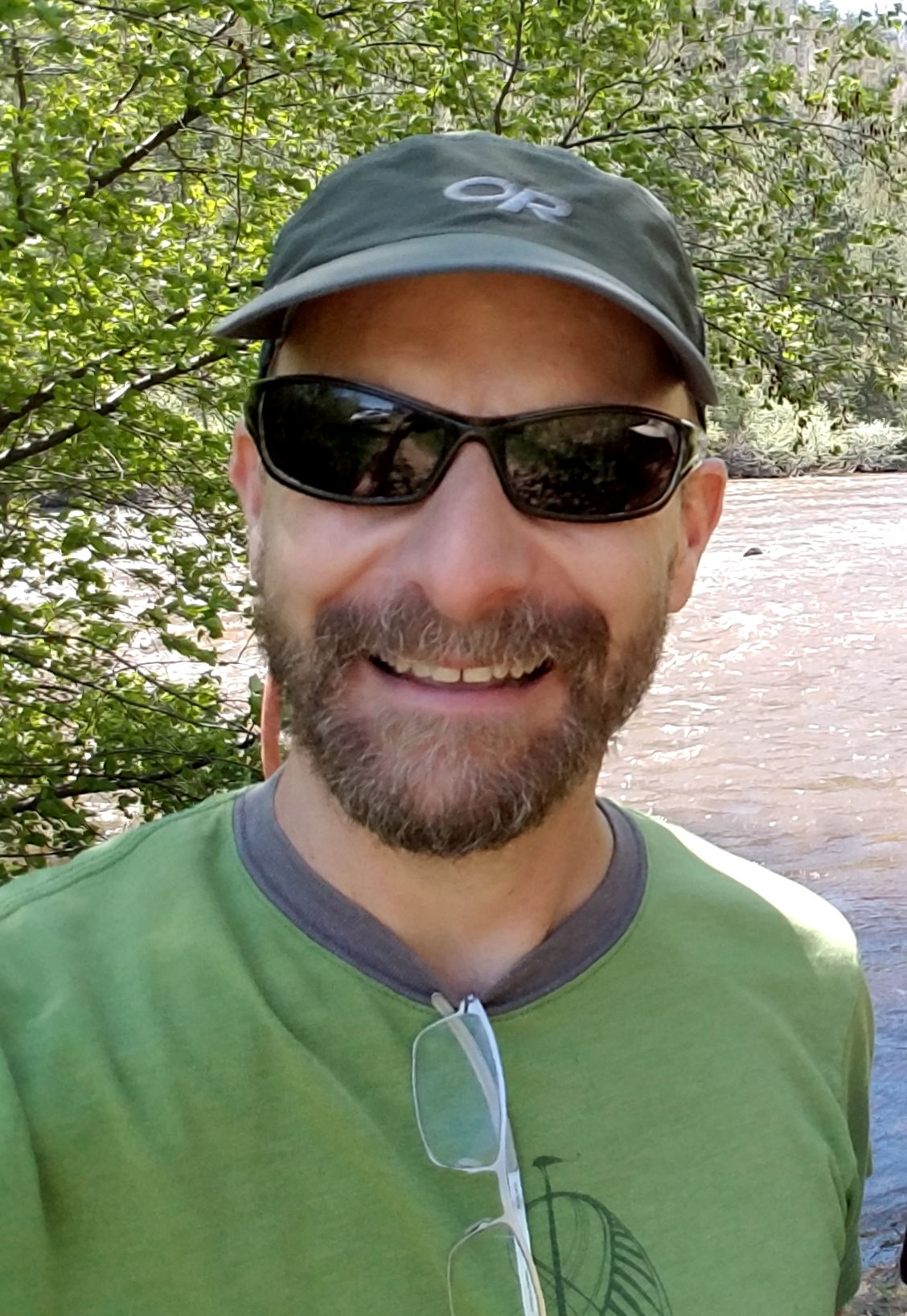
- Born: 1966
- Died: 2017 (aged 50–51)
- Education: Northern Arizona University
- Known for: Circuitscape, Population genetics, Conservation biology, Landscape ecology
- Awards: The Spatial Ecology and Telemetry Working Group (SETWG) of The Wildlife Society award for creating Circuitscape
- Scientific career
- Workplaces: The Nature Conservancy
- Academic advisors: Paul Beier

Brad McRae (1966 – 2017) was an American wildlife ecologist.

== Education and early career ==
McRae studied electrical engineering at Clarkson University, and received a bachelor's degree in 1989. After working as an engineer in New York for four years, he moved to the University of Wisconsin–Madison to study wildlife ecology under Stanley Temple, and received a Master of Science degree in 1995.

He then worked for the Okanagen-Wenatchee National Forest for three years, before beginning a PhD at Northern Arizona University. For his dissertation, under Paul Beier, he studied the landscape genetics of the puma or mountain lion (Puma concolor) in the neighboring regions of the United States.

== Puma landscape genetics study ==
In studying the landscape genetics of the Puma, McRae chose to model gene flow across a fragmented landscape as following the same rules for electrical conductance in a complex circuit with many resistors of varying values. This model allowed gene flow to occur across multiple paths in the landscape in proportion to their "resistance", calculated in an electrical circuit using Kirchhoff's laws. This model was different from the paradigm at the time, which assumed that gene flow would occur along the single "least cost" path. McRae's model, published chiefly in three papers between 2006 and 2008, became influential within wildlife population genetics and conservation biology. At the time of McRae's death in 2017, the three papers had been cited more than 1700 times, and a software package written by McRae implementing his model had been used in more than 200 academic papers. In an obituary, his model was described as having become the dominant paradigm for landscape genetics by 2009.

== Postdoctoral career ==
After completing his doctorate, McRae worked as a postdoctoral researcher for the US Environmental Protection Agency, and subsequently took another postdoctoral position at the National Center for Ecological Analysis and Synthesis in Santa Barbara. In 2008, he began working at The Nature Conservancy, where he worked on land management and increasing habitat connectivity for wildlife.

== Death ==
McRae died in July 2017 of stomach cancer, five months after being diagnosed with the disease. He had a wife and two children.
