= Lomayumtewa C. Ishii =

Hopi associate professor and researcher

- Born: Lomayumtewa Curtis Ishii; 1959/60
- Other name: "Loma"
- Citizenship: United States
- Occupations: Professor; academic
- Known for: Books on Native American history and sociology
- Title: Doctor
- Board member of: former Chair of the Applied Indigenous Studies Department at Northern Arizona University

Academic background
- Education: Northern Arizona University
- Thesis: "Voices from our ancestors: Hopi resistance to scientific historicide" (2001)

Academic work
- Discipline: Applied Indigenous Studies
- Sub-discipline: Native American Anthropology and Sociology; Contemporary Native American issues in the United States
- Institutions: University of Iowa; University of Tübingen, Germany; Institutum Studiorum Humanitatis; Smithsonian Institution; Diné College; Temple University Japan; Northern Arizona University
- Influenced: Irena Šumi

Lomayumtewa Curtis "Loma" Ishii is a Hopi associate professor and researcher, working in the Applied Indigenous Studies department at Northern Arizona University.

== Early life ==
He is from a small Hopi settlement in the mesas of Northern Arizona, in Navajo County, called Sichomovi. He attended high school in Irving, Texas, at Irving High School, graduating in 1978. While at college, Ishii pledged Phi Alpha Theta in 1994.

== Career ==
During his PhD studies, Ishii was awarded the Ford Foundation Dissertation Fellowship. After obtaining his PhD from Northern Arizona University in 2001, Ishii began working and researching at several institutions, including the Smithsonian, before returning to his alma mater. He then took a postdoctoral fellowship position in Native Studies at the University of Iowa in 2002; at the fellowship culmination he returned to Northern Arizona University as a Visiting Assistant Professor in 2003/4. He began a tenure track in 2004, and in 2006 presented work at the Hawaii International Conference on Arts and Humanities in Honolulu for the university; he earned tenure there in 2010. However, he is still a popular speaker and researcher with a variety of institutions. In 2017 he was the keynote speaker at the 39th American Indian Workshop held in Ghent, in Belgium, after having presented at the 30th AIW in 2009.

== Native issues in modern society ==
One element of Ishii's research is study of the continuing social effects of colonization and modernization of Native Americans, something he also speaks about on public platforms. Interviewed for the Tucson Sentinel in 2010, Ishii explained that there are still "cultural and linguistic barriers" for Native people trying to communicate the importance of their religious places to others, suggesting that the meaning of natural sites is hard to explain in Western legal terms. He also spoke to the Albuquerque Journal about polemic elections in the Hopi tribe, explaining that they need leaders who can handle maintaining their tribal identity as well as easing the people into modernization.
