= Ted Larsen (sculptor) =

American artist

- Born: 1964 (age 60–61); South Haven, Michigan
- Education: Northern Arizonan University and Whittier College
- Known for: Contemporary visual art

Ted Larsen (born 1964) is an American contemporary visual artist living and working in Santa Fe, New Mexico. He makes small scale work from repurposed salvaged materials.

== Early life and education ==
As a young child, Larsen was attracted to discarded tools, tractor parts, and other equipment that lay in a pile on his family property in South Haven, Michigan. He also played in abandoned airplanes in a nearby airport. At the age of 15 Larsen moved from Michigan to Santa Fe with his family. After graduating from Santa Fe Preparatory School, he earned a Bachelor of Arts degree from Northern Arizona University in Flagstaff.

== Career ==
Ted Larsen found early success as a landscape painter that included iconic barn images. By the time he was 22, he exhibited at the Philadelphia Museum of Art. He was dissatisfied with painting and abandoned his practice after the World Trade Center attacks in 2001. He began cutting and arranging scraps of metal, built around a substructure of birch laminate material. With a painter's eye, Larsen searches for material to work with at salvage yards, then further processes materials in his studio. Larsen states, "I am indeed looking for a palette— different types of greens, blues, yellows. They have to have a certain quality, not too raw, not too clean."

Larsen's work has been exhibited widely in private foundations and museums in the US, including the New Mexico Museum of Art in Santa Fe, The Albuquerque Museum, The Amarillo Museum of Art, and The Spiva Center for the Arts in Joplin, Missouri.

He was a guest lecturer at the South Carolina Governor's School for the Arts; the Santa Fe University of Art and Design; the Palm Springs Art Museum; the New Mexico Museum of Art; SITE Santa Fe; the Texas Society of Architects; the Boulder Museum of Contemporary Art, Boulder, Colorado; the Denver Museum of Art.

His work was favorably reviewed by Elisabeth Sussman.

== Achievements ==
Larsen's received a Pollock-Krasner Foundation award, as well as grant recipient of the Surdna Foundation; residencies with the Edward F. Albee Foundation and Asilah Arts Festival in Morocco, where he represented the United States.

== Collections ==
- New Mexico Museum of Art
- Lannan Foundation.
