= Jill Jim =

American health administrator and epidemiologist

Member of the COVID-19 Advisory Board
- In office November 9, 2020–January 20, 2021

Director of the Navajo Department of Health
- In office 2019–2020

Personal details
- Education: Northern Arizona University (BA); University of Utah (PhD)

Jill Jim is an American (Navajo) health administrator and epidemiologist serving as executive director of the Navajo Department of Health. She is a member of U.S. President Joe Biden's COVID-19 Advisory Board.

== Education ==
Jim completed a bachelor's degree in health promotion and community health education at Northern Arizona University. She earned a master's degree in health care administration and public health from University of Utah where she later completed a PhD in public health in 2017. Her dissertation was titled Healthcare Cost and Utilization Differences among American Indian and Alaska Native Compared with Non-Hispanic White Patients with Lung Cancer. Jim's doctoral advisor was Mia Hashibe.

== Career ==
Jim was a health care analyst for HealthInsight in Albuquerque, New Mexico. She worked as a consultant for the Navajo Area Indian Health Service and later as an epidemiologist for the Utah Department of Health. In January 2019, she became a member of Jonathan Nez's cabinet as executive director of the Navajo Department of Health. On November 28, 2020, Jim was announced as a member of U.S. President-elect Joe Biden's COVID-19 Advisory Board.

== Personal life ==
Jim is originally from Navajo Mountain, Utah. Jim is fluent in the Navajo language and a member of the Navajo Nation.
