= David A. Kessler =

American pediatrician & attorney (born 1951)

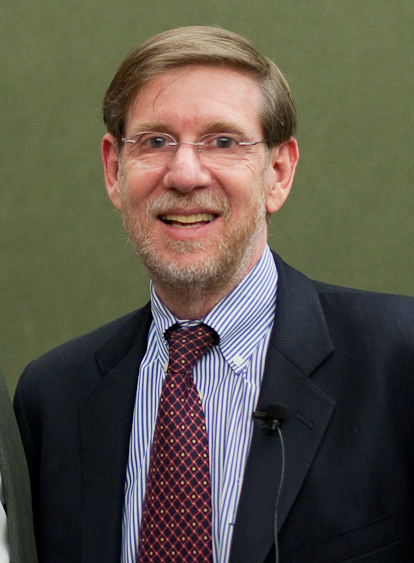
- Kessler in April 2009

Head of Operation Warp Speed
- In office January 20, 2021 – February 24, 2021
- President: Joe Biden
- Preceded by: Moncef Slaoui
- Succeeded by: Gustave F. Perna (Chief Operating Officer of COVID-19 Response for Vaccine and Therapeutics)

Co-Chair of the COVID-19 Advisory Board
- In office November 9, 2020 – January 20, 2021 Serving with Vivek Murthy and Marcella Nunez-Smith
- Preceded by: Office established
- Succeeded by: Office abolished

16th Commissioner of Food and Drugs
- In office November 8, 1990 – February 28, 1997
- President: George H. W. Bush; Bill Clinton
- Preceded by: Frank Young
- Succeeded by: Jane E. Henney

Personal details
- Born: David Aaron Kessler; May 13, 1951 (age 75) Brooklyn, New York City, U.S.
- Education: Amherst College (BA); University of Chicago (JD); Harvard University (MD)

David Aaron Kessler (born May 13, 1951) is an American pediatrician, attorney, author, and administrator (both academic and governmental) who served as Chief Science Officer of the White House COVID-19 Response Team from January 20, 2021, to May 2023.

Kessler was the commissioner of the Food and Drug Administration (FDA) from 8 November 1990 to 28 February 1997. He co-chaired the Biden-Harris transition's COVID-19 Advisory Board from November 2020 to January 2021 and headed Operation Warp Speed, the U.S. government program to accelerate the development of COVID-19 vaccines and other treatments, from January to February 2021.

== Background ==
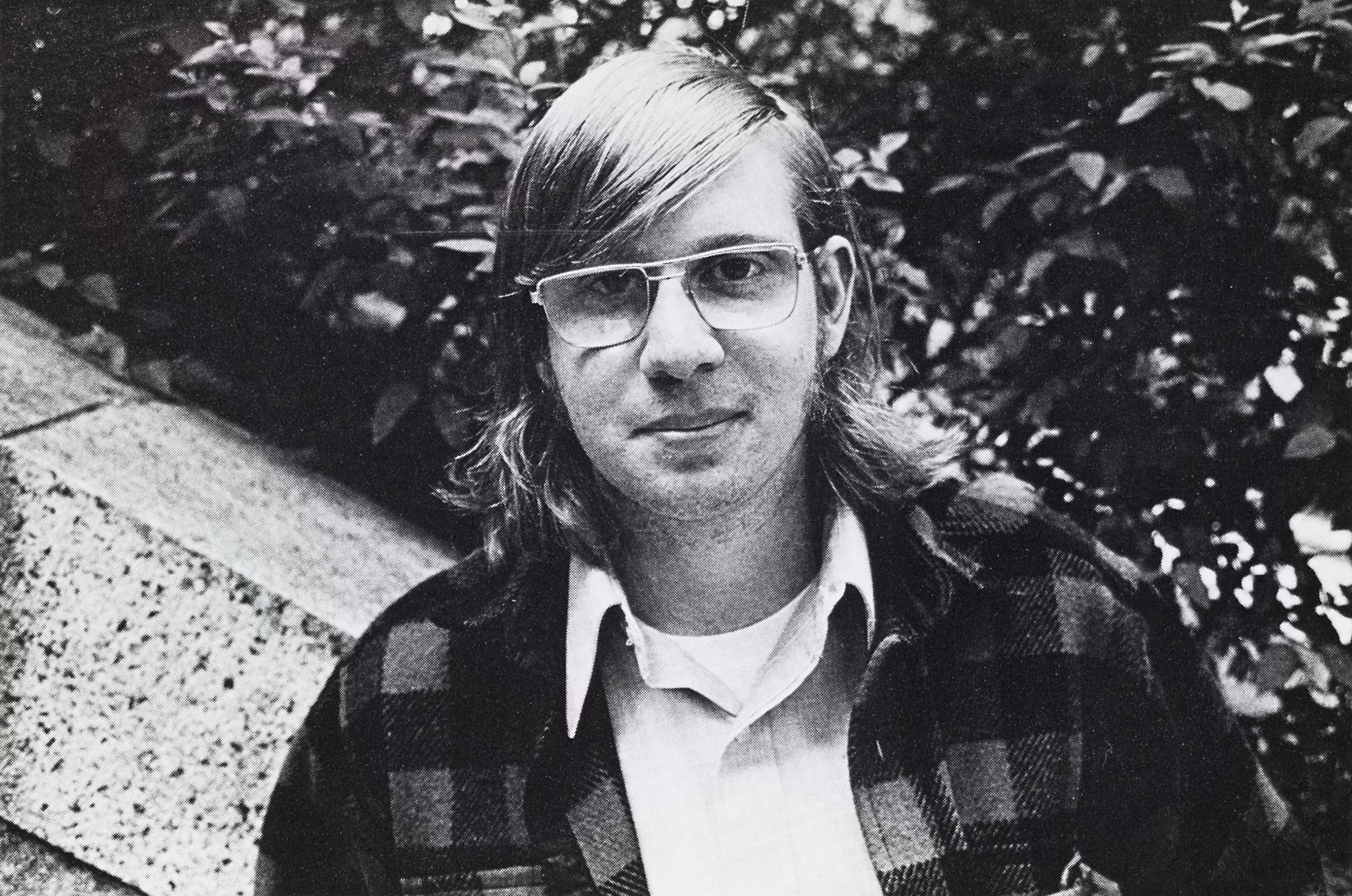
Kessler in the Amherst College yearbook, 1973

Born in Brooklyn and raised in Freeport, New York, Kessler graduated in 1969 from Woodmere Academy (since renamed Lawrence Woodmere Academy). After graduating from Amherst College in 1973, Kessler studied medicine at Harvard University. In 1975 he took a leave of absence from Harvard to study law and obtained a J.D. degree from the University of Chicago Law School in 1977, before returning to Harvard, obtaining an M.D. degree in 1979.

During his residency in pediatrics at Johns Hopkins Hospital in Baltimore, he was a consultant to Republican senator Orrin Hatch of Utah, particularly on the safety of food additives and on the regulation of cigarettes and tobacco. From 1984 to 1990, Kessler simultaneously ran a 431-bed teaching hospital in New York City and taught at the Columbia Law School and the Albert Einstein College of Medicine.

== As FDA commissioner ==
Although his appointment as FDA commissioner in 1990 by President George H. W. Bush won bipartisan approval, many of Kessler's actions were controversial, and he soon became more popular with Democrats than Republicans. He moved quickly to make the agency more efficient, reducing the time needed to approve or reject new drugs, including AIDS drugs, and more vigilant in protecting consumers against unsafe products and inflated label claims. It was also on his watch that FDA enacted regulations requiring standardized Nutrition Facts labels on food. In 1991, he had 24,000 US gallons (91,000 L; 20,000 imp gal) of Citrus Hill orange juice seized because, although made from concentrate, it was labeled "fresh." Kessler was reappointed to the post of FDA Commissioner during the administration of Bill Clinton.

Kessler is also known for his role in the FDA attempt to regulate cigarettes, which resulted in the FDA v. Brown & Williamson Tobacco Corp. case. The Supreme Court ultimately ruled that the FDA did not have the power to enact and enforce the regulations in question. He was awarded the Public Health Hero award on April 2, 2008, by the UC Berkeley School of Public Health for his work in tobacco regulation. Kessler published a book entitled A Question of Intent, which gave his view of his time at the FDA, focusing on his attempts to change tobacco legislation and the interpretation of that legislation, and his battle with the then-illegal, but still used Y1 strain of tobacco.

Kessler also oversaw the FDA-directed moratorium on silicone breast implant devices in 1992. This moratorium led to a deluge of lawsuits in the following months, many of which were filed prior to the federal judiciary's adoption of the Daubert standard for expert testimony in 1993. These lawsuits ultimately led to perhaps the largest settlement in the history of medical devices, Dow Corning's declaration of bankruptcy, and ongoing payments to individuals for conditions that have nothing to do with silicone. Scientific panels funded by three different government agencies conducted comprehensive assessments and later arrived independently at the same conclusion: that there was no connection between silicone gel implants and systemic disease. The FDA moratorium was lifted in 2006.

== After the FDA ==
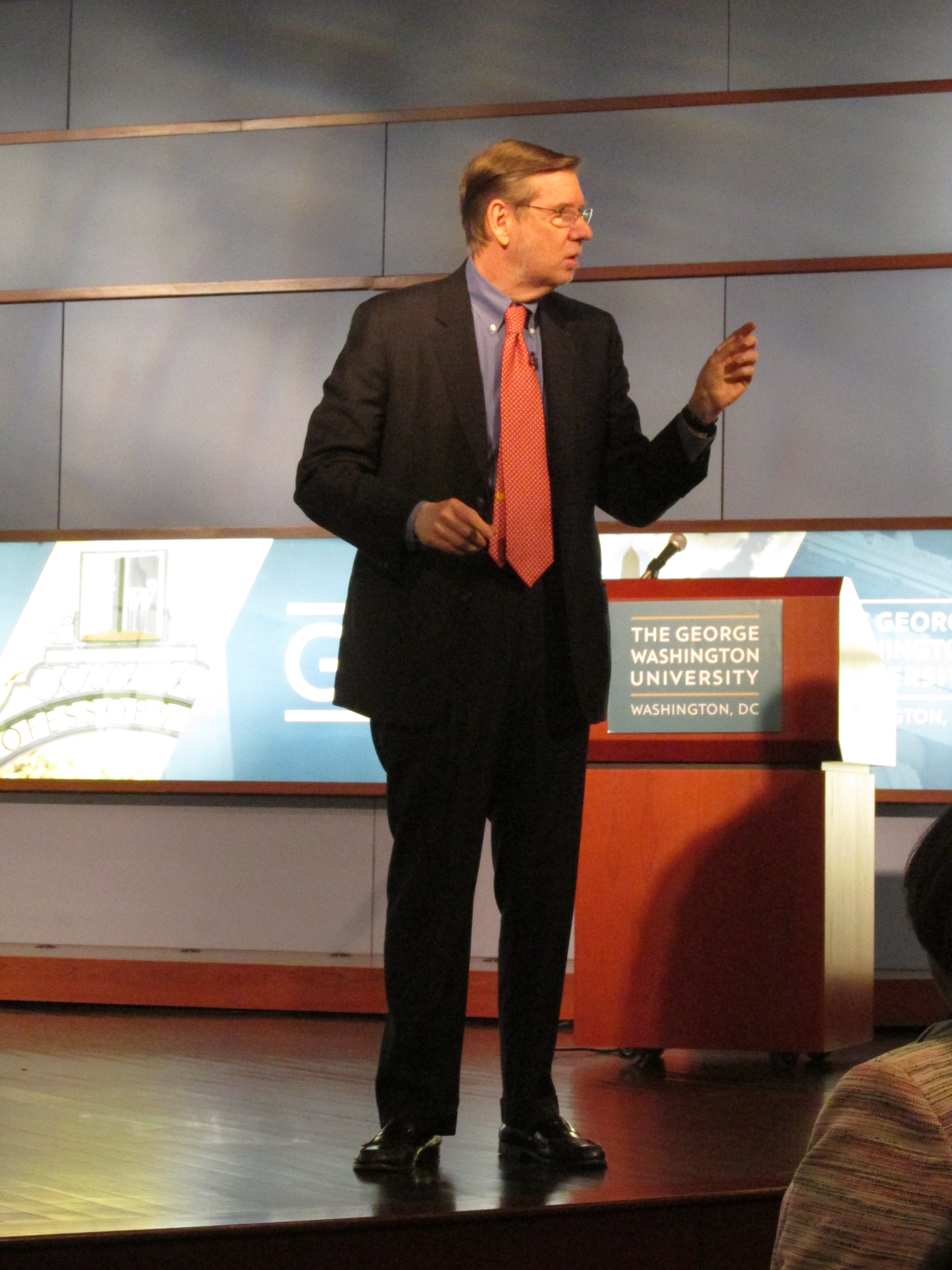
Kessler delivers a lecture at George Washington University in October 2013

Kessler left the FDA to join the Yale School of Medicine as dean from 1997 to 2003. He was awarded the Public Welfare Medal from the National Academy of Sciences in 2001. In 2003 he was recruited to a post as dean and vice-chancellor at the University of California, San Francisco Medical School. After his arrival at UCSF, Kessler uncovered multiple spreadsheets for the same closed fiscal year (a year prior to his recruitment), all showing different revenue and expense numbers, but indicating that the dean's office was in deficit and would continue to be so, in direct contravention of what had been reported to him during his recruitment, evidence of, at best, inadequate financial controls. J. Michael Bishop, Chancellor of UCSF, stated UC audits found no evidence of financial irregularities and, in June 2007, Bishop demanded Kessler's resignation. On December 13, 2007, Kessler was formally dismissed. Bishop then acknowledged that the financial data presented to Kessler during his recruitment might have been misleading. Kessler alleged he was fired for whistleblowing. Subsequent to Kessler's firing, after UCSF was pressured by KPMG to release one of the audits, it was revealed that Kessler had been correct.

His 2009 book entitled The End of Overeating (a New York Times best seller), highlights for the consumer the amount of fat, salt, and sugar in their food intake. He asserts that this trio of elements in restaurant and processed foods conditions us to eat more, in a manner that changes our brain circuitry, and that children may develop a pattern of overeating and obesity that they might retain for life. He stresses that this outcome of lifelong obesity is not genetic, but environmental and avoidable.

On November 9, 2020, Kessler was announced as one of the three co-chairs of president-elect Joe Biden's COVID-19 Advisory Board, alongside former U.S. Surgeon General Vivek Murthy and Yale public health professor Marcella Nunez-Smith. Days later, Kessler was named a candidate for United States Secretary of Health and Human Services in the Biden Administration. Kessler also served as chief medical adviser to the Biden Inaugural Committee, which organized Biden's 2021 presidential inauguration.

On January 15, 2021, the Biden administration announced that it had chosen Kessler to lead Operation Warp Speed, the program to facilitate and accelerate the development, manufacturing, and distribution of COVID-19 vaccines and other related treatment.

In 2025, Kessler filed a petition with the FDA seeking revocation of the “generally recognized as safe” (GRAS) status for certain sweeteners, refined flours, and other additives used in ultraprocessed foods, arguing that the agency has the authority to reassess their safety.

== Selected publications ==
- Kessler, David A., Diet, Drugs, and Dopamine: The New Science of Achieving a Healthy Weight (2025) ISBN 1250381274
- Kessler, David A., Fast Carbs, Slow Carbs: The Simple Truth About Food, Weight, and Disease (2020) ISBN 9780062996978
- Kessler, David A., Capture: Unraveling the Mystery of Mental Suffering (2016) ISBN 9780062388513
- Kessler, David A., Your Food Is Fooling You: How Your Brain Is Hijacked by Sugar, Fat, and Salt (2012) ISBN 9781596438316 (A version of The End of Overeating aimed at teens)
- Kessler, David A., The End of Overeating: Taking Control of the Insatiable American Appetite (2009) ISBN 1-60529-785-2
- Kessler, David A., A Question of Intent: A Great American Battle with a Deadly Industry (2001) ISBN 1-891620-80-0
- Kessler, David A.; Rose, Janet L.; Temple, Robert J.; Schapiro, Renie; Griffin, Joseph P. (1994). "Therapeutic-Class Wars -- Drug Promotion in a Competitive Marketplace". New England Journal of Medicine. 331 (20): 1350–1353. doi:10.1056/NEJM199411173312007. ISSN 0028-4793. PMID 7935706.
- Eisdorfer, Carl, David A. Kessler, and Abby N. Spector, eds. Caring for the Elderly: Reshaping Health Policy (1989) ISBN 978-0-8018-3810-1
