= Katrina Miranda =

American biochemist

- Education: Northern Arizona University; University of California, Santa Barbara
- Awards: PECASE (2008)
- Scientific career
- Workplaces: University of Arizona; National Cancer Institute; University of New Mexico School of Medicine

Katrina Miranda is an associate professor of biochemistry at the University of Arizona. She works on nitric oxide and their role in diseases like breast cancer, stroke and chronic pain.

== Early life and education ==
Miranda studied chemistry at Northern Arizona University. She moved to the University of California, Santa Barbara, and earned her PhD in 1996. Miranda was a postdoctoral fellow at the University of New Mexico School of Medicine.

== Research ==
Miranda studies the chemical and biological basis of redox signalling agents. She was a National Institutes of Health postdoctoral fellow at the National Cancer Institute from 1998 to 2002, before joining the University of Arizona. She looks to identify the biomarkers of disease development. They do this by investigating the molecular redox chemistry new donor systems and designing ways to detect biological signals. Nitric oxide is synthesised in the body when L-Arginine enzymatically oxidises. Miranda looked at what happens when nitric oxides accumulate, including their impact on chronic pain, strokes and breast cancer. She demonstrated that nitric oxide can modify how enzymes bind to metal centres. She studied the reactivity of azanone to clarify the activity of biomolecules. She published the textbook Chemical Biology of Nitric Oxide in 2008. Her research group attach chemical moieties that can improve drug delivery. They are using gene expression, genomic and proteomic techniques to analyse the cellular effects of redox active signalling.

Miranda runs outreach activities for faculty at the Arizona Community College to take part in research in her faculty. In 2013 she developed a massive open online course with Google that would explain abstract chemistry concepts to students around the world. In 2018 she filed a class action lawsuit against the University of Arizona for gender discrimination against women professors. She is not the first to sue the University of Arizona; emeritus dean Patricia MacCorquodale and former dean Janice Cervelli took them to court on behalf of women deans in early 2018.

=== Awards ===
- 2014 University of Arizona College of Science Distinguished Advising Award
- 2013 Fellow of the American Association for the Advancement of Science
- 2010 Graduate/Professional Students Achievement Award for Outstanding Mentor
- 2008 Presidential Early Career Award for Scientists and Engineers
