= Marcella Nunez-Smith =

United States Virgin Islander physician-scientist

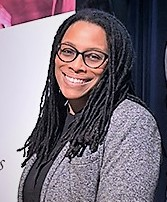
- Nuñez-Smith attends the National Institute on Minority Health and Health Disparities 10th Anniversary Symposium in 2020.

Chair of the COVID-19 Equity Task Force
- Incumbent
- Assumed office January 20, 2021
- President: Joe Biden
- Preceded by: Position established

Co-Chair of the COVID-19 Advisory Board
- In office November 9, 2020 – January 20, 2021 Serving with David A. Kessler, Vivek Murthy
- Preceded by: Position established
- Succeeded by: Position abolished

Personal details
- Born: Saint Thomas, U.S. Virgin Islands
- Education: Swarthmore College (BA); Thomas Jefferson University (MD); Yale University (MHS)

Marcella Nunez-Smith is an American physician-scientist. She is C.N.H Long Professor of medicine and epidemiology at the Yale School of Medicine, where she serves as the inaugural Associate Dean for Health Equity Research and founding director of the Equity Research and Innovation Center. She also holds joint appointments at the Yale School of Public Health and the Yale School of Management. After co-chairing the Biden-Harris transition's COVID-19 Advisory Board from November 2020 to January 2021, she was selected by President Joe Biden to serve as Senior Advisor to the White House COVID-19 Response Team and Chair of the Presidential COVID-19 Equity Task Force.

== Early life and education ==
Nunez-Smith grew up in Saint Thomas, U.S. Virgin Islands, where she attended All Saints Cathedral School. Her mother was a nursing professor who taught community health, and one of her godparents was a surgeon. Nunez-Smith obtained her Bachelor of Arts in biological anthropology and psychology from Swarthmore College in 1996. She attended medical school at Jefferson Medical College, where she was inducted into the Alpha Omega Alpha Medical Honor Society and graduated in 2001. Nunez-Smith was a resident in internal medicine at Brigham and Women's Hospital, Harvard Medical School. She completed her Master of Health Science at Yale University in 2006.

== Career ==
Nunez-Smith is C.N.H Long Professor of internal medicine, public health, and management at Yale School of Medicine. She is also the founding director at Equity Research and Innovation Center, Director of the Center for Research Engagement, Director of the Pozen-Commonwealth Fund Fellowship in Health Equity Leadership at Yale University, and Deputy Director of the Yale Center for Clinical Investigation.

In August 2020, Nunez-Smith was named Associate Dean for Health Equity Research at Yale.

=== COVID-19 ===
Nunez-Smith served as chair of the community sub-committee of the ReOpen Connecticut Advisory Group giving expert advice to the state of Connecticut. She has also been working with community partners in Puerto Rico and the U.S. Virgin Islands to overcome obstacles in testing, self-isolation, and quarantine.

A paper submitted in May 2020 of which Nunez-Smith was senior co-author considered state-level reporting of race and ethnicity of Covid cases and outcomes in the United States, for data up to April 2020, and found reporting from many states of this dimension to have been weak or lacking—an important omission, the paper argued, as from the data available it estimated that members of Black populations had encountered a 3.6 times greater risk of death, and members of Latin populations a 1.9 times greater risk of death, compared to White populations.

In November 2020, Nunez-Smith was named as one of three co-chairs of U.S. president-elect Joe Biden's COVID-19 Advisory Board. In January 2021, Biden appointed Nunez-Smith as the leader of his administration's task force on health equity. Under her direction, the Health Equity Task Force issued a report advising the Biden Administration on how to best support COVID-19 response and recovery efforts in communities hit hardest by the coronavirus pandemic.

== Research ==
Nunez-Smith's research centers around health and healthcare equity for structurally marginalized communities. In particular, she has studied adverse health and healthcare outcomes for those living in the Caribbean U.S. territories, including studies that show U.S. territory residents have a 17% greater risk of dying after a heart attack compared to those living on the U.S. mainland She has established the Eastern Caribbean Health Outcomes Research Network (ECHORN) to study early risk and protective factors for cancer, heart disease, and diabetes in the eastern Caribbean. Since its inception, ECHORN has both expanded research and leadership capacity in the region, and served as an international model for reducing the global burden of non-communicable diseases among structurally marginalized communities.

Nunez-Smith has developed a tool to assess patient reported experiences of discrimination in healthcare. Nunez-Smith has also investigated the experiences, promotion, and retention of diverse students and faculty at U.S. medical schools. Her research is funded by the National Cancer Institute and the National Institute on Minority Health and Health Disparities as well as other organizations.
