= Cathy Small =

American anthropologist

- Born: Cathy A. Small; 1949 (age 76–77); New York City, New York, U.S.
- Occupation: emeriti professor

Academic background
- Education: Temple University, Ph.D., 1987
- Thesis: Impact of immigration on the people of Tonga

Academic work
- Discipline: Anthropology
- Institutions: Northern Arizona University
- Notable works: Voyages (1997) My Freshman Year (2005) The Man in the Dog Park (2020)

Cathy A. Small (born 1949) is a cultural anthropologist and an emerita professor of anthropology at Northern Arizona University. She specializes in culture change, migration, and transnational studies with an emphasis on East Asia and the Pacific. In 2002, Small conducted a participant observation study of American university students and published her findings under the name Rebekah Nathan.

== Early life ==
Small was born in 1949 in New York and grew up in Brooklyn. She attended Temple University, graduating with a Ph.D. in anthropology in 1987. Her doctorate was about the "impact of immigration on the people of Tonga."

== Career ==
Small started teaching anthropology at Northern Arizona University (NAU) in 1987, eventually becoming a professor and graduate coordinator. Small's work in anthropology focused on understanding long-term social change. She has examined the rise and fall of social institutions, the long-term implications of social structures, and the ways culture changes. Her work is known for critical empathetic feminism and reflexivity.

=== Tongan islanders ===
Small's major ethnographic work focused on the immigration of Tongan islanders to the United States. She studied this population to understand long-term social change. As part of her research, she lived in Tonga for three years, working with a co-op of women who manufactured ceremonial cloth from Tapia tree bark.

Cornell University Press published her book, Voyages: From Tongan Villages to American Suburbs in 1997. Pacific Studies selected this book for scholarly review. More than 100 universities in the South Pacific region have adopted Voyages as a textbook. It was reissued with a new edition in 2011.

Small also created a virtual model of Polynesian society called TongaSim using C++.

=== Freshman Year ===
After teaching for fifteen years, Small realized she no longer understood the behavior and attitude of her students. In the fall of 2002, Small decided to apply anthropological methodology to the issue and developed a participant observation study focusing on the life and practices of American university students. She said, "Given that I'm an anthropologist, I knew the best way to get insight about a different culture was to go and live like them." She took a leave of absence from teaching and enrolled as a freshman at Northern Arizona University. At the time, Small was 52 years old.

For a year, Small attended typical first-year classes and completed homework. She paid for her tuition and expenses. To better understand first-year students' emotional, social, and academic experiences, Small moved into the dorm, hung out in the student lounge, ate in the dining hall, and participated in student clubs. She also sequestered herself from family and friends throughout the study.

To collect data, Small asked her fellow students a lot of questions. She visually observed interactions in the dining hall, such as seating preferences by race. She also conducted formal interviews with more than fifty residential students. Approximately half of the participants figured out she was a professor of anthropology at NAU. When asked, she described herself as a writer interested in experiencing university life. When pushed, Small did admit that she was a professor and asked the questioner for confidentiality.

While a student at NAU, Small collected data needed to form a theory about campus social life. Her work resulted in a book, My Freshman Year: What a Professor Learned by Becoming a Student, published by Cornell University Press in 2005. Smith published the book under the pseudonym Rebekah Nathan and referred to the university as AnyU to protect the students and the university. Before publishing the book, Small obtained informed consent from students she wanted to quote. In addition, she did not identify the students by name in the book. Small intended to offer enough ambiguity to provide privacy to her informants while they were still in school.

In the book, Small's main thesis was that college campuses are not in complete unity and do not have a sense of community, but rather the social life is more controlled by ego-centered networks. According to this theory, students self-select the people they want to associate with and plan their schedules around these friends. As a result, the university's efforts to create a community were often unappealing to students and, therefore, unsuccessful. Small noted that many of the ego-centered networks change frequently or are short-lived.

My Freshman Year stimulated discussions about the perceived intellectual laziness of university students. Small learned that academics were a small part of the typical student's day; most students indicated that they learned more from their social interactions. Students had difficulties engaging in university life if they lacked adequate financial support. Most students in Small's study worked while attending college. Rather than participating in political, philosophical, or intellectual classes and activities, these working students prioritized courses that promised to help them repay heavy student loans. The students also spent a lot of time discussing bodily functions.

A month before the book's release, New York Sun journalist Jacob Gershman reviewed My Freshman Year and correctly guessed the university and professor behind the pseudonyms. Gershman wrote, “Ms. Nathan, whether by choice or accident, also planted in her ethnographic study many clues about her identity." The book became the subject of a media frenzy. Small and Northern Arizona University admitted their connection to the book after a few days.

My Freshman Year started debates about the ethics of "going undercover" in research. Some questioned Smart's career motives for writing the book. Using pen names in anthropology has several precedents, including Elenore Smith Bowen (Laura Bohannan) and Cesara Manda (Karla Poewe). Similar ethnographic studies of student life have precedents, the most well-known being by Michael Moffatt and the team of Dorothy C. Holland and Margaret A. Eisenhart. However, Small was the first anthropologist to use pseudonyms to protect her informants, while also raising the issue of secrecy and ethnographic ethics in the same book. Small noted that she consulted the American Anthropological Association's Code of Ethics before developing her study, one critic noted that her "covert ethnography" was in direct opposition to the professional code that calls for openness with participants.

Small said the experience gave her more empathy for students and changed her approach to teaching.

=== Homelessness ===
In 2020, Small published The Man in the Dog Park: Coming Up Close to Homelessness with Cornell University Press. Her inspiration for the book was her ten-year relationship with Ross Moore, a disabled Vietnam veteran who experienced homelessness. Moore is a co-author of the book. Small writes, "As a society, we create the conditions for a slippery slope causing countless individuals to slide into homelessness, yet we disavow the results. This is the great delusion, really, that some win, some lose, but the laws, institutions, and policies we support (or fail to support) have little to do with it."

== Community service ==
In 1993, Small developed a catalog so the Hopi Arts & Crafts Coop Guild could market their crafts directly to consumers.

Small founded Pipeline Northern Arizona University after reading that Arizona had the second highest high school dropout rate in the United States. Pipeline NAU is a partnership between the university, Big Brothers/Big Sisters of Northern Arizona, and Flagstaff Unified School District No. 1. It pairs seventh-grade students with an NAU faculty or staff member who serves as a mentor for five years. Pipeline NAU started with the 1998–99 school year. Students who finish the program receive a four-year full scholarship to Northern Arizona University.

== Awards and honors ==
In 1997, Small received a grant from the National Science Foundation to model and simulate Polynesian social systems. She received the American Anthropology Association/Oxford University Press Award for Undergraduate Teaching of Anthropology for the 2008–09 academic year. She also received the Praxis Award for Excellence in Applied Anthropology.

For her work with Pipeline NAU, Small received the National Points of Light Award, the Arizona Governor's Special Recognition, and the Best Educational Practices in Post-Secondary Education in the State of Arizona Award.

== Personal life ==
Small is married to her spouse, Phyllis, whom she has been with since 1990. Her religious heritage is Judaism. She has practiced vipassana meditation for more than twenty-five years and has taught meditation since 2010. She teaches meditation at the Flagstaff Insight Meditation Community in Flagstaff, Arizona. Each semester, she also co-teachers a six-week-long mindfulness course at Northern Arizona University for faculty, staff, and community members.

== Selected publications ==
=== As Cathy A. Small ===
- "The Birth and Growth of a Polynesian Women's Exchange Network." Oceania, vol.65, no, 3 (1995) pp. 234–256.
- Voyages: From Tongan Villages to American Suburbs (Cornell University Press, 1997) ISBN 978-0801434129
- "Finding an Invisible History: A Computer Simulation Experiment in Virtual Polynesia." Journal of Artificial Societies and Social Simulation vol. 2, no. 3 (October 31, 1999)
- TongaSim (built using C++).
- Voyages: From Tongan Villages to American Suburbs 2nd edition (Cornell University Press, 2011) ISBN 9780801477393
- The Man in the Dog Park: Coming Up Close to Homelessness. with Jason Kordosky and Ross Moore. Cornell University Press, 2020. ISBN 978-1501748783

=== As Rebekah Nathan ===
- My Freshman Year: What a Professor Learned by Becoming a Student (Cornell University Press, 2005) ISBN 978-0143037477
