= Nils Daulaire =

American physician and government official (born 1948)

Dr. Nils Daulaire
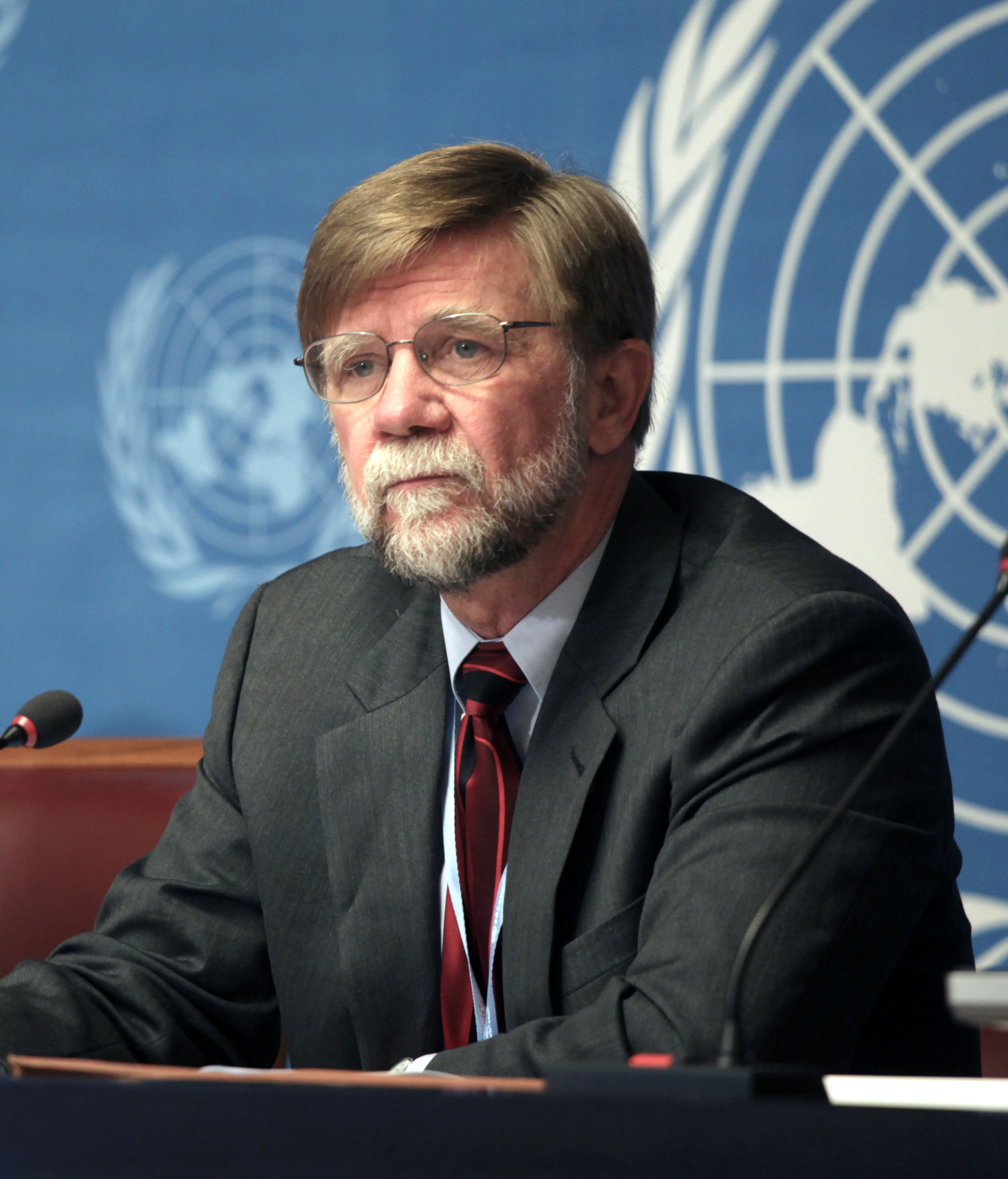
- Born: November 24, 1948 (age 77)
- Education: Johns Hopkins (M.P.H.), Harvard Medical School (M.D.), Harvard College (B.A.)
- Occupations: 1st Assistant Secretary of the Office of Global Affairs, HHS
- Known for: Public Health
- Spouse: Mary Taylor
- Children: 2

Nils Daulaire (born November 24, 1948) is an American physician and the former assistant secretary for global affairs at the United States Department of Health and Human Services (HHS). Daulaire has been at HHS since 2010, and became assistant secretary in December 2012. He also served as the U.S. representative on the World Health Organization’s (WHO) executive board, a post he was nominated to by President Barack Obama.

== Early life and education ==
Daulaire received a bachelor's degree in folklore and mythology from Harvard College in 1970, where he graduated summa cum laude and Phi Beta Kappa. He received his medical degree from Harvard Medical School in 1976, with residency in training at the University of Colorado. He earned a Master of Public Health degree from the Johns Hopkins School of Hygiene and Public Health in 1978.

== Career ==
Daulaire began his career working in primary health programs in Asia, Africa and Latin America, where he carried out field research on child survival. During his two decades conducting fieldwork in maternal and child health, he spent five years in residence in Nepal, where he served as senior advisor to the Ministry of Health. He also served in Mali as a technical advisor on primary health. He has worked extensively in Haiti, Bangladesh and other low-income countries.

Daulaire has directed multiple child health research projects, especially in the areas of community-based management of childhood pneumonia and vitamin A supplementation.

From 1993 to 1998, Daulaire served as deputy assistant administrator for policy and senior international health advisor for the U.S. Agency for International Development (USAID). At USAID, he oversaw an integrated global strategy that encompassed programs totaling more than $1 billion annually. He was responsible for health, population, girls’ education, and other social sector programs.

From 1998 until his appointment at HHS in 2010, Daulaire was the president and CEO of the Global Health Council, an international nonprofit membership organization that represents global health service providers and policy advocates. While there, he promoted public health causes in developing countries.

Daulaire has testified before the United States Congress on numerous occasions, represented the United States at five WHO annual assemblies and has been the lead U.S. negotiator at a number of international meetings on health including:

- The Cairo International Conference on Population and Development (1994)
- The Beijing World Conference of Women (1995)
- The Rome World Food Summit (1996)

=== Academia and accreditation ===
Daulaire is board certified in preventive medicine and public health.

He has been professor of global health at the University of Washington, professor of community and family medicine at Dartmouth Medical School, and a senior visiting scholar on global health security at the Norwegian Institute of Public Health.

Daulaire served as a Richard L. and Ronay A. Menschel Senior Leadership Fellow at Harvard T.H. Chan School of Public Health in 2016. He taught a course in the department of global health and population titled, "Making Policy Leadership Matter for Global Health: Navigating Choppy Political Seas in the Real World." Daulaire also participated as a speaker on Voices in Leadership, an original Harvard T.H. Chan School of Public Health webcast series, in a session titled, "Negotiating Act Three for Global Health on the World’s Stage."

Daulaire has been elected to membership in both the Institute of Medicine and the Council on Foreign Relations.
