= Citrus Hill =

Brand of orange juice

Citrus Hill was a brand of orange juice introduced by Procter & Gamble in the United States market in 1982, later used for other fruit juices and beverages.

== History ==
=== Launch ===
The launch of Citrus Hill occurred when P&G acquired Florida-based Ben Hill Griffin Inc. and created a brand to sell its juice products under, with national distribution. This thrust P&G into the competitive orange juice market, dominated by Minute Maid and Tropicana Products. Procter & Gamble hoped to differentiate Citrus Hill from the other major brands by marketing it as a premium product, based on a patented freeze-concentration process that retained more volatile organic aroma compounds associated with fresh-squeezed juice than did the industry-standard evaporative heat concentration (US Patents 4,463,025; 4,818,555; 4,889,739; 4,938,985; 4, 971,813; and 4,971,811).

=== Branding issues with the FDA ===
That proved unsuccessful in a segment with technology limiting the 1980s orange juice market to made-from-concentrate products of generally equal quality differentiated by price and perceived value. Citrus Hill had the distinction of introducing the first calcium-enriched orange juice in 1986, which was largely met with indifference from consumers.

Citrus Hill would trudge along in a distant third place throughout its life, and a desperate attempt at rebranding would spell the demise for the brand. In 1990, Citrus Hill changed the name of its orange juice to Citrus Hill Fresh Select, with the word "Fresh" emphasized boldly and a small disclaimer stating that it was "Fresh from Concentrate."

In June 1990, Commissioner David Aaron Kessler of the Food & Drug Administration declared that the use of "fresh" was a misnomer and a violation of 1963 rules governing processed orange juice, which P&G denied. The FDA would exchange correspondence with Procter & Gamble from that point forward while Citrus Hill continued with the same marketing, but negotiations broke down on April 24, 1991. The same day, the FDA seized 12,000 gallons of Fresh Select orange juice from a warehouse in Minneapolis stating that it was improperly labeled and that their claims of "fresh" were false advertising.

P&G agreed to stop using the term "fresh" to describe its juice, but at that point, the seizure had become headline news nationwide. Footage of Citrus Hill juice being seized during television news broadcasts and in newspaper pictures decimated consumer confidence in the brand and affected sales heavily.

The brand was gradually wound down, and efforts to find a buyer proved unsuccessful.

In 1994, PepsiCo would license the Citrus Hill brand for a line of fruit-flavoured fountain beverages, which ended when Pepsi acquired Tropicana in 1998 and rebranded the drink line to the Tropicana brand. The former Citrus Hill processing facility in Florida is now owned by Cargill.
