= Political positions of Rand Paul =

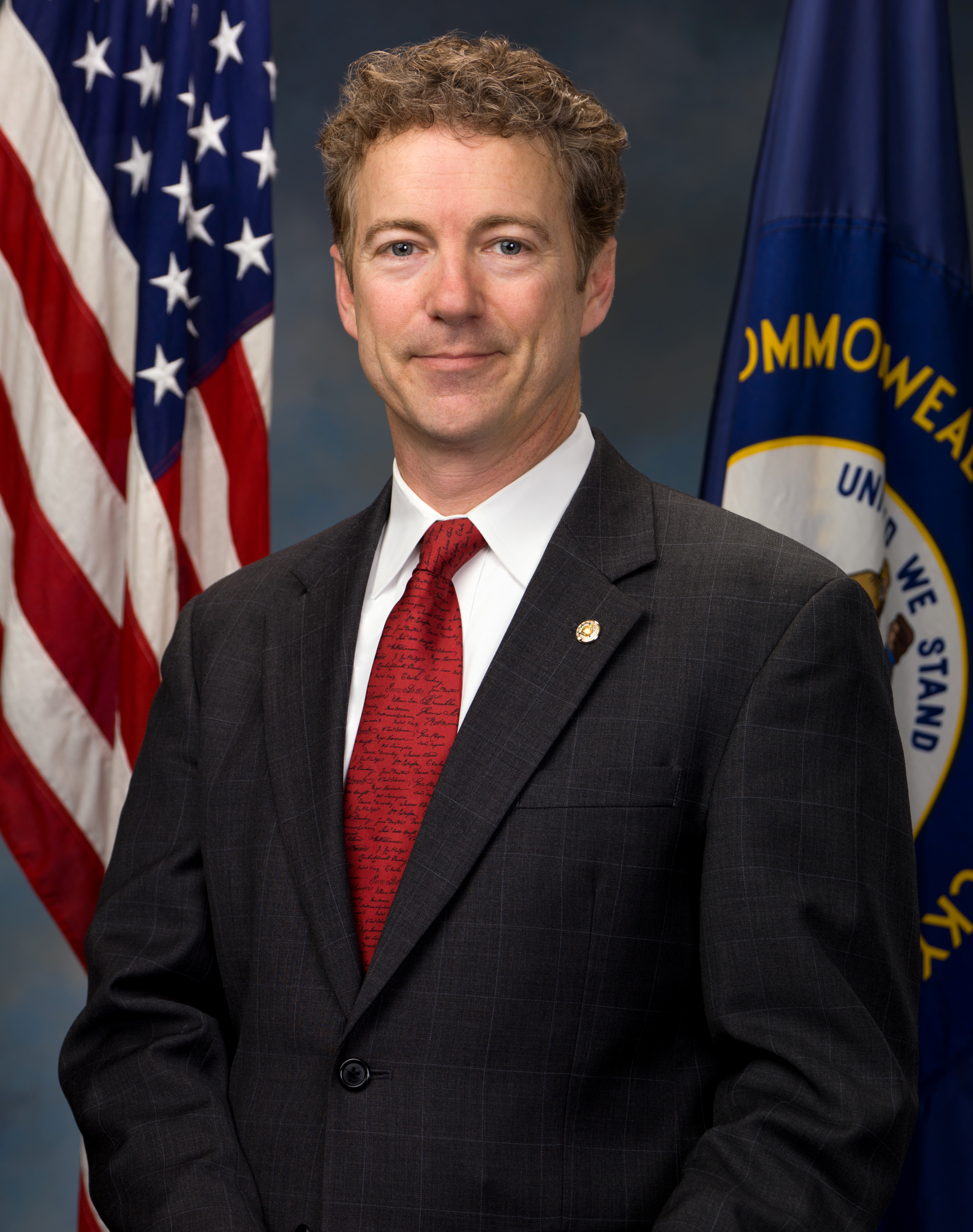
Rand Paul's official portrait for the 112th Congress

Rand Paul is a member of the Republican Party, a U.S. Senator representing the state of Kentucky since 2011, and a former candidate for president of the United States. His voting record was rated 26% liberal in 2011 by National Journal.

Paul identifies as both a "constitutional conservative" and a "libertarian conservative."

== Domestic policy ==
=== Economic and fiscal policy ===
Paul is a libertarian conservative on economic issues, and believes the federal government should be limited, taxes should be low, spending and foreign aid should be cut, and the U.S. federal budget should be balanced. Paul has sought to reduce the funds lent by the Export-Import Bank of the United States to countries that hold U.S. debt. He compared the practice to corporate welfare and stated that it was wrong that "we borrow billions of dollars from China, India, and Saudi Arabia then we loan it back to them again."

==== Budget ====
For his 2016 presidential campaign, he stated, "As president of the United States, I will work to balance our budget and only spend what comes in. We must cut spending in all areas, particularly areas that are better run by state and local governments." Paul supports cutting government federal spending, a balanced budget amendment, and lowering taxes. He has criticized both Republicans and Democrats on deficit spending. Paul has been a longtime opponent of the Emergency Economic Stabilization Act of 2008.

==== Federal Reserve ====
For his presidential campaign, he stated that he wanted to audit the Federal Reserve. Paul opposes the Federal Reserve Act of 1913 and the Federal Reserve's control of the money supply and interest rates, has advocated allowing the free market to regulate interest rates, and supports Congress' constitutional role in controlling the money supply. Paul endorses the Federal Reserve Transparency Act, a bill originally introduced by his father as HR 1207 and reintroduced in the 114th U.S. Congress as S 264 (by Senator Paul), and as HR 24 (by Rep. Thomas Massie), mandating an audit of the Federal Reserve. Paul has also expressed support for abolition of the Federal Reserve.

==== Taxes ====
Paul supports a flat 14.5% tax rate on all Americans. In each year from 2011 through 2013, Paul has received a grade of A from the National Taxpayers Union, a conservative taxpayers advocacy organization.

In 2014, with attorney James Bopp and Republicans Overseas, among others, Paul sued the IRS, challenging the constitutionality of FATCA, in Crawford v. U.S. Department of Treasury, which argued that FATCA and related intergovernmental agreements violated the Senate's power with respect to treaties, the Excessive Fines Clause of the Eighth Amendment, or the Fourth Amendment right against unreasonable search and seizures. In 2016, the U.S. District Court for the Southern District of Ohio dismissed the suit, determining that the plaintiffs lacked standing. In 2017, the U.S. Court of Appeals for the Sixth Circuit upheld the dismissal. In 2017, Rand introduced S 869 to Congress, in an effort to repeal FATCA.

==== Trade ====
The Cato Institute's Center for Trade Policy Studies has identified Paul as a "free trader" during his Senate tenure, indicating a pro-free trade, pro-market, and anti-subsidies voting record. In January 2018, Paul was one of 36 Republican senators to sign a letter to President Trump requesting he preserve the North American Free Trade Agreement by modernizing it for the current and future economy.

=== Energy and the environment ===
Paul does not accept the overwhelming scientific consensus on climate change, claiming that it is "not conclusive." Paul has said that pollution emissions are subject to "onerous regulation," and supports allowing the free market to determine which forms of energy to use. He opposes subsidizing energy companies, but would support allowing tax breaks for companies that produce alternative energy such as wind, solar, or geothermal. He has said that subsidizing the energy industry will only add incentive for companies to lobby the federal government.

=== National security and defense policy ===
Paul opposes the USA PATRIOT Act, including warrantless searches. He has also proposed eliminating the Transportation Security Administration and opposes the extrajudicial killing of American citizens in the United States who are terrorism suspects. He opposes the domestic use of drones as a means of surveillance, deeming it a violation of "the right to privacy that all Americans have", but supports drones being used in response to an imminent threat.

Paul voted against the National Defense Authorization Act for Fiscal Year 2012 (NDAA) and 2013, both of which contain provisions in it that allow the U.S. government to indefinitely detain its citizens without due process.

He did however vote for the Feinstein-Lee NDAA Amendment to Section 1033 in the NDAA 2013, which states: "An authorization to use military force, a declaration of war, or any similar authority shall not authorize the detention without charge or trial of a citizen or lawful permanent resident of the United States apprehended in the United States, unless an Act of Congress expressly authorizes such detention." Civil liberties groups, such as the ACLU, were concerned with this amendment because they think anyone on American soil should be given a trial if accused of a crime, given that the U.S. Constitution protects "persons," rather than "citizens." and also worried that the amendment could be construed to actually imply that the U.S. government has the constitutional authority for indefinite detention without charge and trial.

=== Abortion and bioethics ===
Paul opposes abortion. However, in a 2013 interview, he said that he would not oppose abortion in some individual cases involving a woman's health. He opposes the use of federal, state, or local government funds for abortion.

During a 2014 CNN interview with Pete Hamby, he said that he supported the use of medications (such as the morning-after pill) to prevent pregnancy because Plan B is basically "taking two birth control pills in the morning and two in the evening and I'm not opposed to that."

Describing himself as "100% pro life," Paul has said, "I believe life begins at conception and it is the duty of our government to protect this life.... I have stated many times that I will always vote for any and all legislation that would end abortion or lead us in the direction of ending abortion." He has been a sponsor or cosponsor of several legislative measures to effectively ban virtually all abortions by recognizing a legal right to life of human embryos from the moment of fertilization.

Paul favors a federal ban on abortion, but he has said that until the U.S. Supreme Court overturns Roe v. Wade or the nation passes a constitutional amendment to ban abortions nationwide, the legality of abortion should be left to the individual states to decide without federal involvement.

During his senate campaign, Paul said he received a 100% pro-life score on a Kentucky Right to Life survey and said he had indicated on the survey form that he opposed human cloning for use in embryonic stem-cell research or medical treatments. This was disputed by Kentucky Right to Life, however, who endorsed Paul's primary opponent instead and said that Paul had not, in fact, answered the stem-cell research question. As reported by the Cincinnati Enquirer at the time, the Kentucky Right to Life produced a hard-copy of the survey form from Paul showing that he had not answered the question while his campaign produced an electronic copy of the form showing that he had answered the question. He received a perfect score from the National Right to Life Committee.

=== Civil rights ===
Rand Paul's views on civil rights have evolved over time, particularly on the issue of the Civil Rights Act of 1964. In the early 2010s, Paul expressed some opposition to the Civil Rights Act, arguing that it violated the rights of private business owners to discriminate against their customers. However, in recent years, Paul has softened his stance on the Civil Rights Act. In 2014, he praised the act during a commemoration of its 50th anniversary. He said that the act had changed the future of the nation by enforcing the belief that all men and women are created equal.

Paul has spoken out against racial discrimination, particularly with in law enforcement and the U.S. prison system.

==== LGBT rights ====
Paul opposes protecting sexual orientation or gender identity at the federal level, supports marriage privatization (since June 28, 2015), "contracts between adults", opposes the Equality Act of 2015, supported the United States v. Windsor ruling declaring Section 3 of the Defense of Marriage Act unconstitutional," opposed the Employment Non-Discrimination Act of 2013, supported the Obama Administration policy of tying foreign aid to LGBT rights, said he doesn't believe in the concept of gay rights because he didn't believe in "rights based on your behavior," opposed the Violence Against Women Reauthorization Act of 2011 and 2013, supports a neutral federal tax code on marriage, supports Indiana's Religious Freedom Restoration Act, supports the First Amendment Defense Act, opposes Executive Order 12968, Executive Order 13087, and Executive Order 13672. His views on LGBT rights are inconsistent with libertarian perspectives on LGBT rights, given his support for Indiana's Religious Freedom Restoration Act and First Amendment Defense Act. He has received support from prominent LGBT libertarians/conservatives such as Peter Thiel and Gregory Angelo. In 2010, he supported a constitutional amendment to ban same-sex marriage nationwide.

On the basis of his support for policy-based protections for LGBT people, the Human Rights Campaign gave him a score of 47% for the 112th United States Congress. Between 2011 and 2013, he didn't co-sponsor the Employment Non-Discrimination Act, the Respect for Marriage Act, the Tax Parity for Health Plan Beneficiaries Act, the Uniting American Families Act, the Tax Parity for Health Plan Beneficiaries Act, the Uniting American Families Act, and the Domestic Partnership Benefits and Obligations Act.

The Human Rights Campaign gave Paul a score of 20% for the 113th U.S. Congress. During his 113th career, he didn't co-sponsor the Employment Non-Discrimination Act, the Respect for Marriage Act, the Student Non-Discrimination Act, and the Safe Schools Improvement Act.

===== Views on Don't Ask, Don't Tell =====
In May 2010, Paul told the Louisville Courier-Journal that he thinks "Don't ask, don't tell" has "worked relatively well" and supported a "non-fraternization" policy for everyone in the U.S. military. In August 2010, he completed a voter guide that indicated he was in favor of enforcing the policy.

On September 23, 2010, Paul's campaign spokesman, Gary Howard, said in an e-mail about Paul's position on "Don't ask, don't tell" that, "Dr. Paul believes this is a matter that should be decided by the leadership of the military, not through political posturing."

===== Views on same-sex marriage =====
In 2009, Paul stated that he opposes same-sex marriage and believes the issue of same-sex marriage should be left to the states to decide. In August 2010 in a voter guide, Paul answered in support of a Federal Marriage Amendment to prevent same-sex marriage.

On May 12, 2012, Paul said at the Iowa Faith and Freedom Coalition that "Call me cynical, but I wasn't sure his views on marriage could get any gayer."

On January 30, 2013, Rand, appearing on Focal Point, stated that he believes in "traditional marriage" and didn't "understand any other kind of marriage." He also expressed support for Kentucky's state constitutional ban and stated that states should decide the issue and the federal government shouldn't be involved. When asked about the Defense of Marriage Act, he was "not sure" what his position was on it.

On March 24, 2013, Paul suggested on Fox News that he wouldn't mind if the U.S. Supreme Court struck down "the federalization part" of the Defense of Marriage Act and he believes the issue should be left up to the states.

On June 26, 2013, Paul told ABC News that the U.S. Supreme Court ruling in United States v. Windsor was appropriate and the issue should be left to the states. He stated that "As a country we can agree to disagree," and "As a Republican Party, that's kind of where we are as well. The party is going to have to agree to disagree on some of these issues." He praised and agreed with Justice Anthony Kennedy for preventing a "culture war", whom he called "someone who doesn't just want to be in front of opinion but wants government to keep up with opinion." He said Kennedy "tried to strike a balance." Also that same day, while talking with Glenn Beck, Paul responded to Glenn Beck by asking whether or not the United States v. Windsor has to apply only to humans, but later clarified his remarks on Fox News by saying "I don't think it will be with multiple humans and I think it will be human and human."

On August 6, 2014, Paul said he is "in favor of the concept," of a constitutional amendment banning same-sex marriage, along with saying "And the loss of the idea of marriage is probably the leading cause of poverty in our country," but he also said "I don't want to register my guns in Washington or my marriage,"

On October 3, 2014, Paul told CNN that "I believe in old-fashioned traditional marriage but I don't really think the government needs to be too involved in this and I think the Republican Party can have people on both sides of the issue," and when asked if he could rethink his own position at some point he then threw his hands up in a half-shrug, half-grimace.

On June 28, 2015, after the Obergefell v. Hodges ruling, Paul stated that he disagreed with the ruling and that government should get out of the marriage business altogether.

On July 6, 2015, Paul cosponsored the First Amendment Defense Act, which would defend people who view marriage as being between one man and one woman.

===== Views on legal protections for LGBT people =====
====== 112th Congress (2011-2013) ======
In August 2010 in a voter guide, Paul opposed making sexual preference a protected minority status under existing civil rights laws.

On April 26, 2012, Paul voted against the Hutchison Amendment to the Violence Against Women Reauthorization Act of 2011, which would have stripped key provisions prohibiting discrimination against, and expanding services to, victims of domestic violence based on sexual orientation or gender identity. That same day, he voted against the Violence Against Women Reauthorization Act of 2011.

====== 113th Congress (2013-2015) ======
On February 4, 2013, Paul voted against a motion to proceed the Violence Against Women Reauthorization Act of 2013. On February 7, 2013, he voted against Grassley Amendment to the Violence Against Women Reauthorization Act of 2013 that would have stripped key provisions prohibiting discrimination against, and expanding services to, victims of domestic violence based on sexual orientation or gender identity. On February 12, 2013, he voted against the Violence Against Women Reauthorization Act of 2013.

On March 12, 2013, during an interview with the National Review, Paul said he wanted the federal tax code neutral on marriage and expressed support for contracts between adults.

On May 12, 2013, Paul told Commonwealth Network 2 in an interview that "I don't think I've ever used the words 'gay rights' because I really don't believe in rights based on your behavior."'

On July 10, 2013, Paul voted against the Employment Non-Discrimination Act of 2013 in the Senate Committee on Health, Education, Labor and Pensions. Paul had introduced an amendment to broaden the religious exemption, but then he did not show up for the committee hearing. On the same day, he said "All I can say is, we have a zero tolerance policy for anybody who displays discriminatory behavior or belief in discriminating against people based on the color of their skin, their religion, their sexual orientation, anything like that," On November 4, 2013, he voted against cloture for the Employment Non-Discrimination Act of 2013. On November 7, 2013, he voted in favor Senator Pat Toomey's amendment, which would have excepted employees, who engages in secular activities as well as religious activities, shall not be subject to this act if the employee is employed by substantial part owned, controlled, or managed by a particular religion or by a particular religious corporation, association, or society. On November 7, 2013, he voted again against cloture for the Employment Non-Discrimination Act of 2013. On November 7, 2013, he voted again against the Employment Non-Discrimination Act of 2013. ON November 14, 2013, after the Senate passage of the Employment Non-Discrimination Act, he stated that his vote had nothing to do with supporting employment discrimination, but his support for Toomey's amendment that would exempt religious groups to the bill. After Toomey's amendment was defeated in the Senate, he said it was nearly impossible for him to support Employment Non-Discrimination Act as it stood, thus leaving the possibility of him voting for a future Employment Non-Discrimination Act bill, but only with stronger religious exceptions to it.

In 2014, Paul, talking about Arizona SB 1062, which would allow private businesses to potentially refuse service to LGBT people on the basis of the owner's religious affiliation, said "I think that the right to associate and the right to be free in your business decisions is out there," and "I'm not real excited about laws that sort of say you can deny people service."

====== 114th Congress (2015-2017) ======
On March 24, 2015, in an interview with Bloomberg, Paul would continue to support the Obama Administration policy of tying foreign aid to LGBT rights.

On August 31, 2015, Paul stated about the Kim Davis case that "Whether or not people who still work for the state can do it without the legislature changing it is something I'm going to leave up to the courts exactly how to do it."

===== Actions against LGBT public officials =====
On July 18, 2011, Paul voted against the nomination of J. Paul Oetken to serve as U.S. District Judge for the Southern District of New York, making him the first-ever openly gay male Article III judge in history, and October 13, 2011, he voted against the nomination of Alison J. Nathan to serve as U.S. District Judge for the Southern District of New York, making her the second openly lesbian Article III judge in history.

On December 12, 2013, Paul voted against cloture of the nomination of Chai Rachel Feldblum to serve a second term as a commissioner on the Equal Employment Opportunity Commission. On the same day, he voted against the nomination of Chai Rachel Feldblum.

During a committee hearing on the confirmation hearing of Dr. Rachel Levine as assistant secretary for health, Paul asked her about genital mutilation on February 25, 2021. Levine is transgender.

===== Other views =====
On October 21, 2014, at Allen County Republican BBQ and Rally, Paul said he "can't understand why you have to have three bathrooms."

On February 24, 2015, Light Wins: How to Overcome the Criminalization of Christianity premiered featuring Paul in the documentary. The documentary was controversial because it featured ex-homosexuals and Scott Lively, who claimed credit for Russian LGBT propaganda law and is linked to the 2014 Uganda Anti-Homosexuality Act.

On August 6, 2015, Paul was asked during the first GOP presidential debate of 2016 from Fox News panelist Megyn Kelly that "What would you do to ensure Christians are not prosecuted for speaking out against gay marriage and will Christians be forced to conduct business that conflicts with their religious beliefs?" He responded that "Look, I don't want my marriage or my guns registered in Washington, and if people have an opinion, it's a religious opinion that's heartily felt, obviously they should be allowed to practice that, and no government should interfere with that." From there, Paul launched into an attack on Houston's openly lesbian mayor, Annise Parker, though he did not mention her by name. "One of the things that really got to me was the thing in Houston, where you had the government, the mayor actually trying to get the sermons of ministers," and "When the government tries to invade the church to enforce its own opinion on marriage, that's when it's time to resist." he said.

==== Police militarization ====
In a 2014 op-ed in Time, Paul criticized the increased militarization of law enforcement. Paul noted: "When you couple this militarization of law enforcement with an erosion of civil liberties and due process that allows the police to become judge and jury—national security letters, no-knock searches, broad general warrants, pre-conviction forfeiture—we begin to have a very serious problem on our hands." Paul has stated that the criminal justice system unjustly impacts African Americans, noting that "anyone who thinks that race does not still, even if inadvertently, skew the application of criminal justice in this country is just not paying close enough attention," and believes the militarization of police has been caused by the federal government through subsidies, equipment, and other incentives as well as the drug war by its creation of a "culture of violence."

==== Anti-discrimination legislation ====
In a 2002 letter to Bowling Green, Kentucky's Daily News, Paul said that the Fair Housing Act "ignores the distinction between private and public property." He added: "Decisions concerning private property and associations should in a free society be unhindered. As a consequence, some associations will discriminate." In April 2010, in an interview for the Louisville Courier-Journal, he said "I think it's a bad business decision to exclude anybody from your restaurant — but, at the same time, I do believe in private ownership." On May 20, 2010, in an interview on MSNBC's The Rachel Maddow Show, he suggested he would have wanted to modify one section of the Civil Rights Act that dealt with private institutions, while keeping the parts prohibiting discrimination in the public sector. On May 22, 2010, in an interview on CNN's The Situation Room, he expressed there was "a need for federal intervention" and declared he would have voted for the law. Glenn Kessler of The Washington Post felt there Paul had discrepancies on whether private enterprise could discriminate.

In April 2013, in a speech at Howard University, he said "It's a mischaracterization of my position. I've never been against the Civil Rights Act, ever, and I continue to be for the Civil Rights Act as well as the Voting Rights Act. There was one interview that had a long, extended conversation about the ramifications beyond race, and I have been concerned about the ramifications of certain portions of the Civil Rights Act beyond race, as they are now being applied to smoking, menus, listing calories and things on menus, and guns. And so I do question some of the ramifications and the extensions but I never questioned the Civil Rights Act and never came out in opposition to the Civil Rights Act or ever introduced anything to alter the Civil Rights Act."

On July 10, 2013, he voted against the Employment Non-Discrimination Act, that would prohibit discrimination in hiring and employment on the basis of sexual orientation or gender identity by private sector employers with at least 15 employees. Paul had introduced an amendment to broaden the religious exemptions to the Employment Non-Discrimination Act, but failed to show up for the committee hearing for it. A day after the vote, he said "All I can say is, we have a zero tolerance policy for anybody who displays discriminatory behavior or belief in discriminating against people based on the color of their skin, their religion, their sexual orientation, anything like that," In November 2013, he once again voted against the Employment Non-Discrimination Act. After the Senate passage of the Employment Non-Discrimination Act, he stated that his vote had nothing to do with supporting employment discrimination, but his support for Senator Pat Toomey's amendment that would exempt religious groups to the bill. After Toomey's amendment was defeated in the Senate, Paul said it was nearly impossible for him to support Employment Non-Discrimination Act as it stood, thus leaving the possibility of him voting for a future Employment Non-Discrimination Act bill, but only with stronger religious exceptions to it.

==== Felon disenfranchisement ====
Paul supported a Kentucky bill that would restore voting rights to felons after a five-year waiting period. The current system requires felons to petition the governor for a partial pardon.

=== Education ===
Paul supports returning control of education to local communities and parents and thus eliminating the federal Department of Education, but he says that some functions of the department, such as disbursing student loans and Pell Grants, should be transferred to other departments instead of being eliminated. Paul opposes federal regulation of homeschooling. Paul has also authored and shown support for school voucher legislation and competitive public schooling. He also voted against the Every Student Succeeds Act.

=== Gun control ===
Paul generally opposes gun control legislation, a position he says is supported by the Second Amendment.

=== Healthcare ===
In response to a question from radio host Laura Ingraham in February 2015, Paul said that while he is not "anti-vaccine" at all, he does think they should be voluntary. Closing Bell co-anchor Kelly Evans attacked Paul's position during an interview with him on CNBC, to which Paul responded that some parents have fears, as he has "heard of many tragic cases of walking, talking normal children who wound up with profound mental disorders after vaccines." Paul clarified his comments a few days later, stating that, "The point is that I have heard of – I mean who hasn't ever met a child who has a profound disability and in the parents' mind they see a connection. But I didn't allege there is a connection. I said I heard of people who believe there is a connection. I do think that vaccines are a good idea. I've been vaccinated. My kids have been vaccinated."

Paul, a medical doctor who practiced ophthalmology prior to seeking political office, opposes federal government involvement in healthcare. He has stated that he would repeal the HMO Act of 1973 that "drives a wedge between the patient and his doctor". He believes that government has driven up the cost of healthcare and causes the quality and coverage to decrease. Paul would support a free-market approach to health care, including tax deductions for medical expenses, and opposes federal regulations discouraging businesses from providing coverage. He supports Health Savings Accounts (HSAs). On Medicare, Paul has suggested higher deductibles as well as changes to premiums or eligibility rules as ways to address what he sees as the program's looming financial problems, saying "You want to have more participation by the person who's receiving the entitlement... by that I mean that they need to be more involved with some sort of economic transaction every time they use their entitlement, and that means they have to bear more of the burden." Paul also stated that he does not support such changes for current retirees or people nearing retirement.

He is in favor of repealing the Patient Protection and Affordable Care Act, commonly referred to as Obamacare. Following the Supreme Court decision which upheld the constitutionality of most of Obamacare, Paul released a statement saying, "Just because a couple people on the Supreme Court declare something to be 'constitutional' does not make it so. The whole thing remains unconstitutional."

=== Immigration ===
Paul supports immigration reform with a strong emphasis on border security, and has proposed adding patrols and physical barriers at the border as well as the use of drones, but does not advocate the deportation of undocumented immigrants, except for criminals. He supports granting legal status to undocumented immigrants in the form of temporary visas, but opposes a special path to citizenship for them. His previous proposals would allow immigrants holding temporary visas to eventually apply for permanent residency or citizenship.

Paul voted against the bipartisan immigration reform bill of 2013 after an amendment he proposed that would have established this procedure was rejected by the Senate.

In February 2019, Paul was one of sixteen senators to vote against legislation preventing a partial government shutdown and containing $1.4 billion for barriers along the U.S.-Mexico border that included 55 miles of fencing. In March 2019, Paul was one of 12 Republican senators to vote to block President Trump's national emergency declaration that would have granted him access to $3.6 billion in military construction funding to build border barriers.

=== Marijuana ===
Paul personally supports the legalization of medical marijuana. However, he believes it is a states' rights issue and that the federal government should not interfere. Paul was one of three U.S. senators in 2015 to introduce a bipartisan bill, CARERS, that would end the prohibition of medical marijuana under federal law.

Though Paul describes himself as a "social conservative," he was nonetheless described by the AP reporter as holding "libertarian leanings on drugs" as well as believing some drug sentences were too harsh. He announced plans to propose eliminating mandatory minimum sentences for marijuana possession in November 2012. Paul is a critic of the "war on drugs" and does not believe marijuana users should be put in jail. He supports the legalization of hemp for industrial purposes. Paul has also cosponsored the bipartisan STATES Act proposed in the 115th U.S. Congress by Massachusetts Senator Elizabeth Warren and Colorado Senator Cory Gardner that would exempt individuals or corporations in compliance with state cannabis laws from federal enforcement of the Controlled Substances Act.

=== Structure of government ===
Paul supports term limits, a balanced budget amendment, and the Read the Bills Act, in addition to the widespread reduction of federal spending and taxation.

==== Term limits ====
Although Paul supports a Constitutional amendment limiting Senators to two terms, he said, "I'm not in favor of term limits for some and not others. So I'm not in favor of people self-imposing term limits. I'm a co-sponsor of the constitutional amendment, but I will run again in 2022." Paul ran in the 2022 United States Senate election in Kentucky

==== Mandatory minimum sentencing ====
Paul has expressed doubt about the fairness of mandatory minimum sentencing guidelines, which require judges and prosecutors to impose substantial penalties, often including incarceration, on non-violent drug offenders. He believes that these laws are applied disproportionately to African Americans, arguing that non-violent drug offenses have contributed to a third of African American males being unable to vote.

=== Campaign finance reform ===
Paul opposes the Bipartisan Campaign Reform Act of 2002 and has called it a "dangerous piece of legislation". Instead, he supports regulating the contracts given out by Congress and placing limits on corporations receiving government contracts. He opposes legislation limiting the amount of money individuals, corporations, and organizations can give to candidates. Additionally, Paul has proposed "mandating a clause in all federal contracts over $1 million that requires the recipient to pledge not to lobby government or contribute to campaigns during the terms of the contract."

In December 2018, Paul defended President Trump against implications that he violated campaign finance laws during the 2016 election, saying, "I personally think if someone makes an error in filing paperwork or in not categorizing a campaign contribution correctly, it shouldn't be jail time, it ought to be a fine. It's just like a lot of other things we’ve done in Washington. We’ve over-criminalized campaign finance."

== Foreign policy ==
Paul holds that the primary Constitutional function of the federal government is national defense, and that the greatest national security threat is the lack of border security. He supports eliminating issuance of visas to people from "about ten rogue nations." He supports trying terrorists caught on the battlefield in military tribunals at Guantanamo Bay detention camp. Paul believes that when the U.S. goes to war, Congress must declare war as mandated by the Constitution.

According to the Huffington Post, unlike his more stridently "non-interventionist" father, Paul sees a role for American armed forces abroad, including in permanent foreign military bases. Beginning of 2013, Paul also spoke against U.S. overseas military bases. Paul supported the Trump's decision to pull the U.S. Army out of the Syrian Civil war via a tweet in December 2018.

Paul expressed "strong opposition" towards granting President Obama fast-track authority to negotiate the Trans-Pacific Partnership and called for Obama to finish the negotiations in just a few months.

Paul has criticized Hillary Clinton and Marco Rubio, calling them both neoconservatives. He argued that both Clinton and Rubio, supported U.S. military interventions in Libya, Syria and Iraq.

In 2016, Paul referred to John Bolton and Rudy Giuliani as "hawkish" and expressed opposition to either of them being appointed as secretary of state by President Trump.

=== War powers ===
In September 2017, the Senate voted 61 to 36 to table an amendment from Paul that would have removed the Authorizations for the Use of Military Force (AUMF) against the perpetrators of the September 11 attacks and for the Iraq War. The bill was the first time the full Senate held an AUMF vote since 2002, earning both bipartisan support and opposition. Paul said that voting against his resolution granted President Trump the right to do whatever he wanted.

=== Kurdistan ===
Paul opposed the Obama administration's "One Iraq" policy (which attempted to preserve Iraq as a union of Kurds, Sunnis and Shiites), and instead has advocated for Kurdish independence: "I would draw new lines for Kurdistan and I would promise them a country." Paul also advocated for an immediate change in the way American weapons had been delivered to the Kurdistan Regional Government: "The arms are going through Baghdad to get to the Kurds and they're being siphoned off and they're not getting what they need ... I think any arms coming from us or coming from any European countries ought to go directly to the Kurds."

=== Israel ===
Upon returning from a week-long trip to the Middle East, Paul asserted "it is none of our business whether Israel builds new neighborhoods in east Jerusalem or withdraws from the Golan Heights; the U.S. should not tell Israel how to defend itself."

In October 2023, Paul was the only senator not to cosponsor a resolution affirming American support for Israel.

In January 2024, Paul was the sole Republican to back legislation by Bernie Sanders requiring the State Department to report to Congress within 30 days on Israeli compliance with international and U.S. human rights laws.

After Donald Trump announced that America "will take over the Gaza strip," in February 2025, Paul took to Twitter (now X) to criticize the statement, saying "The pursuit for peace should be that of the Israelis and the Palestinians. I thought we voted for America First. We have no business contemplating yet another occupation to doom our treasure and spill our soldiers blood."

=== Afghanistan and Iraq ===
During his 2010 Senate campaign, Paul questioned the idea that U.S. Middle East policy is "killing more terrorists than it creates." He supported the war in Afghanistan and opposed rapid withdrawal from Iraq. He says he would have voted against the invasion of Iraq and questioned whether the intelligence was manipulated.

Paul reiterated that the U.S. needs to reassess who it is giving financial and military assistance to. He said the U.S. should begin cutting aid to countries who are burning the U.S. flag and chanting 'Death to America.' Paul raised concerns on continuing to give weapons and financial aid to Egypt, and said he was "very disappointed that after giving Egypt $60 billion in financial assistance over the past 30 years, Egyptian rioters climbed onto the roof of the U.S. Embassy, took down the U.S. flag and burned it. That should never have happened and is inexcusable."

In 2009, Paul put forth the theory that Dick Cheney exploited the September 11 attacks in order to push for war against Iraq so that Halliburton, Cheney's former company, would profit from it.

In 2020, Paul and Democratic senator Tom Udall offered an amendment to the National Defense Authorization Act that would withdraw American troops from Afghanistan within a year and raise their salaries. Paul said, "Our amendment will finally and completely end the war in Afghanistan. It is not sustainable to keep fighting in Afghanistan generation after generation."

=== Iran ===
In April 2015, Paul stated that he was in favor of continuing negotiations between the U.S. and Iran while remaining skeptical about nuclear framework between the two countries, adding that Iran would have to have demonstrated "proof of compliance and proof of goodwill" before sanctions could be removed.

In a July 2015 interview, President Obama spoke in favor of the Joint Comprehensive Plan of Action (JCPOA) and admitted few elected Republican officials would back the deal, adding, "It’ll be interesting to see what somebody like a Rand Paul has to say about this."

In July 2017, Paul voted against the Countering America's Adversaries Through Sanctions Act that placed sanctions on Russia together with Iran and North Korea. 98 senators voted for the act, Senator Bernie Sanders was the only other oppose.

In September 2017, during an interview, Paul said he believed Iran was complying with the terms of the JCPOA and advocated for the Trump administration to look to a deal targeting Iran's continuing ballistic missile program instead of removing the U.S. from the deal, furthering, "I think while the agreement’s not perfect, my main concern has always been compliance. But if they’re complying with it, I think we should stay in it.” In May 2018, after President Trump announced the U.S. withdrawal from the JCPOA, Paul said he believed it was "a mistake to leave" and added that it would negatively impact ongoing attempts to ease relations with North Korea by signaling the U.S. was not reliable.

Following Patrick M. Shanahan announcing 1,000 more U.S. troops being deployed to the Middle East for defensive purposes in June 2019, Paul was one of six senators to sign a letter spearheaded by Tim Kaine and Mike Lee expressing concern that "increasingly escalatory actions" by both the US and Iran would "lead to an unnecessary conflict." The senators noted that Congress had not authorized a war against Iran and requested "a joint Defense, State and Intelligence Community briefing by the end of June to address these policy and legal issues."

In June 2025, Paul criticized Trump's support for Israeli strikes against Iran and opposed the possible involvement of the United States in the war.

Sen. Rand Paul said that the Trump administration's reasons for wanting to go to war with Iran were not valid. He also believes that war should be used only when all other options have failed, not as the first choice.

Senator Paul mentioned that there was no discussion or vote by Congress before the US went to war with Iran, and he said this was against the Constitution. He said that the American people weren't told about the decision to go to war and weren't asked if they wanted to take on the responsibility of fighting in the war. He also mentioned that since there wasn't any national discussion before the war, answers to many important questions weren't clear. These questions included whether ground troops would be used, how long the war might last, who would lead Iran if the Supreme Leader was killed, and what the likely number of American casualties would be. He emphasized that the answers to these questions cannot be known because no one has bothered to make the case for the war being worthwhile. He ended by pointing out that the US Senate is discussing stopping the fighting after the war has already begun.

=== Russia ===
In August 2018, Paul delivered a letter from President Trump to Russian President Vladimir Putin that encouraged cooperation between the US and Russia on “countering terrorism, enhancing legislative dialogue and resuming cultural exchanges".

On May 12, 2022, Paul stopped a vote on a $40 billion spending bill for aid to Ukraine during the 2022 Russian invasion of Ukraine. Paul was listed among a number of American politicians, academics and activists who have promoted "Russian propaganda."

=== Reducing or eliminating foreign aid ===
Paul has called for reducing or eliminating foreign aid to all countries. In 2011, Paul had proposed budget cuts of $500 billion from the federal budget in part by cutting off foreign aid.

Paul stated that portra, "Rand Paul wants to end aid to Israel" are "not true, inappropriate and inflammatory," as they suggest he is somehow "targeting" the Jewish state. In 2018, Paul blocked a pair of bills which would authorize tens of billions of dollars of military aid to Israel, coming under fire from both Senate Republicans and Democrats.

Paul in March 2016 also criticized the move of the State Department to sell $700 million worth of F-16 Fighting Falcon fighter jets to Pakistan. He tried to block the sale with a vote in the Senate.

=== Saudi Arabia and Yemen ===
In March 2018, Paul voted against tabling a resolution spearheaded by Senators Bernie Sanders, Mike Lee, and Chris Murphy that would cease the U.S. military's support for Saudi Arabia's bombing operations in Yemen.

In April 2019, after the House passed the resolution withdrawing American support for the Saudi-led coalition in Yemen, Paul was one of nine lawmakers to sign a letter to President Trump requesting a meeting with him and urging him to sign "Senate Joint Resolution 7, which invokes the War Powers Act of 1973 to end unauthorized U.S. military participation in the Saudi-led coalition's armed conflict against Houthi rebels, initiated in 2015 by the Obama administration." They asserted the "Saudi-led coalition's imposition of an air-land-and-sea blockade as part of its war against the Houthis has continued to prevent the unimpeded distribution of these vital commodities, contributing to the suffering and death of vast numbers of civilians throughout the country" and that Trump's approval of the resolution through his signing would give a "powerful signal to the Saudi-led coalition to bring the four-year-old war to a close".

In June 2019, Paul was one of seven Republicans to vote to block President Trump's Saudi arms deal providing weapons to Saudi Arabia, UAE and Jordan, and was one of five Republicans to vote against an additional 20 arms sales.

==== Murder of journalist Jamal Khashoggi ====
In October 2018, Paul vowed to force a vote on American arm sales to Saudi Arabia after the disappearance of journalist Jamal Khashoggi, saying, "If they're responsible or even if there's any indication that they're implicated in killing this journalist that was critical of them, we've got to stop sending them arms." Paul was the only member of the Foreign Relations Committee to not sign a letter to President Trump requesting he initiate an investigation into the Khashoggi's death under the Magnitsky Act. Later that month, after Saudi Foreign Minister Adel Al-Jubeir criticized Paul's rhetoric on Khashoggi's killing, Paul told a reporter, "My direct response to the foreign minister would be that it takes a lot of damn gall for Saudi Arabia, a dictatorship with 3,000 political prisoners held without trial, to lecture anyone in the U.S. about the presumption of innocence." Paul was one of five Republican senators to sign a letter to President Trump calling on his administration to "suspend talks related to a potential civil nuclear cooperation agreement between the U.S. and Saudi Arabia" due to furthered "serious concerns about the transparency, accountability, and judgment of current decisionmakers in Saudi Arabia" following Khashoggi's death as well as actions by the Saudi government in Yemen and Lebanon.

In November 2018, speaking on the Khashoggi's murder, Paul said, "I think the evidence is overwhelming that the crown prince was involved. I don't think we can sweep this under the rug." Paul stated his disbelief in the effectiveness of sanctions on Saudi Arabia, given the imprisonment of Saudi officials that had been arrested for their role in the killing and called for the U.S. to move toward punishing "who ordered this, who's in charge". Paul added that the only thing understood by the Saudis was "strength", citing this as the reason that if President Trump "wants to act strongly, he should cut off the arm sales."

=== State Department ===
In September 2018, Paul was one of five senators to sign a letter to Secretary of State Mike Pompeo urging him to employ more multi-factor authentication in order to secure the information systems of the State Department and seeking answers on how the department would boost its security following the Office of Management and Budget designating the department's cyber readiness as "high risk" as well as what the department would do to address the lack of multi-factor authentication required by law and for statistics that detail the department's cyber incidents over the last three years.

=== NATO ===
In July 2018, along with Mike Lee, Paul was one of two senators to vote against a motion expressing support from the Senate for NATO and requesting that negotiators reaffirm American commitment to NATO.

=== North Korea ===
During a Louisville visit in April 2017, Paul stated his belief that although the U.S. would be "successful in a military campaign" against North Korea, no one wanted a war if it meant "millions of people would die". Paul added that it would "be nice if North Korea understood that launching a nuclear weapon at us would be catastrophic. It would be the end of North Korea."

In June 2018, after Senator Lindsey Graham suggested that Congress sign a military force authorization for the U.S. to take action against North Korea in the event that a diplomatic agreement was not reached during the North Korea–United States Singapore Summit, Paul called Graham "a danger to the country by even proposing ideas like authorizing war with Korea" and that his proposal "should be something that is seen as naive and seen as something that really serious people shouldn’t even really be discussing."
