= Healthcare rationing in the United States =

Healthcare rationing in the United States exists in various forms. Access to private health insurance is rationed on price and ability to pay. Those unable to afford a health insurance policy are unable to acquire a private plan except by employer-provided and other job-attached coverage, and insurance companies sometimes pre-screen applicants for pre-existing medical conditions. Applicants with such conditions may be declined cover or pay higher premiums and/or have extra conditions imposed such as a waiting period.

The poor are given access to Medicaid, which is restricted by income and asset limits by means-testing, and other federal and state eligibility regulations apply. Health maintenance organizations (HMOs), which are common among the rest of the population, restrict access to treatment by financial and clinical access limits. Those 65 and older and a few others also qualify for Medicare, but it also has many restrictions.

In the media and in academia, some have advocated explicit healthcare rationing to limit the cost of Medicare and Medicaid. They argue that a proper rationing mechanism would be more equitable and cost-effective.

The Congressional Budget Office (CBO) has argued that health care costs are the primary driver of government spending in the long term.

== Background ==
Peter Singer wrote for the New York Times Magazine in July 2009 that healthcare is rationed in the United States:

Health care is a scarce resource, and all scarce resources are rationed in one way or another. In the United States, most health care is privately financed, and so most rationing is by price: you get what you, or your employer, can afford to insure you for. But our current system of employer-financed health insurance exists only because the federal government encouraged it by making the premiums tax deductible. That is, in effect, a more than $200 billion government subsidy for health care. In the public sector, primarily Medicare, Medicaid and hospital emergency rooms, health care is rationed by long waits, high patient copayment requirements, low payments to doctors that discourage some from serving public patients and limits on payments to hospitals.

David Leonhardt wrote in the New York Times in June 2009 that rationing presently an economic reality: "The choice isn't between rationing and not rationing. It's between rationing well and rationing badly. Given that the United States devotes far more of its economy to health care than other rich countries, and gets worse results by many measures, it's hard to argue that we are now rationing very rationally." He wrote that there are three primary ways the US rations healthcare:

1. The increases in healthcare premiums reduce worker pay. In other words, more expensive insurance premiums reduce the growth in household income, which forces tradeoffs between healthcare services and other consumption.
2. The increases also prevent smaller companies from affording health insurance for their workers.
3. The cost prevents the certain types of care from being provided.

During 2007, nearly 45% of US healthcare expenses were paid for by the government. In 2009, an estimated 46 million individuals in the United States did not have health insurance coverage. In 2008, Tia Powell led a New York State work group to set up guidelines for rationing ventilators during a potential flu pandemic.

== Methods used ==
=== By insurance companies ===
Dr. Gerald Grumet has chronicled how private insurers and third party payers delay and impede the utilization of medical services through creating inconvenience and confusion for both patients and physicians through complex claims review processes with layers of administrative handling that supersede the autonomy of treating physicians.

President Obama noted that US healthcare was rationed based on income, type of employment, and pre-existing medical conditions, with nearly 46 million uninsured. He stated that millions of Americans were denied coverage or face higher premiums because of pre-existing medical conditions.

In an e-mail to Obama supporters, David Axelrod wrote, "Reform will stop 'rationing' - not increase it.... It's a myth that reform will mean a 'government takeover' of health care or lead to 'rationing.' To the contrary, reform will forbid many forms of rationing that are currently being used by insurance companies."

A 2008 study by researchers at the Urban Institute found that health spending for uninsured non-elderly Americans was only about 43% of health spending for similar, privately insured Americans. That implied rationing by price and ability to pay.

Fareed Zakaria wrote that only 38% of small businesses provided health insurance for their employees during 2009, versus 61% in 1993, because of rising costs.

An investigation by the House Subcommittee on Oversight and Investigations showed that health insurers WellPoint Inc., UnitedHealth Group, and Assurant Inc. canceled the coverage of more than 20,000 people, allowing the companies to avoid paying more than $300 million in medical claims over five years. It also found that policyholders with breast cancer, lymphoma, and more than 1000 other conditions were targeted for rescission and that employees were praised in performance reviews for terminating the policies of customers with expensive illnesses.

Private and public insurers all have their own drug formularies through which they set coverage limitations, which may include referrals to the insurance company for a decision on whether the company will approve its share of the costs. American formularies make generalized coverage decisions by class, with cheaper drugs at one end of the scale and more expensive drugs with more conditions for referral and possible denial at the other end. Not all drugs may be in the formulary of every company, and consumers are advised to check the formulary before they buy insurance.

The phenomena known as medical bankruptcy is unheard of in countries with universal health care in which medical copayments are low or no nonexistent. In the United States, however, research shows that many bankruptcies have a strong medical component, even among the insured. Medical insurance before the Affordable Care Act allowed annual caps or lifetime caps on coverage, and the high cost of care made it common for insured persons to suffer bankruptcy after breaching those limits.

=== By price ===
A July 2009 NPR article quoted various doctors describing how America rations healthcare. Dr. Arthur Kellermann said: "In America, we strictly ration health care. We've done it for years.... But in contrast to other wealthy countries, we don't ration medical care on the basis of need or anticipated benefit. In this country, we mainly ration on the ability to pay. And that is especially evident when you examine the plight of the uninsured in the United States."

Rationing by price means accepting that there is no triage according to need. Thus, in the private sector, it is accepted that some people get expensive surgeries such as liver transplants or non-life-threatening ones such as cosmetic surgery, when others fail to get cheaper and much more cost-effective care such as prenatal care, which could save the lives of many fetuses and newborn children. Some places, like Oregon for example, explicitly ration Medicaid resources by using medical priorities.

Polling has discovered that Americans are much more likely than Europeans or Canadians to forgo necessary health care (such not seeking a prescribed medicine) on the grounds of cost.

According to a recent survey commissioned by Wolters Kluwer, the majority of physicians and nurses (79%) say the cost to the patient influences the treatment choices or recommendations the provider makes.

=== Rationing by pharmaceutical companies ===
Pharmaceutical manufacturers often charge much more for drugs in the United States than they charge for the same drugs in Britain, where they know that a higher price would put the drug outside the cost-effectiveness limits applied by regulators such as NICE. American patients, even if they are covered by Medicare or Medicaid, often cannot afford the copayments for drugs, which is rationing based on ability to pay.

=== Rationing by government control ===
After the death of Coby Howard in 1987 Oregon began a programme of public consultation to decide which procedures its Medicaid program should cover in an attempt to develop a transparent process for prioritizing medical services. Howard died of leukaemia, which was not funded. His mother spent the last weeks of his life trying to raise $100,000 to pay for a bone marrow transplant, but the boy died before treatment could begin. John Kitzhaber began a campaign arguing that thousands of low-income Oregonians lacked access to even basic health services, much less access to transplants. A panel of experts was appointed, the Health Services Commission, to develop a prioritized list of treatments. The state legislators decided where on the list of prioritised procedures the line of eligibility should be drawn. In 1995 there were 745 procedures, 581 of which were eligible for funding.

Republican Newt Gingrich argued that the reform plans supported by President Obama expand the control of government over healthcare decisions, which he referred to as a type of healthcare rationing. He expressed concern that although there is nothing in the proposed laws that would constitute rationing, the combination of three factors would increase pressure on the government to ration care explicitly for the elderly: an expanded federal bureaucracy, the pending insolvency of Medicare within a decade, and the fact that 25% of Medicare costs are incurred in the final year of life.

Princeton Professor Uwe Reinhardt wrote that both public and private healthcare programs can ration and rebutted the concept that governments alone impose rationing: "Many critics of the current health reform efforts would have us believe that only governments ration things.... On the other hand, these same people believe that when, for similar reasons, a private health insurer refuses to pay for a particular procedure or has a price-tiered formulary for drugs – e.g., asking the insured to pay a 35 percent coinsurance rate on highly expensive biologic specialty drugs that effectively put that drug out of the patient's reach — the insurer is not rationing health care. Instead, the insurer is merely allowing "consumers" (formerly "patients") to use their discretion on how to use their own money. The insurers are said to be managing prudently and efficiently, forcing patients to trade off the benefits of health care against their other budget priorities."

During 2009, former Alaska Governor Sarah Palin wrote against rationing by government entities, referring to what she interpreted as such an entity in current reform legislation as a "death panel" and "downright evil." Defenders of the plan indicated that the proposed legislation, H.R. 3200, would allow Medicare for the first time to cover patient-doctor consultations about end-of-life planning, including discussions about drawing up a living will or planning hospice treatment. Patients would be allowed but not required to seek out such advice on their own. The provision would limit Medicare coverage to one consultation every five years. However, as governor, Palin had supported such end of life counseling and advance directives from patients in Alaska in 2008.

Ezra Klein described in the Washington Post how polls indicate senior citizens are increasingly resistant to healthcare reform because of concerns about cuts to the existing Medicare program that may be required to fund it. That is creating an unusual and potent political alliance, with Republicans arguing to protect the existing Medicare program although they historically opposed that and other major entitlement programs. The CBO scoring of the proposed H.R. 3200 (America's Affordable Health Choices Act of 2009) included $219 billion in savings over 10 years, some of which would come from Medicare changes.

=== By economic value added ===
A concept called "quality-adjusted life year" (QALY - pronounced "qualy") is used by Australian Medicare to measure the cost-benefit of applying a particular medical procedure. It reflects the quality and the quantity of life added by incurring a particular medical expense. The measure has been used for over 30 years in the country's universal single-payer healthcare system and has been implemented in several other countries to help with rationing decisions. Australia applies QALY measures to control costs and ration care and allows private supplemental insurance for those who can afford it.

=== By comparative effectiveness research ===
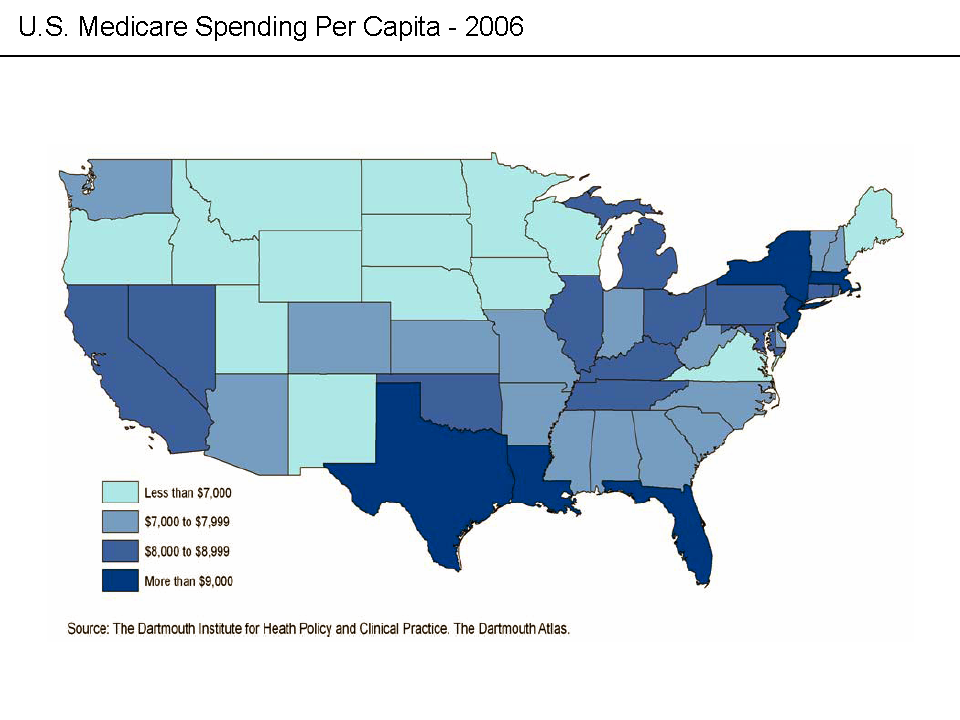
Medicare spending per person varied significantly across states in 2006.

Several treatment alternatives may be available for a given medical condition, with significantly different costs but no statistical difference in outcome. Such scenarios offer the opportunity to maintain or improve the quality of care while significantly reducing costs through comparative effectiveness research. Writing in the New York Times, David Leonhardt described how the cost of treating the most common form of early-stage, slow-growing prostate cancer ranges from an average of $2,400 (watchful waiting to see if the condition deteriorates) to as high as $100,000 (radiation beam therapy):

Some doctors swear by one treatment, others by another. But no one really knows which is best. Rigorous research has been scant. Above all, no serious study has found that the high-technology treatments do better at keeping men healthy and alive. Most die of something else before prostate cancer becomes a problem.

According to economist Peter A. Diamond and research cited by the Congressional Budget Office (CBO), the cost of healthcare per person in the US also varies significantly by geography and medical center, with little or no statistical difference in outcome:

Although the Mayo Clinic scores above the other two [in terms of quality of outcome], its cost per beneficiary for Medicare clients in the last six months of life ($26,330) is nearly half that at the UCLA Medical Center ($50,522) and significantly lower than the cost at Massachusetts General Hospital ($40,181)...The American taxpayer is financing these large differences in costs, but we have little evidence of what benefit we receive in exchange.

Comparative effectiveness research has shown that significant cost reductions are possible. Office of Management and Budget (OMB) Director Peter Orszag stated: "Nearly thirty percent of Medicare's costs could be saved without negatively affecting health outcomes if spending in high- and medium-cost areas could be reduced to the level of low-cost areas."

President Obama has provided more than $1 billion in the 2009 stimulus package to jumpstart Comparative Effectiveness Research (CER) and to finance a federal CER advisory council to implement that idea. Economist Martin Feldstein wrote in the Wall Street Journal, "Comparative effectiveness could become the vehicle for deciding whether each method of treatment provides enough of an improvement in health care to justify its cost."

=== By government ===
Former Republican Secretary of Commerce Peter George Peterson indicated that some form of rationing is inevitable and desirable considering the state of US finances and the trillions of dollars of unfunded Medicare liabilities. He estimated that 25 to 33% of healthcare services are provided to those in the last months or year of life and advocated restrictions if quality of life cannot be improved. He also recommended for a budget to be established for government healthcare expenses by establishing spending caps and pay-as-you-go rules that require tax increases for any incremental spending. He has indicated that a combination of tax increases and spending cuts will be required. He advocated addressing those issues under the aegis of a fiscal reform commission.

Arizona modified its Medicaid coverage rules because of a budget problem that included denying care for expensive treatments such as organ transplants to Medicaid recipients, including those who had previously been promised funding. MSNBC's Keith Olbermann and others have dubbed Governor Jan Brewer and the state legislatures as a real life death panel because many of those poor people who are now being denied funding will die or have health because of the political decision.

==== At the state level ====
The Oregon Health Plan was a state-level Medicaid program that had gained international attention in the health care community for, as published in the Canadian Medical Association Journal, it being having been perceived to be "first public insurance program to ration medical care explicitly". However, the plan was more a managed care plan like those found in a U.S. health management organization (HMO) where medical fees are coordinated on a prepaid basis.

=== By age ===
In the US, the discussion on rationing healthcare for the elderly began to be noticed widely in 1983 when economist Alan Greenspan asked "whether it is worth it" in referring to the use of 30% of the Medicare budget on 5–6% of those eligible who then die within a year of receiving treatment. In 1984, the Democratic governor of Colorado, Richard Lamm, was widely quoted but claimed to have been misquoted as saying that the elderly "have a duty to die and get out of the way."

Medical ethicist Daniel Callahan's 1987 Setting Limits: Medical Goals in an Aging Society discusses whether healthcare should be rationed by age. He calls the elderly "a new social threat" and selfish and for age to be used as a criterion in limiting healthcare. Callahan's book has been widely discussed in the America media, including the New York Times, the Washington Post, the Wall Street Journal, and "just about every relevant professional and scholarly journal and newsletter." One of the major arguments against such age-based rationing is the fact that chronological age, by itself, is a poor indicator of health. Another major argument against Callahan's proposal is that it inverts the Western tradition by making death a possible good and life a possible evil. Amherst College Jurisprudence Professor Robert Laurence Barry called Callahan's view "medical totalitarianism." One book-length rebuttal to Callahan from half-a-dozen professors who held a conference at the University of Illinois College of Law in October 1989 was in 1991's Set No Limits: a Rebuttal to Daniel Callahan's Proposal to Limit Health, edited by Robert Laurence Barry and Gerard V. Bradley, a visiting professor of religious studies at the University of Illinois at Urbana–Champaign.

== Arguments in favor ==
Australian philosopher Peter Singer argued for rationing processes:

"Rationing health care means getting value for the billions we are spending by setting limits on which treatments should be paid for from the public purse. If we ration we won't be writing blank checks to pharmaceutical companies for their patented drugs, nor paying for whatever procedures doctors choose to recommend. When public funds subsidize health care or provide it directly, it is crazy not to try to get value for money. The debate over health care reform in the United States should start from the premise that some form of health care rationing is both inescapable and desirable. Then we can ask, What is the best way to do it?"

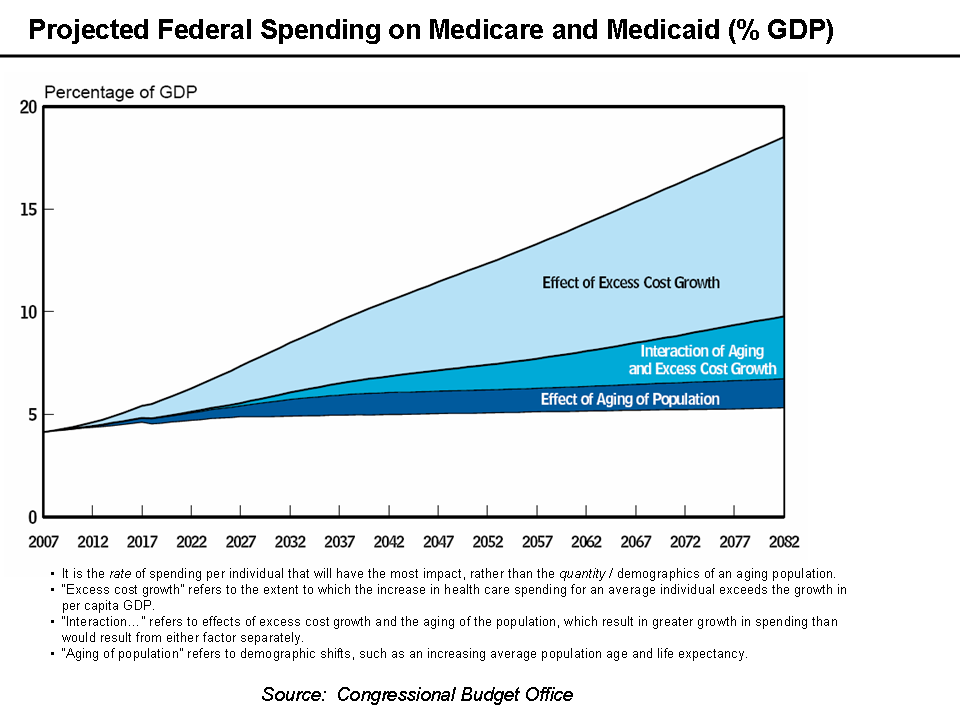
Medicare and Medicaid Spending as a percentage of GDP

The Congressional Budget Office reported in June 2008:

"Future growth in spending per beneficiary for Medicare and Medicaid—the federal government's major health care programs—will be the most important determinant of long-term trends in federal spending. Changing those programs in ways that reduce the growth of costs—which will be difficult, in part because of the complexity of health policy choices—is ultimately the nation's central long-term challenge in setting federal fiscal policy... total federal Medicare and Medicaid outlays will rise from 4 percent of GDP in 2007 to 12 percent in 2050 and 19 percent in 2082—which, as a share of the economy, is roughly equivalent to the total amount that the federal government spends today. The bulk of that projected increase in health care spending reflects higher costs per beneficiary rather than an increase in the number of beneficiaries associated with an aging population."

In other words, all other federal spending categories (such as Social Security, defense, education, and transportation) would require borrowing to be funded, which is not feasible.

President Obama stated in May 2009, "But we know that our families, our economy, and our nation itself will not succeed in the 21st century if we continue to be held down by the weight of rapidly rising health care costs and a broken health care system.... Our businesses will not be able to compete; our families will not be able to save or spend; our budgets will remain unsustainable unless we get health care costs under control."

Healthcare rationing remained a political topic into 2017, with Bernie Sanders and Ted Cruz debating on CNN whether a single-payer system would lead to healthcare rationing.

== See also ==
- Healthcare reform in the United States
- Healthcare reform debate in the United States
- Public opinion on health care reform in the United States
- Health care in the United States
- Death panel
