= America's Affordable Health Choices Act of 2009 =

Proposed U.S. law

The proposed America's Affordable Health Choices Act of 2009 (H.R. 3200) was an unsuccessful bill introduced in the U.S. House of Representatives on July 14, 2009. The bill was introduced during the first session of the 111th Congress as part of an effort of the Democratic Party leadership to enact health care reform. The bill was not approved by the House, but was superseded by a similar bill, the proposed Affordable Health Care for America Act (HR 3962), which was passed by the House in November 2009, by a margin of 220-215 votes but later abandoned.

A similar bill to HR 3200, called the "Affordable Health Choices Act" (HR 1679), was introduced in the Senate on September 17, 2009. It too was unsuccessful as the Senate approved instead another proposal called the "Patient Protection and Affordable Care Act".

According to the Congressional Budget Office, HR 3200 included tax increases and spending cuts that reduce the net increase in the federal deficit to 1% of 2008 tax revenues. The CBO director subsequently noted that, in terms of total National Health Expenditure, non-governmental spending will increase as coverage expands.

The bill was originally sponsored by Representatives John Dingell, Charles Rangel, Henry Waxman, George Miller, Pete Stark, Frank Pallone, and Robert Andrews. The 1017 page PDF version of the bill is the first of three health care reform-related legislative proposals expected from the Democratic congressional leadership. Votes in the U.S. House of Representatives on this bill and on the Medicare for All Act, an alternative that would establish a national, universal single-payer health insurance, were previously expected in September 2009 and again in October 2009, before the actual November 2009 vote took place.

== Elements of the bill ==
The summary of the bill includes the following elements, among others:

1. Establishes a mandate to purchase private insurance for most individuals with an income above poverty level.
2. Creates a mechanism to enforce the mandate in a sliding scale tax on those who do not purchase health insurance for most legal United States residents with an income above poverty level.
3. Prohibits pre-existing condition exclusions.
4. Requires adjusted community rating, guaranteed issue, and guaranteed renewal of individual and small group health insurance that: limits age rating variation of premiums to 2:1 (200 percent), prohibits gender and health status rating variation of premiums, allows variation of premiums by geographic area and family (vs. individual) enrollment.
5. Prohibits cancellation of coverage except for evidence of fraud.
6. Limits annual out-of-pocket expenses to $5,000 for an individual and $10,000 for a family.
7. Requires Health and Human Services to create a non-subsidized public health insurance plan with pricing based on private industry averages. Three optional levels of coverage are to be offered by the plan which must set premiums at a level sufficient to fully finance the costs of the health benefits the administrative costs related to operating the plan.
8. Establishes a Health Insurance Exchange (HIE) within a proposed Health Choices Administration, to provide a market place for insurers to sell qualifying plans on a public web site.
9. Requires the creation of a risk equalization pool that will allow qualifying plans to minimize the impact of adverse selection of enrollees among the plans.
10. Provides a tax credit for low-income individuals and families to help pay insurance premiums.
11. Requires employers with payroll costs over $500,000 to provide health insurance that meets the minimum standard of coverage allowed in the HIE.
12. Provides for a tax on employers that do not provide the required health insurance.
13. Provides for a tax on couples with adjusted joint gross income exceeding $350,000 (80% of this figure for single people)
14. Reduces Medicare payments to hospitals with excessive re-admissions.
15. Further expands Medicaid eligibility and scope of covered preventive services, for lower-income individuals and families.
16. Increases Medicaid payments to physicians for primary care.
17. Provides for a phased-in elimination of the Medicare Part D coverage gap and requires drug manufactures to discount and/or rebate additional qualifying drugs originally excluded from the plan.
18. Requires the Secretary of Health and Human Services (HHS) to develop quality measures for the delivery of health care services in the United States.
19. Establishes the Health Benefits Advisory Committee chaired by the Surgeon General of the United States.
20. Prioritizes any eventual implementation of best practices in the delivery of health care.
21. Establishes a National Prevention and Wellness Strategy along with appropriations for its trust fund.
22. Outlines Administrative standards that reduces costs and improves service, including the ability for Administrators to determine an accurate total financial estimate at the point of service as well as enabling real time electronic transfer of funds to take place if possible (mirrors currently existing laws).

=== House Committees' mark-ups ===
America's Affordable Health Choices Act of 2009 has been amended in the nature of substitute during mark-up proceedings since its original introduction recorded in the Congressional Record on July 14, 2009. These amendments have only been voted on by each Committee involved in order to pass out of the Committee phase but have not been voted on by the full House membership, which is needed before the originally introduced legislation can be changed to reflect any amendments recommended by the Committees and passed by a full House vote.

==== House Committee on Energy and Commerce ====
- See external link to Mark-Up Summary

==== House Committee on Ways and Means ====
- See external link to Mark-Up Summary

==== House Committee on Education and Labor ====
- Kucinich Amendment

The Kucinich Amendment to Health Care Bill HR 3200 grants states rights to single payer health care at the state level. This is how Canada adopted single payer, with Saskatchewan passing it first. In July 2009, the House Education and Labor Committee approved the Kucinich Amendment by a vote of 27–19, with 14 Democrats and 13 Republicans voting for it.

- See external link to Mark-Up Summary

=== Comparison with Senate versions ===
The Washington Post published comparison tables of the main House version with the two main Senate versions, which themselves may be summarized as:

| 3 Versions | House | Senate Health | Senate Finished | Notes |
|---|---|---|---|---|
| Deficit increase(+)/ reduction(-) to 2019 ($B) | -104 | +597 | -81 | Senate Health Committee has no jurisdiction to modify taxes |
| Cost($B) | 1279 | 645 | 845 | |
| Number of uninsured | 17M | 34M | 25M | 54M uninsured by 2019 without bill |
| Public option | Yes | Yes | No | |
| Individual mandate | Yes | Yes | Yes | (see Insurance subsidies) |
| Employer mandate | Yes | Yes | Yes | |
| New taxes($k) | fam>350 | No* | plan>21 | *outside Senate Health Committee jurisdiction |
| Insurance reforms | Yes | Yes | Yes | |
| Expand Medicaid | Yes | No* | Yes | *outside Senate Health Committee jurisdiction |
| Insurance subsidies | Yes | Yes | Yes | prorated to $88k/family of 4, or tax creds(S.Fin) |

== CBO analysis of the bill ==
The U.S. Congressional Budget Office is a non-partisan organization that analyzes the effect on the federal budget of proposed and existing legislation on behalf of the Congress. CBO analyzed the bill as of July 14, 2009 and reported the following:

According to CBO's and JCT's assessment, enacting H.R. 3200 would result in a net increase in the federal budget deficit of $239 billion over the 2010–2019 period. That estimate reflects a projected 10-year cost of the bill's insurance coverage provisions of $1,042 billion, partly offset by net spending changes that CBO estimates would save $219 billion over the same period, and by revenue provisions that JCT estimates would increase federal revenues by about $583 billion over those 10 years.

In terms of what would happen for consumers, the CBO's methodology in a report in late July used a public plan with premiums about 10% lower than private plans.

== Health exchange details ==
Businesses with ten or fewer employees can use the exchange in the first year after the act begins. The cutoff changes to twenty or fewer employees the next year. On the third year, the 'Health Choices Commissioner' has the authority to phase in businesses with more employees. The legislation does not specify any further phases, leaving that up to the officer to decide.

The act creates new standards, intended by lawmakers as methods of consumer protection, for what would be considered a minimally acceptable insurance plan. Employers that currently offer insurance have a five-year grace period after the act begins before they would be subject to the standards. Individuals would be free to purchase their own private insurance, or work with the public option, in this period and afterward.

== Health Benefits Advisory Committee ==
According to Division A, Title I, Subtitle C, Section 123 of HR 3200, a Health Benefits Advisory Committee shall be established to be chaired by the Surgeon General of the United States. It will consist of 9 more individuals who are not federal employees that are appointed by the President of the United States. It will also consist of 9 members who are appointed by the Comptroller General of the United States. Also, up to eight more members will be appointed in even numbers by the President of the United States who are federal employees and officers. Each member of the committee will serve three year terms. The Health Benefits Advisory Committee will recommend to the United States Secretary of Health and Human Services benefit standards and periodic updates to such standards.

== Debate and controversies ==
=== Reimbursement for counseling about living wills ===
One often-cited provision of the un-passed bill would have authorized Medicare reimbursement for physicians who provide voluntary counseling about such subjects as living wills. The provision is based on a separate bill that was cosponsored by Republican Charles Boustany of Louisiana, a surgeon, and is similar to end-of-life counseling signed by President George W. Bush. This Advance Care Planning Consultation section was criticized by some Republicans and conservatives such as Betsy McCaughey, a lobbyist for the healthcare industry who also helped to defeat the Clinton health care plan of 1993. These critics allege that it includes mandatory language aimed at pressing elderly and disabled patients toward euthanasia. Their interpretation was the basis for the charge about this section by prominent Republican 2008 Vice Presidential candidate Sarah Palin.

My parents or my baby with Down Syndrome will have to stand in front of Obama's "death panel" so his bureaucrats can decide, based on a subjective judgment of their level of productivity in society, whether they are worthy of health care.

— Sarah Palin

However, the "level of productivity in society" or panels claim is not mentioned in the actual legislation, which is structured primarily to amend a specific clause in the Social Security Act, Section 1861 of definitions that are used in sections regarding reimbursements for end-of-life counseling, including the use of Advance Directives. Charles Boustany's Democratic cosponsor, Earl Blumenauer of Oregon, has called this attack on the bill "an all-time low".

Blumenauer said the measure would block funds for counseling that presents suicide or assisted suicide as an option, and called references to death panels or euthanasia "mind-numbing". He said that "the majority of Congressional Republicans supported the similar provisions for terminally ill elderly patients that were part of the 2003 prescription drug bill" and that, out of the dozens of Republican proposals for revising the bill, "not a single word" was said against end-of-life counseling. He said that Rush Limbaugh, Virginia Foxx, Newt Gingrich, Charles Grassley and other Republicans defended the death panel story only after Betsy McCaughey's editorials, and that some people at town hall meetings even wanted to "keep government out of their Medicare," a government run program. Blumenauer said that as recently as April 2008 then-governor Palin supported end-of-life counseling as part of Health Care Decisions Day. Palin's office called this comparison "hysterically funny" and "desperate". Republican Senator Johnny Isakson, who co-sponsored a 2007 end-of-life counseling provision, called the euthanasia claim "nuts". Analysts who examined the end-of-life provision Palin cited agreed that it merely authorized Medicare reimbursement for physicians who provide voluntary counseling for advance health care directives (including living wills). According to TIME and ABC, Palin and McCaughey made false euthanasia claims.

The page 425 legislation began as a separate bill that was co-sponsored by Republicans Charles Boustany, Patrick Tiberi and Geoff Davis. Boustany, a heart surgeon, said the end-of-life legislation was a "good medical practice". 204 GOP House members and 42 GOP Senators voted for a 2003 Medicare prescription drug bill that included end-of-life counseling. The 2003 legislation only covered end-of-life counseling for terminally ill patients, which the Republican Charles Grassley supported. Grassley said that the 2009 end-of-life counseling would "pull the plug on grandma" and that "You shouldn't have counseling at the end of life, you should have done that 20 years before," which is what the 2009 legislation would allow. Republican Newt Gingrich defended the death panel claim, but previously praised the Gundersen Lutheran Health System for encouraging the widespread use of Advance Directives.

The federal requirement that hospitals help patients with things like living wills began when Republican George H. W. Bush was president. Section 1233 merely allows doctors to be paid for their time. However, between 30 percent and 45 percent of Americans believed in the death panel story. According to PolitiFact, private health insurance companies already ration health care by income, by denying health insurance to those with pre-existing conditions and by caps on health insurance payments. Rationing exists now, and will continue to exist with or without health care reform.

The "death panel" argument was endorsed by an erroneous editorial in the Investor's Business Daily, which analogized the bill to the National Health Service (NHS) in the United Kingdom and editorialized: "People such as scientist Stephen Hawking wouldn't have a chance in the U.K., where the National Health Service would say the life of this brilliant man, because of his physical handicaps, is essentially worthless." The Investor's Business Daily editorialists had to beat a retreat and quickly retracted its claim after it was pointed out that Hawking was in fact British, and had lived his entire life in the United Kingdom with treatment from the NHS. Stephen Hawking responded, "I wouldn't be here today if it were not for the NHS. I have received a large amount of high-quality treatment without which I would not have survived."

On a separate issue, physician and conservative commentator Charles Krauthammer has criticized what he sees as a naive focus on living wills by the policymakers over other types of medical advice. He has written:

When my father was dying, my mother and brother and I had to decide how much treatment to pursue. What was a better way to ascertain my father's wishes: What he checked off on a form... or what we, who had known him intimately for decades, thought he would want?

=== Competition ===
A CNN report has stated that the proposed public option is a 'lightning rod' in American public opinion about healthcare reform. Republicans, people with the insurance industry, and employer groups have discussed the concern that the availability of a public plan would make it difficult for private insurers to compete. This may then lead to a situation where most people end up being covered by the public insurance option.

The Congressional Budget Office's analysis in late July stated that this would not be the case for the "public option" included in H.R. 3200, projecting that only about 11 to 12 million people would enroll in the public option. The Lewin Group, a research firm that is part of a subsidiary of UnitedHealth Group but is run independently, has estimated that over 100 million people would join the public plan if it were structured like Medicare, which would then make it the dominant insurer.

A model similar to one proposed by the late Senator Ted Kennedy would bring in between 21.5 million and 67.5 million according to the group. A 2008 report by the Urban Institute stated the public option would probably settle into a 'niche' in the insurance market with other firms still able to compete.

The bill bases the publicly authorized insurance plan fees on industry averages, so there is no clear economic competitive advantage versus existing private insurance. The health insurance subsidy is available to anyone with a qualifying level of income buying insurance from the exchange regardless of whether they choose a public or private plan. A poll done by Penn, Schoen and Berland Associates for the AARP stated that only 37% of Americans correctly identified the definition of the 'public option' being proposed, numbers very close to respondents guessing randomly among answers.

In a June 2009 NBC News/The Wall Street Journal survey, 76% said it was either "extremely" or "quite" important to "give people a choice of both a public plan administered by the federal government and a private plan for their health insurance." A July survey by Rasmussen Reports found 50% of Americans opposed the idea of a public option and 35% expressed support. An August 2009 NBC News/Wall Street Journal poll found 47% of Americans opposed and 43% expressing support. CNN Polling Director Keating Holland has stated that partisan affiliations drive people's opinions on the issue.

=== Town halls ===
A number of town hall meetings held by members of Congress during the August 2009 congressional recess were the site of protests and disruptions by opponents of this health care reform legislation. Steven Pearlstein of The Washington Post wrote that the concerns raised in most of these town hall disruptions are factually incorrect claims made by some conservative members of Congress and some in the right-wing media in opposition of the reform bill. Wendell Potter, who has been an executive of Cigna, a for-profit health insurer, stated that health insurance companies "are very much behind the town hall disruptions that you see and a lot of the deception that's going on in terms of disinformation that many Americans, apparently, are believing."

Many proponents of the reform bill have accused organizations such as FreedomWorks, a corporate and individual funded activist group, of organizing these protests to look like grassroots opposition. FreedomWorks representatives have stated that they represent grassroots dissatisfaction and disputed the allegations. The chairman of FreedomWorks is former Republican House Majority Leader and healthcare lobbyist Dick Armey. Health Care for America Now (HCAN), a union and individual-funded liberal activist group, organized and co-ordinated health care reform proponents in the town hall meetings. FreedomWorks has accused them of astroturfing, which HCAN disputes. The Service Employees International Union (SEIU), a labor union, has been accused by opponents of the reform bill of busing paid operatives into town halls to demonstrate in support of the measure. The group denies the accusation.

Rasmussen Reports found in a late-August survey that a 49% plurality of Americans believe that protesters genuinely express their own views while 37% consider them to be a creation of special interest groups and lobbyists. An early-August survey stated that 35% viewed the protests unfavorably and 41% viewed them favorably. Both polls showed highly partisan differences in people's view of the town halls.

=== Medicare issues ===
Ezra Klein has written in The Washington Post'' in late August that, in his opinion, polls now indicate that senior citizens are becoming fearful of healthcare reform, due to concerns that funding subsidies for the uninsured would require cuts to the popular Medicare program. He said that the specific changes "don't involve anything of the kind (most of the savings would come from reducing overpayments to the private insurers that participate in the Medicare Advantage program)". He argued that, as a result, an odd but potent political alliance has emerged with Republicans arguing to protect the existing Medicare program despite its position historically which has been to oppose Medicare as an entitlement.

Peter R. Orszag, the then director of the CBO, argued in June 2008 that the Medicare program as currently structured is unsustainable without significant reform, as tax revenues dedicated to the program are not sufficient to cover its rapidly increasing expenditures. According to the CBO, spending on Medicare will grow from $485 billion during 2009 to $879 billion by 2018. President Obama said at a White House news conference on July 22 that, without changes, the system is guaranteed "to basically break the federal budget". He argued that it is necessary to cut wasteful spending which is known to exist (over-testing, no IT, lack of co-ordination, hospital re-admissions) in order to cut costs in order to protect Medicare in the future and cut the projected national deficit.

The act, as currently structured, does not cut present Medicare benefits. It reduces projected future increases in Medicare spending such as inpatient hospital service payments and ambulatory care payments that would otherwise undergo annual re-adjustments. These changes would save $196 billion from Medicare over 10 years and removing wasteful subsidies to insurers for Medicare Advantage plan would save a further $156 billion according to the CBO. Gail Wilensky, a deputy assistant to President Bush Snr advising him on health and welfare issues from 1992 to 1993 and previously a director of Medicare and Medicaid has expressed concern that this might affect seniors access to health care if the changes are made too quickly, while other activists such as Stuart Guterman of the Commonwealth Fund argue that Medicare Advantage plans cost the taxpayer $1,000 per policyholder more than if the person had been insured through traditional fee for services.

=== Illegal immigrants ===
HR 3200 states that illegal immigrants are not eligible for the proposed taxpayer-funded affordable premium credits. Republicans have stated that there is nothing in the bill to enforce this. A group of 21 House Democrats, led by Rep. Michael M. Honda, are trying to change those requirements. He has argued that the restriction "will only add to uncompensated care costs and costly emergency room visits. Costs due to such visits will be shifted and distributed among all those who have been mandated to carry insurance. With skyrocketing health care costs, legislators should do all that we can to contain costs for working American families". The Center for Immigration Studies has also commented on the issue.

=== Abortion funding ===
The Hyde Amendment prohibits federal funding for abortions in government related health programs unless they are performed in cases of rape, incest, or to save the life of the mother. A political controversy has broken out about whether or not the 'public plan' in HR 3200 will cover abortions, which, if done, would be funded by premiums paid by individuals to that agency and not by outside payments. After rejecting Democratic Rep. Lois Capps's amendment to segregate abortion funding, the House of Representatives voted for tighter restrictions on federal funding for elective abortions via the Stupak Amendment.

== Ad campaign funding ==
"America's Health Insurance Plans", a lobbyist group, opposed the bill.

'Americans for Stable Quality Care' is an activist group that has devised television ads in support of this type of healthcare reform. Although the group gets funding from the drug lobby PhRMA as well as from the Service Employees International Union, it does not disclose this fact in the ads themselves. The head of the Public Relations Society of America, Michael Cherenson, has accused the group of dishonest 'front group' manipulations (his group does not use the exact term 'astroturfing' since it respects the trademark). The vice chairperson of PhRMA has disputed the allegation and referred to the campaign as completely "transparent".

== See also ==
- Public opinion on health care reform in the United States
- 111th United States Congress
- Medicare for All Act
- Wyden-Bennett Act
- America's Healthy Future Act
- Qualified Health Benefit Plan
