= Affordable Health Care for America Act =

Proposed U.S. law

The Affordable Health Care for America Act (or HR 3962) was a bill that was drafted by the United States House of Representatives of the 111th United States Congress on October 29, 2009. The bill was sponsored by Representative Charles Rangel. At the encouragement of the Obama administration, the 111th Congress devoted much of its time to enacting reform of the United States' health care system. Known as the "House bill", HR 3962 was the House of Representatives' chief legislative proposal during the health reform debate.

On December 24, 2009, the Senate passed an alternative health care bill, the Patient Protection and Affordable Care Act (H.R. 3590). In 2010, the House abandoned its reform bill in favor of amending the Senate bill (via the reconciliation process) in the form of the Health Care and Education Reconciliation Act of 2010.

== Key provisions ==
The central changes that would have been made by the legislation, had it been enacted, included the following:

- prohibiting health insurers from refusing coverage based on patients' medical histories
- prohibiting health insurers from charging different rates based on patients' medical histories or gender
- repeal of insurance companies' exemption from anti-trust laws
- establishing minimum standards for qualified health benefit plans
- establishing a National Healthcare Workforce Commission to be composed of 15 individuals who will assess healthcare needs and make recommendations to congressional leaders
- requiring most employers to provide coverage for their workers or pay a surtax on the workers wage up to 8%
- restrictions on abortion coverage in any insurance plans for which federal funds are used
- an expansion of Medicaid to include more low-income Americans by increasing Medicaid eligibility limits to 133% of the Federal Poverty Level and by covering adults without dependents as long as either or any segment doesn't fall under the narrow exceptions outlined by various clauses throughout the proposal,
- a subsidy to low- and middle-income Americans to help buy insurance
- a central health insurance exchange where the public can compare policies and rates
- allowing insurers to continue to dictate limits on evaluation and care provided consumers by their physicians ("managed" or "rationed" care)
- avoidance of capitating or regulating premiums which are routinely and in accordance with this law, charged by an insurance company for coverage, which might make the coverage non-affordable with regard to a consumer's income
- requiring most Americans to carry or obtain qualifying health insurance coverage or face a fine for non-compliance
- a 5.4% surtax on individuals whose adjusted gross income exceeds $500,000 ($1 million for married couples filing joint returns)
- a 2.5% excise tax on medical devices
- reductions in projected spending on Medicare of $400 billion over a ten-year period
- inclusion of language originally proposed in the Tax Equity for Domestic Partner and Health Plan Beneficiaries Act
- inclusion of language originally proposed in the Indian Health Care Improvement Act Amendments of 2009
- imposing a $2,500 limit on contributions to flexible spending accounts (FSAs), which allow for payment of health costs with pre-tax funds, to pay for a portion of health care reform costs

=== Comparison with Senate version ===
The main House reform bill was the Affordable Health Care for America Act, which passed on November 7, 2009. The Patient Protection and Affordable Care Act is the Senate version, passed December 24. The following table compares the two versions.

	House	Senate	Notes
New 10-year costs (billions)	$1,052	$848	
Projected 10-year change in deficit (billions)	-$109	-$132	New costs minus new savings and revenue
Number uninsured by 2019 (millions)	17	23	54 without bill
Public option	Yes	No	
Insurance exchanges	Yes	Yes	H: National exchange; S: State-based exchanges
Individual mandate	Yes	Yes	Penalty tax or fine if coverage not carried (See Insurance subsidies below)
Employer mandate	Yes	Yes	Small businesses exempted
Abortion coverage	No	Yes	H: No in public option or subsidized plans; may be covered by separate riders S: Yes, but must be paid for separately without subsidies
New and increased taxes	Yes	Yes	H: Families with income > $1 million S: High-cost insurance plans; Wealthiest Americans Medicare taxes; Indoor tanning tax
Insurance reforms	Yes	Yes	H: Remove anti-trust exemption Both: Define qualified health benefit plan
Expand Medicaid	Yes	Yes	Max 2009 income, family of 4: H: $33,000; S: $29,000.
Insurance subsidies	Yes	Yes	Prorated to $88,000 for family of 4 (2009); H: Premium subsidies; S: Tax credits
Tax equity for domestic partners	Yes	No	

- 2015 year rates are based on the second-tier level of a silver plan that was determined by the D.O.R.A.
- 2015 Federal Poverty Level is now 133% to 401%
- Everyone must obtain health insurance that meets the Minimal Essential Coverage (MEC) that is defined by the department of Human Services (DHS)
- Affordable is based on percentage of 9.5% annual income of an individual
- There is no out of pocket cost of Preventive care even on grandfather plan

== History ==
The bill was introduced on October 29, 2009 and passed on November 7, during the 1st Session of the 111th Congress. Its primary sponsor was the Dean of the House, John Dingell of Michigan. The bill is a revised version of an earlier measure, the proposed America's Affordable Health Choices Act of 2009 (HR 3200). The revisions included refinements designed to meet the goals outlined in the President's address to a joint session of Congress in September, 2009 concerning health care reform.

=== House actions ===
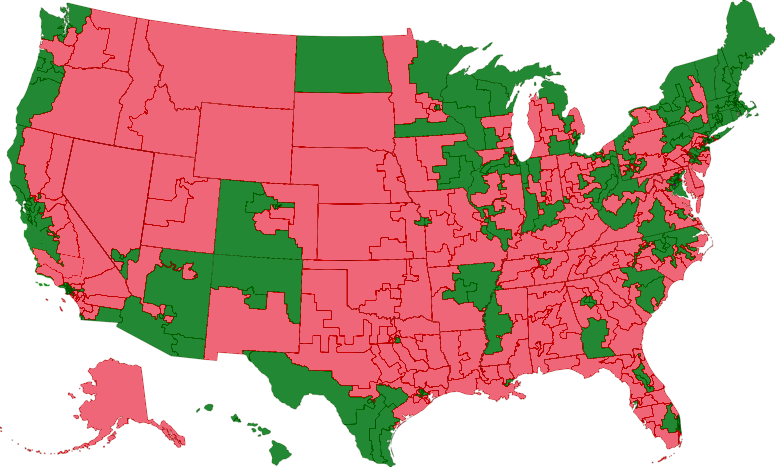
House voting map for H.R. 3590 where green indicates a 'Yes' and red a 'No'.

The Affordable Health Care for America Act, H.R. 3962, was introduced in the House of Representatives on October 29, 2009, and referred to several Committees for consideration.

On November 6, 2009, the House Committee on Energy and Commerce was discharged. The House Committee on Rules introduced House Resolution 903 (H.Res. 903) along with a Committee Report, No. 111-330. The Committee Report detailed the amendments considered as adopted if and when the bill passed the full House in Parts A & B; it provided the Stupak–Pitts Amendment for consideration in Part C as well as the Boehner Amendment, a substitute for the bill, in Part D. The House Resolution outlined the process to be followed for Parts A through D in relation to H.R. 3962 and set the rules for debating the proposed bill.

The following day, House Resolution 903 was voted on and passed. This, in effect, added the amendments outlined in Rules Committee Report No. 111-330, Parts A & B, to H.R. 3962. Part C, the Stupak–Pitts Amendment, was brought up, considered and passed. Part D, the Boehner Substitute Amendment, was then brought up, considered but failed passage.

The newly amended bill eventually passed the House of Representatives at 11:19 PM EST on Saturday, November 7, 2009, by a vote of 220–215. The bill passed with support of the majority of Democrats, together with one Republican who voted only after the necessary 218 votes had already been cast. Thirty-nine Democrats voted against the bill. All members of the House voted, and none voted "present".

Both before and after passage in the House, significant controversy surrounded the Stupak–Pitts Amendment added to the bill to prohibit coverage of abortions – with limited exceptions – in the public option or in any of the exchange's private plans sold to customers receiving federal subsidies. In mid-November, it was reported that 40 House Democrats said they will not support a final bill containing the Amendment's provisions. Stupak has said that 15–20 Democrats will oppose adoption of the Senate bill because of objections to its abortion provisions as well as its tax on high-value health insurance plans. In March 2010, Stupak voted for the Senate language health care bill excluding the Stupak Amendment language.

=== Senate actions ===
The Affordable Health Care for America Act, H.R. 3962, as engrossed or passed by the House of Representatives, was received in the Senate, read into the record and placed on the Senate Legislative Calendar under General Orders (Calendar No. 210, Nov. 16, 2009).

=== H.R. 3962 as eventually enacted ===
A different bill, under the same bill number H.R. 3962, was eventually passed by Congress and, on June 25, 2010, was signed by the President. This is the "Preservation of Access to Care for Medicare Beneficiaries and Pension Relief Act of 2010."

== See also ==
- Patient Protection and Affordable Care Act
- Qualified Health Benefit Plan
