= Qualified Health Benefit Plan =

United States healthcare plan

A Qualified Health Benefits Plan (QHBP) is a healthcare plan that follows rules included in the proposed Affordable Health Care for America Act (H.R. 3962), preceded by America's Affordable Health Choices Act of 2009 (H.R. 3200). These rules include offering a standard set of services, which includes hospital and outpatient care, mental health, prevention, well-child care, and maternity care.

H.R. 3962 would require private insurance plans and the public health insurance option to adhere to a set of standards:

- Guaranteed renewal of insurance
- Guaranteed acceptance, regardless of a person's current health or health history.
- A cap on out-of-pocket costs
- Allow the use of affordability credits so that those with (sudden or long-term) lower incomes can afford insurance
- Competition in the market place and efficiency requirements for private plans to bring the cost of premiums down

It also requires that the public plan be national – available everywhere in the United States.
