= Artie Vierkant =

American digital artist (born 1986)

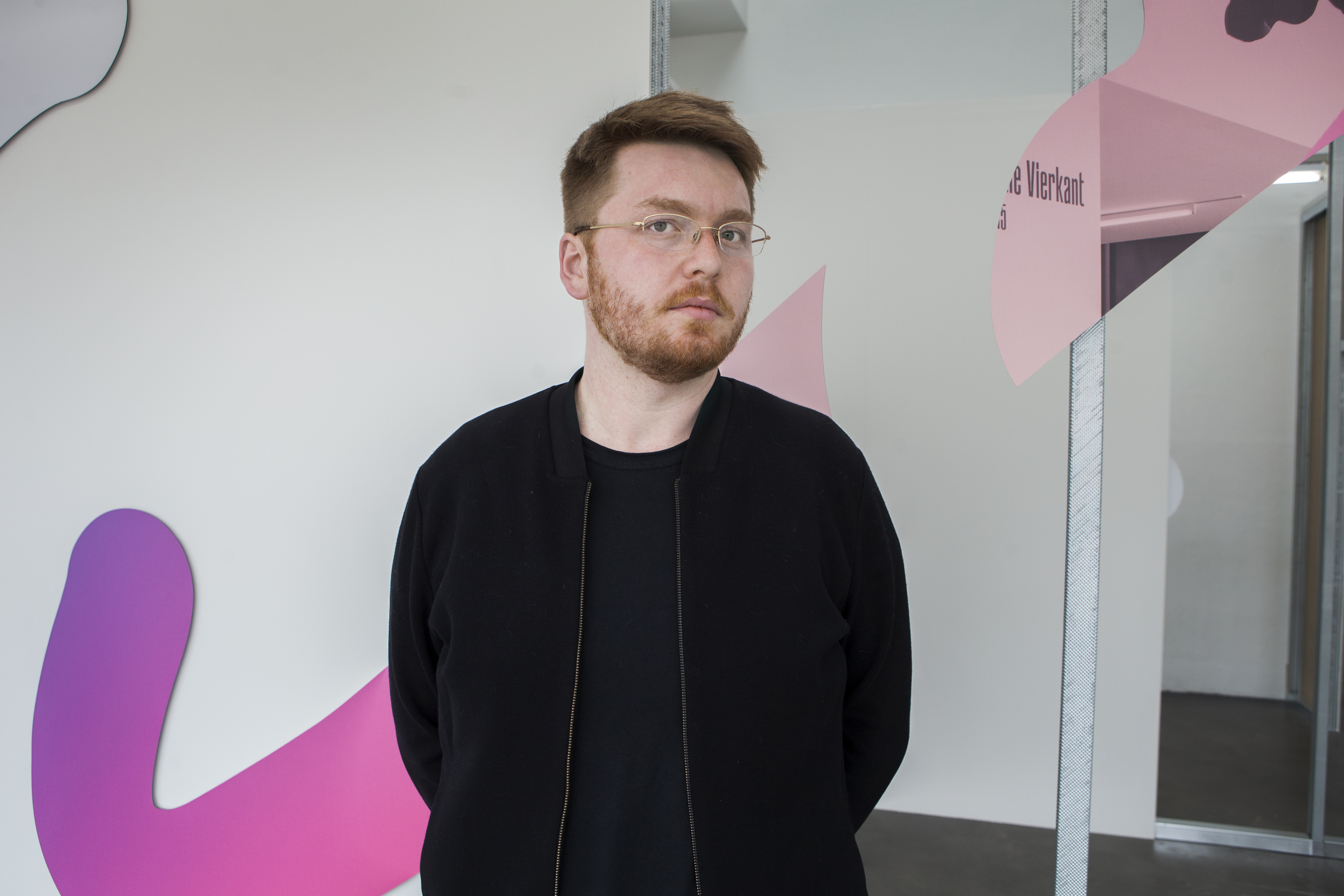
- Vierkant in 2017
- Born: Arthur Benjamin Vierkant; 1986 (age 39–40); Brainerd, Minnesota
- Education: University of Pennsylvania (BA, 2009); University of California, San Diego (MFA, 2011)
- Notable work: Image Objects
- Website: artievierkant.com

Artie Vierkant (born 1986) is an American digital artist based in Brooklyn, New York, known for his Image Objects series.

== Career ==
The Image Objects series is based on the 2010 essay "The Image Object Post-Internet", which he wrote while in graduate school. The series began in 2011 and, as of 2019, is still ongoing. Each work in the series is first created by Vierkant as a digital file on a computer, which he then UV prints out and fits onto a three-dimensional sculpture. As Emily Dubovoy noted in a 2012 Vice article about the series, "...there’s more to it than just the physical objects that one would view in a gallery. The series has another portion to it that lives in, you guessed it, the internet."

In 2013, Vierkant began a series called "Exploits", in which he attempts to stretch the limits of what works of art violate intellectual property laws. In 2018, he released a virtual reality app based on the Image Objects series to coincide with the debut of his exhibition "Rooms greet people by name" at Galerie Perrotin, a European art gallery with its Manhattan branch on the Lower East Side. In a 2018 article in Garage, Paddy Johnson wrote that Vierkant's "...work is distinct from that of colleagues such as Petra Cortright, Michael Staniak, and Michael Manning, all of whom take a more intuitive approach. By contrast, Vierkant is the classic conceptualist, fixated on the distinction between the object and its documentation, and theorizing — in classic Baudrillardian fashion — that representation can exist without reference to an original." Vierkant is also the co-host of the podcast Death Panel, and the co-author (with Beatrice Adler-Bolton) of Health Communism, which was published by Verso Books in October 2022.
