= Death Panel (podcast) =

Leftist podcast focusing on the political economy of health

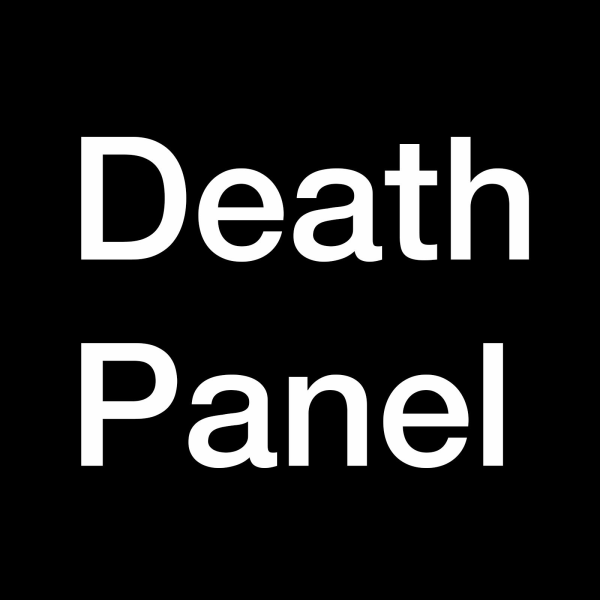
- Genre: Political
- Language: English

Cast and voices
- Hosted by: Beatrice Adler-Bolton; Philip Rocco; Artie Vierkant; Jules Gill-Peterson

Publication
- Original release: November 2018
- Updates: Twice weekly

Related
- Website: www.deathpanel.net

Death Panel is a podcast focusing on the political economy of health. It was founded in November 2018 by Artie Vierkant, Beatrice Adler-Bolton, Vince Patti, and Phil Rocco. The podcast's founders remain its co-hosts, with the exception of Patti and the addition of Jules Gill-Peterson. Much of the original inspiration for the podcast came from Adler-Bolton's experiences interacting with the healthcare system of the United States as someone with two rare diseases (chronic relapsing inflammatory optic neuropathy and granulomatosis with polyangiitis).

In May 2020, Kerry Doran wrote in ARTnews that "The Death Panel has become a cult hit in the art world. Artists Ed Atkins, Ivana Bašić, Hannah Black, Joshua Citarella, Simon Denny, Devin Kenny, Cole Lu, Jayson Musson, and Andrew Ross are among some of the devoted listeners." The podcast is funded through Patreon.

In October 2022, Verso Books published Health Communism by Adler-Bolton and Vierkant, a book which argues for "a conception of health that is possible to work toward within the capitalist system but which is mutually exclusive with this system’s model of health."
