= Jonathan Oberlander =

Jonathan Oberlander is a professor of social medicine at the University of North Carolina at Chapel Hill and author of the 2003 book The Political Life of Medicare.
