= Tax Parity for Health Plan Beneficiaries Act =

The Tax Parity for Health Plan Beneficiaries Act (S. 1171 and H.R. 2088) is a bill in the 112th Congress that would equalize tax treatment for employer-provided health coverage for domestic partners and other non-spouse, non-dependent beneficiaries."

== Previous versions of the bill ==
Previous versions of the bill were introduced in the 108th, 109th, 110th, and 111th Congresses. In each case, the bill never made it out of committee.

The 110th Congress version was introduced as S. 1556 and H.R. 1820 on June 6, 2007. The Senate sponsor was Gordon Smith (R-OR), with 10 cosponsors; in the House, the sponsor was Jim McDermott (D-WA).

The 111th Congress version, the Tax Equity for Domestic Partner and Health Plan Beneficiaries Act, was supported by over 75 major U.S. employers that had joined the Business Coalition for Benefits Tax Equity. The bill was incorporated into the Affordable Health Care for America Act. However, it was removed from the Patient Protection and Affordable Care Act and the Health Care and Education Reconciliation Act of 2010, the health care reform acts that were passed by the House and Senate then signed into law by President Obama.

== Legislative history ==
Congress	Short title	Bill number(s)	Date introduced	Sponsor(s)	# of cosponsors	Latest status
113th Congress	Tax Parity for Health Plan Beneficiaries Act of 2013	S. 728	April 15, 2013	Sen. Charles E. Schumer (D-NY)	9	Referred to the Senate Committee on Finance
113th Congress	Tax Parity for Health Plan Beneficiaries Act of 2013	H.R. 2499	June 25, 2013	Rep. Jim McDermott (D-WA)	34	Referred to the House Committee on Ways and Means Subcommittee on Health
112th Congress	Tax Parity for Health Plan Beneficiaries Act of 2011	S. 1171	June 9, 2011	Sen. Charles E. Schumer (D-NY)	19	Died in the Senate Committee on Finance
112th Congress	Tax Parity for Health Plan Beneficiaries Act of 2011	H.R. 2088	June 2, 2011	Rep. Jim McDermott (D-WA)	74	Died in the House Committee on Ways and Means Subcommittee on Health
111th Congress	Tax Equity for Health Plan Beneficiaries Act of 2009	S. 1153	May 21, 2009	Sen. Charles E. Schumer (D-NY)	23	Died in the Senate Committee on Finance
111th Congress	Tax Equity for Health Plan Beneficiaries Act of 2009	H.R. 2625	June 2, 2009	Rep. Jim McDermott (D-WA)	133	Died in the House Committee on Ways and Means
110th Congress	Tax Equity for Domestic Partner and Health Plan Beneficiaries Act	S. 1556	June 6, 2007	Sen. Gordon H. Smith (R-OR)	25	Died in the Senate Committee on Finance
110th Congress	Tax Equity for Domestic Partner and Health Plan Beneficiaries Act	H.R. 1820	March 29, 2007	Rep. Jim McDermott (D-WA)	119	Died in the House Committee on Ways and Means
109th Congress	Domestic Partner Health Benefits Equity Act	S. 1360	June 30, 2005	Sen. Gordon H. Smith (R-OR)	12	Died in the Senate Committee on Finance
108th Congress	Domestic Partner Health Benefits Equity Act	S. 1702	October 2, 2003	Sen. Gordon H. Smith (R-OR)	9	Died in the Senate Committee on Finance
