= First Amendment Defense Act =

2015 U.S. proposed legislation

The First Amendment Defense Act (often abbreviated FADA) (H.R. 2802) was a bill introduced into the United States House of Representatives and United States Senate on June 17, 2015. The Senate sponsor of the bill was Mike Lee (R-Utah), and the House sponsor was Raúl Labrador (R-Idaho). The bill aimed to prevent the federal government from taking action against a person on the basis that such person believes or acts in accordance with a religious belief or moral conviction that: (1) marriage is or should be recognized as the union of one man and one woman, or (2) sexual relations are properly reserved to such a marriage.

== Provisions ==
The bill provided that the federal government "shall not take any discriminatory action against a person, wholly or partially on the basis that such person believes or acts in accordance with a religious belief or moral conviction that marriage is or should be recognized as the union of one man and one woman, or that sexual relations are properly reserved to such a marriage."

== Timeline ==
The FADA was introduced into both the House and Senate on the same day (June 17, 2015), by Mike Lee and Raul Labrador. As of November 21, 2016, the House version had 172 cosponsors (but it had not been considered by either of the two committees to which it had been referred) and the Senate version had 34 cosponsors.

Mike Lee reintroduced FADA to the Senate on March 8, 2018, with 21 Republican cosponsors.

== Support ==
When asked by Heritage Action, FRC Action, and the American Principles Project if they would pass the bill in their first 100 days in office, three of the top four Republican presidential candidates in the 2016 election said they would. Donald Trump would later come out in support of the bill. It was also supported by the Family Research Council, the American Family Association, and the Liberty Counsel, among other groups, shortly after it was introduced.

== Opposition ==
On July 21, 2015, the Los Angeles Times editorial board wrote that FADA was "unnecessary and could allow discrimination against gays and lesbians." Later that year, Walter Olson of the Cato Institute wrote in Newsweek that the bill does not "try to distinguish rights from frills and privileges," and also criticized it for only protecting those who opposed same-sex marriage, not those who supported same-sex marriage or cohabitation or non-marital sex. It has also been criticized by Ian S. Thompson, legislative director for the American Civil Liberties Union, who claimed that it would, if passed, "open the door to unprecedented taxpayer-funded discrimination against LGBT people."

Many major news corporations, including the New York Times, NBC, The Washington Post, CBS, and CNN, have also published articles bringing to light some of the potential issues with the bill.

The bill has also faced scrutiny from legal officials. Many have voiced similar concerns about the bill regarding its placing more value on the beliefs of some religions over others. Jennifer Pizer, Law and Policy Director at Lambda Legal, explained that "This proposed new law violates both Equal Protection and the Establishment Clause by elevating one set of religious beliefs above all others." When a bill similar to FADA was passed in the state of Mississippi, ordained clergy led a lawsuit on the basis that "because persons who hold contrary religious beliefs are unprotected—the State has put its thumb on the scale to favor some religious beliefs over others."

== State versions ==
In 2015, several states debated bills similar to FADA: Colorado, Georgia, Hawaii, Maine, Michigan, Montana, Nevada, North Carolina, Oklahoma, South Carolina, South Dakota, Texas, Utah, West Virginia and Wyoming. The efforts were unsuccessful in Montana, South Dakota, Utah, West Virginia and Wyoming. Opposition in many of these states came from both the public and from large corporations.

A version of the FADA was introduced in Georgia on January 21, 2016, by Greg Kirk, a Republican state senator. The bill would, if passed, protect government employees who do not want to issue marriage licenses to same-sex couples because they object to the practice for religious reasons. Kirk cited Kentucky county clerk Kim Davis as an example of the people who would be affected by the law. The bill passed the Senate and the House but was blocked by Governor Nathan Deal, who stated: "I think what the New Testament teaches us is that Jesus reached out to those who were considered outcasts." In Arizona, a similar bill passed the state's House and Senate but was vetoed by Governor Jan Brewer.

Bills similar to FADA did pass in Indiana and Arkansas. However, the bills were quickly revised following the public's reaction. In addition to the public's backlash, "One big thing that spurred Indiana's revisions -- and other states not to enact such laws -- was pressure from leading organizations and businesses, including major companies such as Apple, Walmart and Salesforce, as well as sports associations like the NCAA, NBA and NFL.". This pressure from large corporations with strong economic holdings was present in Georgia, too: "A total of 440 companies in the Fortune 500 have a presence in Georgia, according to the state's government. Georgia United Against Discrimination reports that over 400 [of those] companies have come out against the measure, citing tweets from business leaders like Unilever CEO Paul Polman, computer entrepreneur Michael Dell and Microsoft President Brad Smith." Some companies, such as 373K, stated that they planned to move out of Georgia because they worried that the bill will make it "more difficult to recruit workers."

An even more limiting bill in Mississippi, HB 1523, was passed and would have gone into effect in 2016 if United States District Judge Carlton W. Reeves of the United States District Court for the Southern District of Mississippi hadn't blocked the measure the night before it would have taken effect.
