= Gail Wilensky =

American health economist (1943–2024)

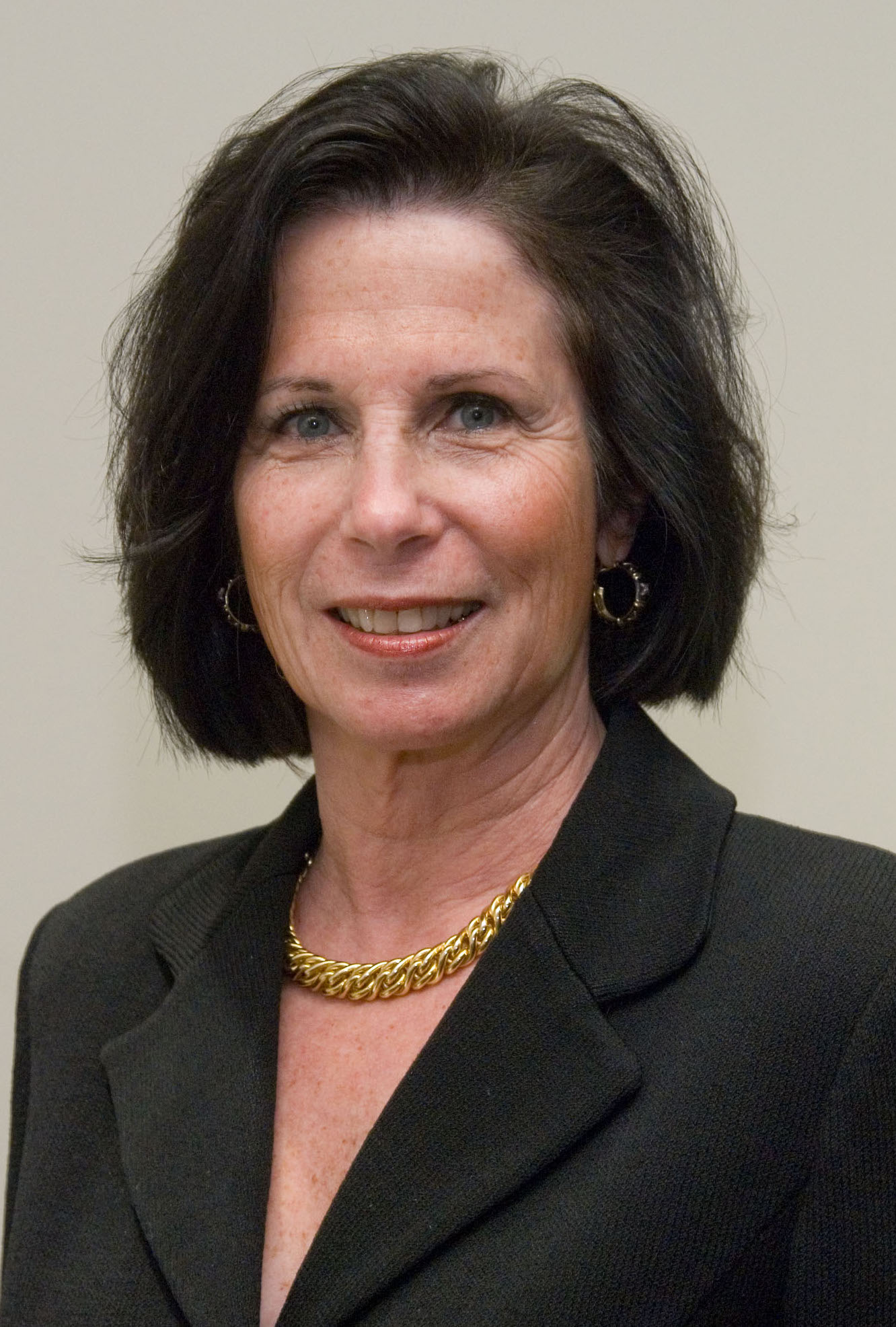

Personal details
- Born: June 14, 1943
- Died: July 11, 2024 (aged 81)
- Political party: Republican
- Education: University of Michigan (BA, MA, PhD)

Gail R. Wilensky (June 14, 1943 – July 11, 2024) was an American health economist who worked for Republican administrations and candidacies.

== Life and career ==
Wilensky headed Medicare under the first president Bush and last worked at Project HOPE. She received an honorary degree from New York Institute of Technology.

Wilensky received a bachelor's degree in psychology and a PhD in economics at the University of Michigan.

Wilensky later served as an external advisory board member for the University of Pennsylvania's Center for Health Incentives & Behavioral Economics (CHIBE).

Wilensky died on July 11, 2024, at the age of 81.
