= America's Healthy Future Act =

Proposed U.S. law

The America's Healthy Future Act (S. 1796) was a bill proposed by Democratic Senator Max Baucus of Montana, who chaired the Senate Finance Committee, on September 16, 2009. It is also colloquially known as the Baucus Health Bill, the Baucus Health Plan, or BaucusCare. Baucus initially publicly released a 223-page summary of the proposal. It started going through the Senate mark-up process on September 22. That amendment process finished Oct. 2, and was passed by the Finance Committee on October 13 by a 14 to 9 vote,. An October CBO report stated that enacting the proposal would, on net, end up reducing the federal deficit by $81 billion over the 2010–2019 period.

== History behind the proposal ==
Chairman Baucus was known as the head of a bipartisan group called the 'Gang of Six' in the Senate Finance Committee. Senators Jeff Bingaman of New Mexico and Kent Conrad of North Dakota made up the other Democratic members of the 'gang', while Olympia Snowe of Maine, Chuck Grassley of Iowa, and Mike Enzi of Wyoming made up the Republican side. They underwent months of negotiations and compromises over the summer of 2009 to achieve a healthcare plan. In the first week of September, Baucus began saying that he would push through a plan even if he could not obtain bipartisan backing. He remarked that "time has come for action, and we will act" on September 9.

Before the proposal was made, President Barack Obama publicly promised that he would not support a plan that would cost more than $900 billion over the next ten years. He also said that a plan could not add to the federal deficit, with every bit of new spending completely offset. The Baucus proposal stalled in the committee in August 2009 due to the town hall meetings faced by members of Congress, in which many opponents attended.

=== Alleged conflicts of interests in its creation ===
Senator Baucus, chairman of the Senate Finance Committee, received over $3 million from the health and insurance industries from 2003 to 2008, more than any other member of Congress. The Republican Ranking Member on the Committee, Senator Chuck Grassley of Iowa, received more than $2 million since 2003. Commentator Jack Cafferty and representatives from the Physicians for a National Health Program and Campaign Money Watch have argued that this lobbying creates a conflict of interest for the Senators. Baucus disputes the allegations, referring to a 2007 meeting reported on by The Wall Street Journal in which he told medical lobbyists "[y]ou should worry about me coming after you."

=== Economic background ===
According to Senator Olympia Snowe (R-ME), the cost of the average employer-provided insurance plan will rise to nearly $31,000 in several years if no health care reform measures are done.

== Proposal details ==
=== Components of the proposal ===
The proposal specifies the creation of health insurance cooperatives, which would be member-controlled, non-profit forms of health insurance that would compete with private insurers. It does not include a public insurance plan. The co-operatives would receive $6 billion in federal funding in 2012 to start off, but they would operate independently after that point. The introduction of the co-ops is intended to drive health care costs downward.

The proposal also creates an individual mandate that requires people to either buy insurance or pay a penalty. Those with incomes below three times the federal poverty level would receive subsidies to purchase their plans. For a family of four, $66,150 would be the dividing line. The penalty would be up to $950 per person or $3,800 per family each year. These measures would come into effect for all American residents in 2013. According to Politico:

Senator John Ensign (R-NV) received a handwritten note Thursday from Joint Committee on Taxation Chief of Staff Tom Barthold confirming the penalty for failing to pay the up to $1,900 fee for not buying health insurance. Violators could be charged with a misdemeanor and could face up to a year in jail or a $25,000 penalty, Barthold wrote on JCT letterhead. He signed it 'Sincerely, Thomas A. Barthold'.

Individuals would be able to buy their insurance from an exchange created in their state, which would be created in 2010. Premiums would be capped at 13% of the buyer's income, with the rest of the costs paid by subsidies. Insurance companies would be required to cover certain services such as hospitalization, maternity care, newborn care, chemotherapy, and pediatric care. Their plans would be presented as either bronze, silver, gold, and platinum options, sorted by the least to the most expensive. Only individuals and firms with fifty or fewer employees would be eligible to use the exchanges until 2017, when states would bring in larger employers. In 2022, they would become open to all. Persons who are not lawfully in the United States would not be permitted to participate in the exchange, either with or without subsidies. According to Baucus:

In order to prevent undocumented immigrants from accessing the state exchanges obtaining federal health care tax credits, the Chairman's Mark requires verification of the following personal data. Name, social security number, and date of birth will be verified with Social Security Administration (SSA) data. For individuals claiming to be U.S. citizens, if the claim of citizenship is consistent with SSA data then the claim will be considered substantiated.

Although the proposal does not establish an employer mandate, which would have required firms to provide insurance for their workers or pay a penalty, the proposal requires businesses with more than fifty employees to pay fees going towards the aforementioned subsidies. The maximum possible fee would either be $400 per full-time employee or the average cost of the subsidies a firm's employee's take in multiplied by the number of those receiving them. The proposal forbids insurance companies from restricting coverage based on 'pre-existing conditions'. The insurance premiums can take into account tobacco use, age, family size, and geographic location. Insurance companies would also be forbidden from setting up lifetime or annual caps that specify a maximum amount of care that customers can receive.

The proposal also includes a new excise tax on so-called 'Cadillac' health care plans that are more expensive and comprehensive than the majority of plans. Any plan costing over $8,000 for an individual and $21,000 for a family would be subject to a 35 percent tax on the amount past those levels. The Center on Budget and Policy Priorities, a liberal-leaning think tank, estimated that about 10 percent of families have plans that would be subject to the tax. The Committee for a Responsible Federal Budget has argued that this tax is beneficial both because it grows fast enough to keep up with new costs and because it can helps to slow health care cost growth. The group has also stated that the tax will cause employers to offer workers higher (taxable) cash wages instead of health benefits, thus generating more government revenue. According to Congress' joint committee on taxation, the proposal would create $215 billion in the next ten years from the tax. Another $93 billion in funds will come from new annual fees imposed on groups such as pharmaceutical companies and medical device manufacturers. Additionally, the Senate Finance Committee approved provisions that would lump Flexible Spending Accounts (FSAs) together with high-cost insurance plans and subject them to the excise tax, which would likely cause many employers to reconsider offering FSAs altogether.

Other funds come a reduction in future Medicare spending, which would be over $400 billion in the next decade. Specifically, payments under the Medicare Advantage system would be decreased by $113 billion in the next decade. The so-called 'doughnut hole' in prescription drug coverage would be closed. In the long term, the proposal would set up an independent commission that could alter payments further.

Additionally, a small portion of funds would come from a new cap imposed on Flexible Spending Accounts (FSAs), pre-tax health benefits that enable millions of Americans to manage their out-of-pocket health care costs. Americans Healthy Future Act would impose a $2,500 limit on contributions to FSAs. Unfortunately, 7 million Americans have FSAs above $2,500, and those with the highest out-of-pocket health care costs- the sickest – would be hit the hardest by the restrictions.

=== CBO scoring of the bill ===
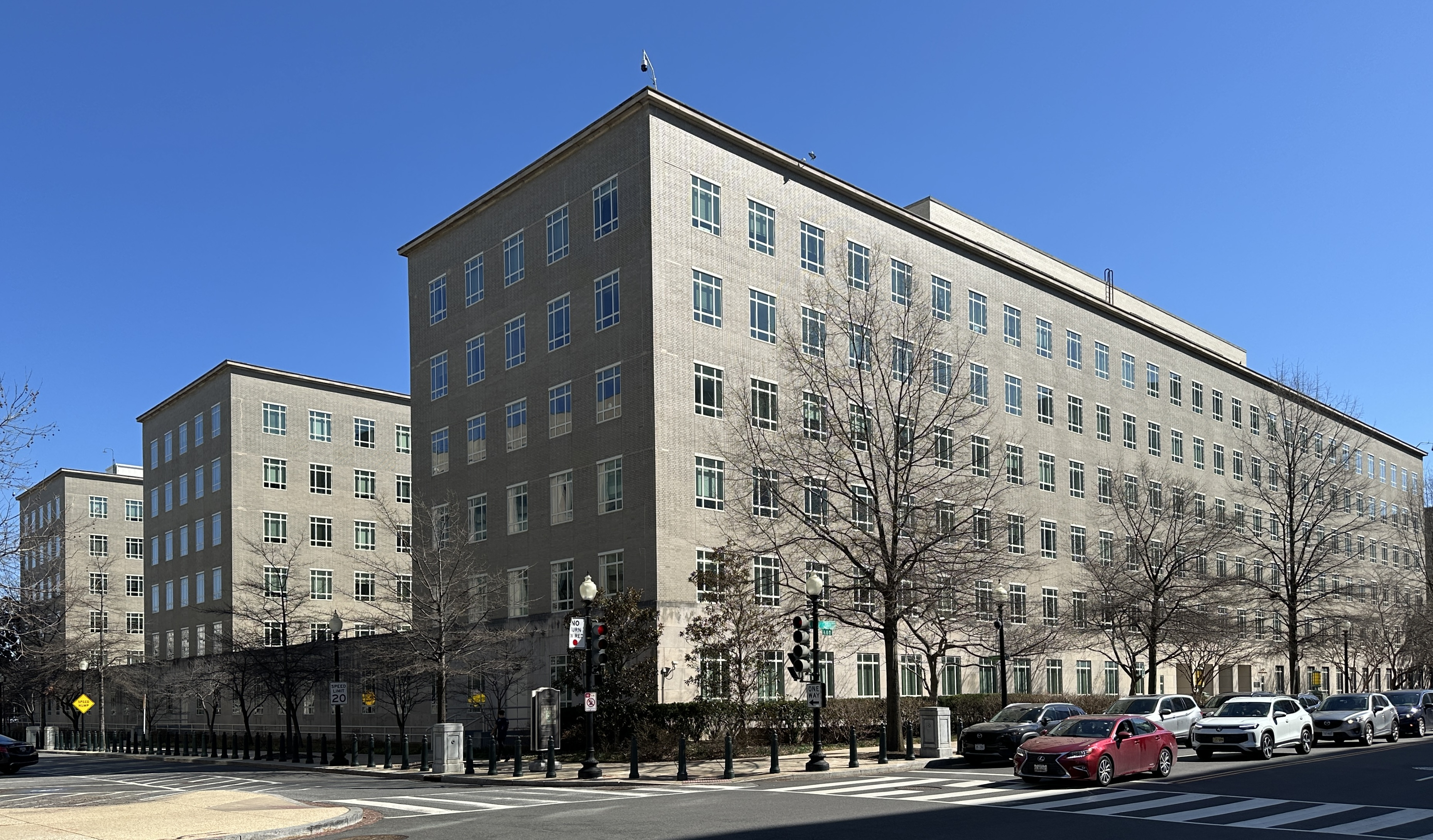
Ford House Office Building, where the CBO is located.

The proposal was initially designed to cost $856 billion over the next ten years. However, the Congressional Budget Office (CBO) stated on September 16 that it would only cost about $774 billion over that period. The CBO report stated that enacting the proposal would, on net, end up reducing the federal deficit by $16 billion in 2019. It also estimated that, by 2019, the number of non-elderly uninsured people would fall about 29 million, which would leave about 25 million of the non-elderly (about one-third undocumented immigrants) still uninsured. Thus, the number of non-elderly legal residents with insurance would rise from about 83% being covered to about 94% being covered. A Forbes.com report has stated that "it's not entirely clear what will happen to health care costs in 2020 and beyond."

On September 24, the CBO re-evaluated the proposal, taking into account the changes created by the Senate Committee. The CBO stated that the proposal would bring in $23 billion in the first ten years. Specifically, the Committee decreased the penalties for avoiding buying insurance, expanded the subsidies, and lowered the excise tax on high end insurance plans. A CBO report issued on October 7 stated that enacting the proposal would, on net, end up reducing the federal deficit by $81 billion over the 2010–2019 period. That report prompted praise from White House Press Secretary Robert Gibbs and from Senate Majority Leader Harry Reid (D-NV), who called the scoring a "landmark occasion". Senate Minority Leader Mitch McConnell (R-KY), criticized the numbers as misleading given that the Baucus proposal would not come into effect for about another five years.

=== Changes to the proposal ===
On September 25, the health correspondent for the News Hour with Jim Lehrer reported that the Committee had cut the proposed tax to medical supplies that belong to 'Class A', which includes items such as condoms and band-aids that cost below $100. Only the other classes would be taxed. On October 14, journalists from the Financial Times stated that the 'Cadillac plans' tax would now impose a 40% fee on any plans exceeding $8,000 a year for individuals and $21,000 a year for families. They also described the individual mandate requirement as "much watered-down", with those earning less than 300% of the federal poverty now subject to a penalty of between $750 and $1,500 a year.

The premium subsidies for low-income individuals included in the final bill were structured to initially limit the premium middle-income people would have to pay for coverage to 12 percent of income. After the first year, however, the subsidy would be based on a percentage of premium rather than a percentage of income. Because costs are expected to rise more quickly than income, over time cost of coverage after subsidies will rise above the initial 12% of income limit.

== Comparisons with other bills ==
Both the House health care reform bill (HR 3200) and the Senate Health, Education, Labor and Pensions Committee's bill (S 1679) had a public plan, however Baucus' proposal did not. The Health, Education, Labor and Pensions Committee is considered to be more liberal than the Finance Committee. According to Norman Ornstein of the American Enterprise Institute, a conservative think tank, the Health Committee's proposal and the House bill would both lead to budget deficits, in contrast to the Baucus plan, which would reduce the debt. Ornstein has argued that this is an important advantage for the Baucus plan. Howard Dean has stated that the majority of Senate Democrats support a more liberal plan. If it reaches the Senate floor, Baucus' proposal will have to be amalgamated with the Health Committee's proposal.

On September 29, the Finance Committee rejected two amendments to add a public plan to Baucus' proposal. Senator Jay Rockefeller's amendment was rejected 15 to 8, with five Democrats (Baucus, Kent Conrad, Blanche Lincoln, Tom Carper, Bill Nelson) and all Republicans voting no. Senator Chuck Schumer's amendment was defeated 13 to 10, with three Democrats (Baucus, Conrad, Lincoln) and all Republicans voting no.

== Finance Committee debate and votes ==
=== Responses from Finance Committee members ===
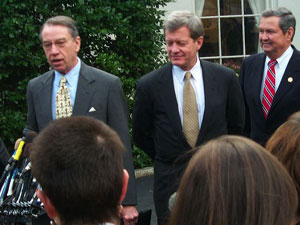
Committee Chairman Max Baucus (center) pictured with Ranking Committee Member Charles Grassley (left)

According to the San Francisco Chronicle, the proposal was "much-anticipated" and it represented the only attempt by a Senate committee to reach bipartisan compromise. McClatchy Newspapers has also called the proposal "closely watched". After its release, the proposal divided Congressional Democrats and attracted no support at all from Congressional Republicans according to National Public Radio health correspondent Julie Rovner.

All of the Republicans on the Senate Finance Committee initially announced opposition to the proposal. Senator Mike Enzi (R-WY) remarked, "[t]his bill does not do enough to lower costs, and in many cases, it will actually increase health-care costs through the new taxes mandated." Senator Olympia Snowe (R-ME) released a statement on Sept. 22 reading that "the mark before us is a solid starting point—but we are far from the finish line." She said in the first week of October that she had not yet decided whether or not to vote for the plan. Norman Ornstein of the AEI has stated that the high cost "Cadillac" insurance plans, which would face a new tax under the Baucus plan, are more common in Maine compared to other states.

=== Amendments and proposed amendments ===
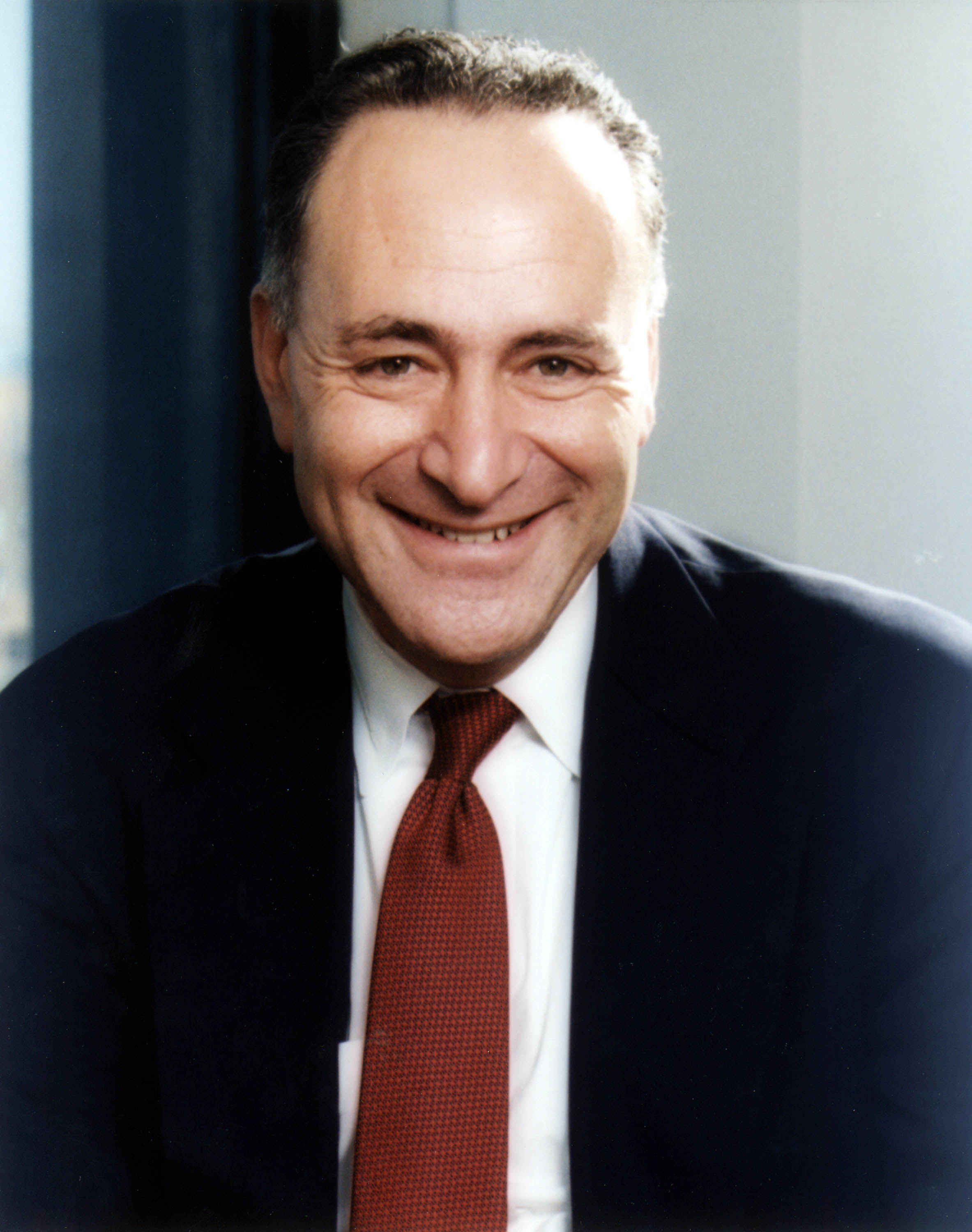
Sen. Charles Schumer.

The amending process, known officially as the 'mark-up', began on September 22. The committee members offered 564 possible amendments, which involved a wide variety of issues. Baucus said in his opening statement, "[t]his is our opportunity to make history." The members, collectively, spent over three hours in their opening comments.

Baucus played a key role in facilitating the recent agreement between the Obama administration and the Pharmaceutical Research and Manufacturers of America in which the group promised an $80 billion reduction in Medicare drug prices over ten years. The administration then promised in return not to make any more financial demands on the group in the future. On Sept. 25, Senator Bill Nelson (D-FL) created an amendment to reverse the deal. The Committee voted 13–10 to reject the amendment.

The Finance Committee also rejected, by 14–9, an amendment removing the individual mandate from the proposal. Senator Jim Bunning (R-KY) proposed the change, which he said would remove an 'un-American' requirement. Baucus labeled the amendment "mortally wounding" to the health care system set forth in the proposal.

Democratic Sen. Charles Schumer of New York, who was Vice-Chairman of the Senate Democratic Conference, introduced an amendment to include a public plan in the proposal. The committee rejected his amendment on September 29, in a 13 to 10 vote. Three Democrats (Baucus, Conrad, Lincoln) and all the Republicans voted no. Schumer had said on September 24, "I think we have a strong chance on the Senate floor to get it."

=== Finance Committee vote ===
On October 13, the Senate Finance Committee made their final vote on the Baucus proposal. The committee passed its bill 14 to 9. All Republicans voted no with the exception of Sen. Olympia Snowe. She later commented, "When history calls, history calls." The San Francisco Chronicle referred to her vote as "a coup" for Baucus, coming after criticism from his fellow Democrats for making too many compromises. Snowe, as well as some moderate Democratic members of the committee, have vowed that they will drop their support for the Baucus plan if a 'public option' is added at any point.

== Responses ==
=== Responses from other lawmakers ===
Senator Tom Harkin (D-IA), who became Chairman of the Senate Committee on Health, Education, Labor, and Pensions following the death of Senator Ted Kennedy (D-MA), generally praised the proposal and was reported as then becoming more "optimistic" that health care reform would pass the Congress in 2009. He also commented, however, that the co-operatives system leaves "a lot to be desired". Senator Ron Wyden (D-OR), a key figure behind the rival Healthy Americans Act, expressed concern that Baucus' plan would not do enough to promote competition in the private insurance marketplace.

In an official GOP weekly message in mid-October, Rep. Kevin Brady of Texas argued that "Americans inherently know government interference drives costs up, not down.... The massive health care plans being crafted behind closed doors in Washington will ultimately allow the government to decide what doctors we can see, what treatments the government thinks you deserve and what medicines you can receive."

=== Responses from the Obama administration ===
The day after Baucus made his proposal, President Barack Obama referred to the plan during a speech at the University of Maryland. He declined to endorse Baucus's plan directly, but he criticized the opponents of his broader goals in health care reform. The crowd of left-leaning college students booed at the mention of Baucus' proposal and cheered at Obama's other comments.

Obama praised the Senate Finance Committee's vote in support of the Baucus plan on a September 13 address. He described the vote as a "critical milestone" and stated that it "has brought us significantly closer to achieving the core objectives I laid out". The President also said, "We are now closer than ever before to passing health care reform, but we're not there yet... Now's the time to dig in and work even harder to get things done."

=== Other responses ===
The U.S. Chamber of Commerce sent a letter to Baucus and Ranking Republican Member Chuck Grassley that labeled the proposal "unacceptable in many areas" while still "the most balanced health reform proposal to be marked up by Congress to date". The group highlighted the proposed tax on high-value insurance plans as unacceptable. Michael D. Tanner, a CATO Institute senior fellow, criticized several aspects of the proposal such as the health care materials tax, which he said "will result in higher health care costs that will be passed on to consumers", and the individual mandate, which he labeled "heavily punitive".

Harold A. Schaitberger, general president of the International Association of Fire Fighters, stated that the proposal "puts a bigger tax on middle-income Americans who are already paying enough". Jim Hoffa, president of the Teamsters union, and Senator Jay Rockefeller (D-WV) also expressed opposition to the health plan tax. President Barack Obama expressed support for the proposed tax, saying that "I do think that giving a disincentive to insurance companies to offer Cadillac plans that don't make people healthier is part of the way that we're going to bring down health care costs for everybody over the long term." Republicans in the Finance Committee have called the tax a violation of Obama's campaign promise to not raise taxes on anyone earning less than $250,000 a year.

The AARP has not objected to the cuts to future Medicare spending in the proposal. Charles Kahn, president of the Federation of American Hospitals, has called the proposal "the right thing to do." The Washington Post has labeled the possible changes as "designed to be relatively painless". The National Council of La Raza opposes the measures in the proposal that require individuals to prove their citizenship status before receiving coverage. The group has created a campaign to leave Senators voice mail messages about the issue.

Former CIGNA VP-turned health care activist Wendell Potter has criticized the Senate Committee for rejecting a public option. He charged that Senators are only taking their positions due to pressure from insurance industries in an interview with Amy Goodman. Howard Dean, former Democratic National Committee chairman, has remarked that "The Baucus bill is the worst piece of healthcare legislation I've seen in 30 years." He has also said, "it's a $60 billion giveaway to the health insurance industry every year... It was written by healthcare lobbyists, so that's not a surprise. It's an outrage."

Americans United for Life (AUL), the first national pro-life organization in the US, has stated that federal taxpayer funding of abortion could still be mandated by the Baucus bill, despite claims to the contrary. AUL's CEO Dr. Charmaine Yoest stated that the bill "provides $6 billion for the establishment of health insurance cooperatives which would be permitted to cover abortion". He also said that if the Hyde Amendment is not renewed, coverage for all abortions would be mandated, under this legislation.

The editors of National Review criticized the plan, arguing that "his proposal resorts to the same kinds of arbitrary fee cuts, taxes, and regulatory payment-control schemes that have been tried many times before and have never worked." The Weekly Standard also ran an article blasting the proposal and stating that it would increase the cost of health insurance premiums through controls such as making individuals buy more comprehensive insurance than they would otherwise want. The Wall Street Journal editorialized that Baucus' plan, a "Rube Goldberg proposal", would eventually lead to a total government takeover of the health care industry.

B'nai B'rith International and the Religious Action Center of Reform Judaism both released statements praising the Senate Finance Committee after its vote in favor of the Baucus plan on October 13. The latter group stated that "Jewish tradition teaches that human life is of infinite value and that the preservation of life supersedes all other consideration. Providing health care is not just an obligation for the patient and the doctor, but for society as well." It also referred to Maimonides' placing of health care first on his list of the ten most important communal services in Maimonides' work Mishneh Torah (Hilchot De'ot IV: 23).

On October 14, journalists from Financial Times stated that "[t]he bill claims that it will bend the fiscal curve by reducing the rate of healthcare inflation.... Economists are sceptical on whether it will achieve this aim." Shawn Tully, editor at large for Fortune, stated on Oct. 9 that the Baucus bill would provide incentives for employers not to provide insurance to its employees. She further argued that at worst the plan would add $90 billion to the CBO's original projection annually.

== See also ==
- Health care reform debate in the United States
- History of health care reform in the United States
- Affordable Health Care for America Act
- Wyden-Bennett Act
- Max Baucus#Health care reform
