= Energy security =

National security considerations of energy availability

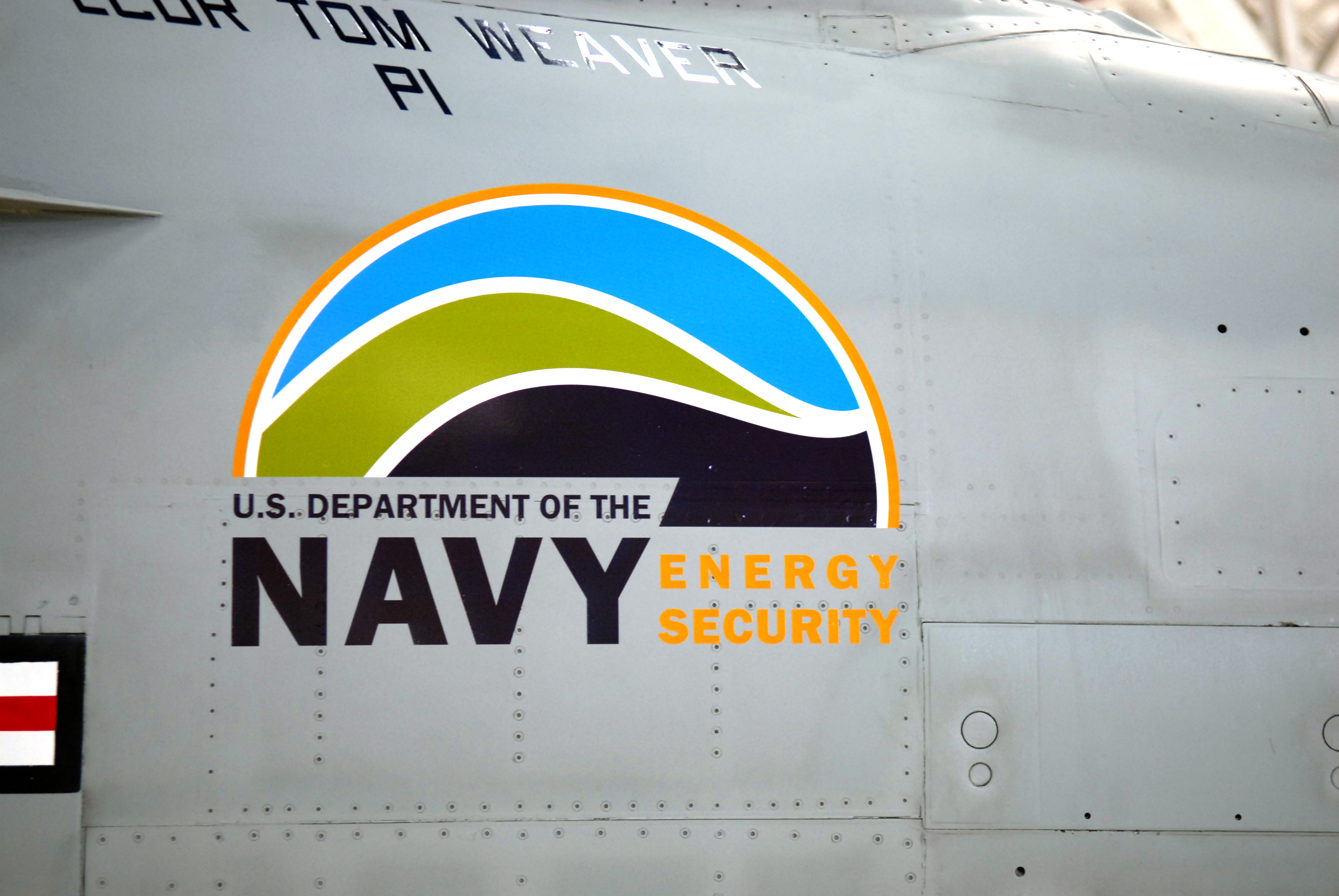
A U.S. Navy F/A-18 Super Hornet displaying an "Energy Security" logo.

Energy security is the association between national security and the availability of natural resources for energy consumption (as opposed to household energy insecurity). Access to cheaper energy has become essential to the functioning of modern economies. However, the uneven distribution of energy supplies among countries has led to significant vulnerabilities. International energy relations have contributed to the globalization of the world leading to energy security and energy vulnerability at the same time.

Renewable resources and significant opportunities for energy efficiency and transitions exist over wide geographical areas, in contrast to other energy sources, which are concentrated in a limited number of countries. Rapid deployment of wind power and solar power and energy efficiency, and technological diversification of energy sources, would result in significant energy security. The International Institute for Sustainable Development says that, done carefully, phasing-out fossil fuel subsidies would increase energy security.

== Threats ==
The modern world relies on a vast energy supply to fuel anything from transportation to communication, to security and health delivery systems. Peak oil expert Michael Ruppert has claimed that for every kilocalorie of food produced in the industrial world, 10 kilocalories of oil and gas energy are invested in the forms of fertilizer, pesticide, packaging, transportation, and running farm equipment. Energy plays an important role in the national security of any given country as a fuel to power the economic engine. Some sectors rely on energy more heavily than others; for example, the Department of Defense relies on petroleum for approximately 77% of its energy needs. Not every sector is as critical as the others; some have greater importance to energy security.

Threats to a nation's energy security include:

- Political/Domestic instability of major energy-producing countries (e.g. change in leadership's environmental values, or regime change)
- Reliance on foreign countries for oil
  - Foreign in-state conflict (e.g. religious civil wars)
  - Foreign exporters' interests (e.g. Quid Pro Quo/blackmail/extortion)
  - Foreign non-state actors targeting the supply and transportation of oil resources (e.g. theft)
- Manipulation of energy supplies (e.g. mega-corporation or state-backed racketeering)
- Competition over energy sources (e.g. biofuel (biodiesel, bioethanol) vs oil (crude, distilled fuel) vs coal vs natural gas vs nuclear vs wind vs solar vs hydro (dam, pumped))
- Unreliable energy stores (e.g. long time to spin a turbine to create power, or Li-ion battery grid explosion, or pumped hydro dam becoming clogged)
- Attacks on supply infrastructure (e.g. hackers stopping flow pumps inside a pipeline or intentionally surging an electrical grid to over/underload it)
  - Terrorism (e.g. napalming oil and/or fuel reserves)
- Accidents (e.g. shoddy weld causing debris buildup in a pipeline)
  - Natural disasters (e.g. wind turbine collapsing from a major earthquake)

Political and economic instability caused by war or other factors, such as strike action, can also prevent the proper functioning of the energy industry in a supplier country. For example, the nationalization of oil in Venezuela has triggered strikes and protests in which Venezuela's oil production rates have yet to recover. Exporters may have political or economic incentive to limit their foreign sales or cause disruptions in the supply chain. Since Venezuela's nationalization of oil, anti-American Hugo Chávez threatened to cut off supplies to the United States more than once. The 1973 oil embargo against the United States is an historical example in which oil supplies were cut off to the United States due to U.S. support of Israel during the Yom Kippur War. This has been done to apply pressure during economic negotiations—such as during the 2007 Russia–Belarus energy dispute. Terrorist attacks targeting oil facilities, pipelines, tankers, refineries, and oil fields are so common they are referred to as "industry risks". Infrastructure for producing the resource is extremely vulnerable to sabotage. One of the worst risks to oil transportation is the exposure of the five ocean chokepoints, like the Iranian-controlled Strait of Hormuz. Anthony Cordesman, a scholar at the Center for Strategic and International Studies in Washington, D.C., warns, "It may take only one asymmetric or conventional attack on a Ghawar Saudi oil field or tankers in the Strait of Hormuz to throw the market into a spiral."

New threats to energy security have emerged in the form of the increased world competition for energy resources due to the increased pace of industrialization in countries such as India and China, as well as due to the increasing consequences of climate change. Although still a minority concern, the possibility of price rises resulting from the peaking of world oil production is also starting to attract the attention of at least the French government. Increased competition over energy resources may also lead to the formation of security compacts to enable an equitable distribution of oil and gas between major powers. However, this may happen at the expense of less developed economies. The Group of Five, precursors to the G8, first met in 1975 to coordinate economic and energy policies in the wake of the 1973 Arab oil embargo, a rise in inflation and a global economic slowdown.

One of the first official documents discussing the topic was "Energy Security: Report to the President of the United States." The working group of this report was headed by William Flynn Martin, Deputy Secretary of Energy. The results were reported to Ronald Reagan in 1987.

== Long-term security ==
The impact of the 1973 oil crisis and the emergence of the OPEC cartel was a particular milestone that prompted some countries to increase their energy security. Japan, almost totally dependent on imported oil, steadily introduced the use of natural gas, nuclear power, high-speed mass transit systems, and implemented energy conservation measures. The United Kingdom began exploiting North Sea oil and gas reserves, and became a net exporter of energy into the 2000s.

Increasing energy security is also one of the reasons behind a block on the development of natural gas imports in Sweden. Greater investment in native renewable energy technologies and energy conservation is envisaged instead. India is carrying out a major hunt for domestic oil to decrease its dependency on OPEC, while Iceland is well advanced in its plans to become energy independent by 2050 through deploying 100% renewable energy.

== Short-term security ==
=== Resilience ===
Some observers contend that idea of "energy independence" is an unrealistic and opaque concept. The alternative offer of "energy resilience" is a goal aligned with economic, security, and energy realities. The notion of resilience in energy was detailed in the 1982 book Brittle Power: Energy Strategy for National Security. The authors argued that simply switching to domestic energy would not be secure inherently because the true weakness is the often interdependent and vulnerable energy infrastructure of a country. Key aspects such as gas lines and the electrical power grid are often centralized and easily susceptible to disruption. They conclude that a "resilient energy supply" is necessary for both national security and the environment. They recommend a focus on energy efficiency and renewable energy that is decentralized. Building key infrastructure underground or party buried or in reinforced shelters can be more resilient and cheaper than retrofitting.

In 2008, former Intel Corporation Chairman and CEO Andrew Grove looked to energy resilience, arguing that complete independence is unfeasible given the global market for energy. He describes energy resilience as the ability to adjust to interruptions in the supply of energy. To that end, he suggests the U.S. make greater use of electricity. Electricity can be produced from a variety of sources. A diverse energy supply will be less affected by the disruption in supply of any one source. He reasons that another feature of electrification is that electricity is "sticky" – meaning the electricity produced in the U.S. is to stay there because it cannot be transported overseas. According to Grove, a key aspect of advancing electrification and energy resilience will be converting the U.S. automotive fleet from gasoline-powered to electric-powered. This, in turn, will require the modernization and expansion of the electrical power grid. As organizations such as The Reform Institute have pointed out, advancements associated with the developing smart grid would facilitate the ability of the grid to absorb vehicles en masse connecting to it to charge their batteries.

=== Petroleum ===
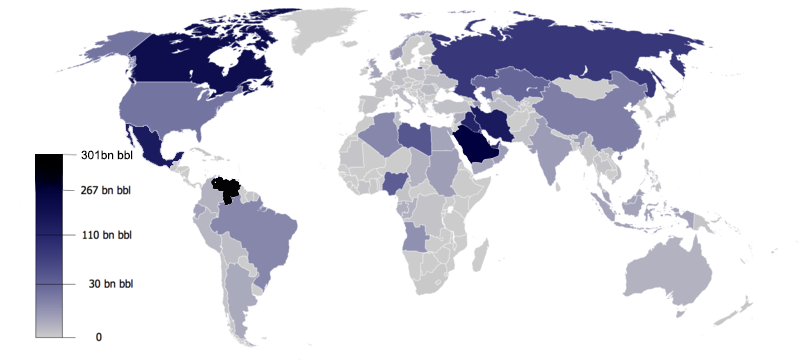
A map of world oil reserves according to OPEC, 2013

Petroleum, otherwise known as "crude oil", has become the resource most used by countries all around the world, including Russia, China and the United States of America. With all the oil wells located around the world, energy security has become a main issue to ensure the safety of the petroleum that is being harvested. In the middle east, oil fields have become main targets for sabotage due to how heavily countries rely on oil. Many countries hold strategic petroleum reserves as a buffer against the economic and political impacts of an energy crisis. For example, all 31 members of the International Energy Agency hold a minimum of 90 days of their oil imports. These countries also committed to passing legislation to develop an emergency response plan in the case of oil supply shocks and other short-term threats to energy security.

The value of such reserves was demonstrated by the relative lack of disruption caused by the 2007 Russia-Belarus energy dispute, when Russia indirectly cut exports to several countries in the European Union.

Due to the theories in peak oil and need to curb demand, the United States military and Department of Defense had made significant cuts, and have been making a number of attempts to come up with more efficient ways to use oil.

=== Natural gas ===
Countries by natural gas proven reserves, based on data from The World Factbook, 2014

Compared to petroleum, reliance on imported natural gas creates significant short-term vulnerabilities. The gas conflicts between Ukraine and Russia of 2006 and 2009 serve as vivid examples of this. Many European countries saw an immediate drop in supply when Russian gas supplies were halted during the Russia-Ukraine gas dispute in 2006.

Natural gas has been a viable source of energy in the world. Consisting of mostly methane, natural gas is produced using two methods: biogenic and thermogenic. Biogenic gas comes from methanogenic organisms located in marshes and landfills, whereas thermogenic gas comes from the anaerobic decay of organic matter deep under the Earth's surface. Russia is one of the three current leading country in production of natural gas alongside US and Saudi Arabia.

In the European Union, security of gas supply is protected by Regulation 2017/1938 of 25 October 2017, which concerns "measures to safeguard the security of gas supply" and took the place of the previous regulation 994/2010 on the same subject. EU policy operates on a number of regional groupings, a network of common gas security risk assessments, and a "solidarity mechanism", which would be activated in the event of a significant gas supply crisis.

A bilateral solidarity agreement was signed between Germany and Denmark on 14 December 2020.

The proposed UK-EU Trade and Cooperation Agreement "provides for a new set of arrangements for extensive technical cooperation ... particularly with regard to security of supply".

=== Nuclear power ===
Uranium production in 2015.

Uranium for nuclear power is mined and enriched in countries including Canada (23% of the world's total in 2007), Australia (21%), Kazakhstan (16%) and more than 10 other countries. Uranium is mined and fuel is manufactured significantly in advance of need.

Nuclear power is seen as a means to reduce carbon emissions. Although generally considered a viable energy resource, nuclear power remains controversial due to the risks associated with it. Another factor in the debate with nuclear power is the concern from people or companies regarding the location of a nuclear energy plant or the disposal radioactive waste nearby.

In 2022, nuclear power provided 10% of the world's total electricity share. The most notable use of nuclear power within the United States is in U.S. Navy aircraft carriers and submarines, which have been exclusively nuclear-powered for several decades. These classes of ship provide the core of the Navy's power, and as such are the single most noteworthy application of nuclear power in the United States.

=== Renewable energy ===
The deployment of renewable fuels:

- Increases the diversity of electricity sources, reducing strangleholds of one fuel type.
- Increases backup energy via biofuel reserves.
- Increases backup electricity stores via batteries that can produce and/or store electricity.
- Contributes to the flexibility of the rigid electrical grid via local generation (independent of easily targeted centralized power distributors).
- Increases resistance to threats to energy security.

For countries where growing dependence on imported gas is a significant energy security issue, renewable technologies can provide alternative sources of electric power as well as possibly displacing electricity demand through direct heat production (e.g. geothermal and burning fuels for heat and electricity). Renewable biofuels for transport represent a key source of diversification from petroleum products. As the finite resources that have been so crucial to survival in the world decline day by day, countries will begin to realize that the need for renewable fuel sources will be more vital than ever before. Moreover, renewable energy resources are more evenly distributed than fossil fuels and, as a result, can improve energy security and reduce geopolitical tensions among states.

Geothermal (renewable and clean energy) can indirectly reduce the need for other sources of fuel. By using the heat from the outer core of the Earth to heat water, steam created from the heated water can not only power electricity-generating turbines, but also eliminate the need for consuming electricity to create hot water for showers, washing machines, dishwashers, sterilizers, and more; geothermal is one of the cleanest and most efficient options, needing fuel to dig deep holes, hot water pumps, and tubing to distribute the hot water. Geothermal not only helps energy security, but also food security via year-round heated greenhouses. Hydroelectric, already incorporated into many dams around the world, produces a lot of energy, usually on demand, and is very easy to produce energy as the dams control the gravity-fed water allowed through gates which spin up turbines located inside of the dam. Biofuels have been researched relatively thoroughly, using several different sources such as sugary corn (very inefficient) and cellulose-rich switchgrass (more efficient) to produce ethanol, and fat-rich algae to produce a synthetic crude oil (or algae-derived ethanol, which is very, very inefficient), these options are substantially cleaner than the consumption of petroleum. "Most life cycle analysis results for perennial and ligno-cellulosic crops conclude that biofuels can supplement anthropogenic energy demands and mitigate green house gas emissions to the atmosphere". Using net-carbon-positive oil to fuel transportation is a major source of green house gases, any one of these developments could replace the energy we derive from oil. Traditional fossil fuel exporters (e.g. Russia) who built their country's wealth from memorialized plant remains (fossil fuels) and have not yet diversified their energy portfolio to include renewable energy have greater national energy insecurity.

In 2021, global renewable energy capacity made record-breaking growth, increasing by 295 gigawatts (295 billion Watts, equivalent to 295,000,000,000 Watts, or a third of a trillion Watts) despite supply chain issues and high raw material prices. The European Union was especially impactful—its annual additions increased nearly 30% to 36 gigawatts in 2021.

The International Energy Agency's 2022 Renewable Energy Market Update predicts that the global capacity of renewables would increase an additional 320 gigawatts. For context, that would almost entirely cover the electricity demand of Germany. However, the report cautioned that current public policies are a threat to future renewable energy growth: "the amount of renewable power capacity added worldwide is expected to plateau in 2023, as continued progress for solar is offset by a 40% decline in hydropower expansion and little change in wind additions."

Solar power is generally less vulnerable to enemy action than large fossil fuel and hydro plants and can be more quickly repaired.

== See also ==
By area

- Category:Energy policy by country
- Cebu Declaration on East Asian Energy Security
- Energy Independence and Security Act of 2007
- Energy Security Act
- Energy security of Afghanistan
- Energy security of the People's Republic of China
- U.S. Energy Independence

Economic

- Energy price
- Energy supply
- Oil Shockwave
- Peak oil

Strategic

- Eco-nationalism
- Energy and Environmental Security Initiative
- Energy independence
- Energy policy
- Energy security and renewable technology
- Energy storage
- Energy superpower
- Global strategic petroleum reserves
- High Speed Rail
- International Energy Agency
- International Energy Forum
- International Risk Governance Council
- National security
- Nationalization of oil supplies
- Pro-nuclear movement
- Quad Critical Minerals Initiative Framework
- Strategic reserve
