= Gang of Six =

In the politics of the United States, the Gang of Six refers to one of three bipartisan groups of six Senators consisting of three Democrats and three Republicans. One group, active in 2009, focused on health care reform in the United States during the 111th United States Congress. A different group, active in 2011, followed up the compromise on the United States public debt from the National Commission on Fiscal Responsibility and Reform. A third group, active in 2018, was focused on the Senate immigration debate.

== Health care, 2009 ==
During 2009, the Gang of Six consisted of six members of the Senate Finance Committee of the 111th United States Congress who attempted to negotiate a compromise to pass a health care reform bill. Among the bills under consideration at the time were the United States National Health Care Act, the America's Affordable Health Choices Act of 2009, the Healthy Americans Act (Wyden–Bennett), and the America's Healthy Future Act (Baucus plan).

The six states the legislators represented – Iowa, Maine, Montana, New Mexico, North Dakota, and Wyoming – had a combined population of 8.4 million, about the same as New York City, or 2.74 percent of the United States as a whole.

Democrats

- Max Baucus (Montana)
- Jeff Bingaman (New Mexico)
- Kent Conrad (North Dakota)

Republicans

- Mike Enzi (Wyoming)
- Chuck Grassley (Iowa)
- Olympia Snowe (Maine)

== National debt, 2011 ==
As of 2011, the Gang of Six was led by Democrat Mark Warner and Republican Saxby Chambliss and included four members of the National Commission on Fiscal Responsibility and Reform.

Democrats

- Mark Warner (Virginia)
- Dick Durbin (Illinois)
- Kent Conrad (North Dakota)

Republicans

- Saxby Chambliss (Georgia)
- Mike Crapo (Idaho)
- Tom Coburn (Oklahoma), left the Gang of Six and later returned

In July 2011, the Gang of Six proposed a solution to the US debt ceiling crisis. The compromise would reduce future increases in the deficit by USD $3.7 trillion over ten years and was praised by President Barack Obama. The deficit figure quoted represents an estimated reduction in the continued growth of the debt. It also has been met with criticism from congressional Republicans and conservative groups for being, according to The Heritage Foundation, "heavy on tax hikes and promises of spending cuts, but devoid of details on how to make the sweeping transformative changes needed to solve our debt and spending crises."

== Immigration debate, 2018 ==
A bipartisan group of six senators proposed changes to border security and immigration laws. This group comprised a rump of the similarly named Gang of Eight. Chuck Schumer (New York) became the Senate Minority Leader in January 2017 (later becoming the Senate Majority Leader in January 2021 after Democrats took the Senate majority) and John McCain (Arizona) was sidelined due to health issues that had been impacting him since July 2017 before eventually dying from those health issues in August 2018.

Democrats

- Dick Durbin (Illinois)
- Michael Bennet (Colorado)
- Robert Menendez (New Jersey)

Republicans

- Jeff Flake (Arizona)
- Lindsey Graham (South Carolina)
- Cory Gardner (Colorado)

== See also ==
- Gang of 14
- Gang of 8
