= Rick Davis (political consultant) =

American political consultant

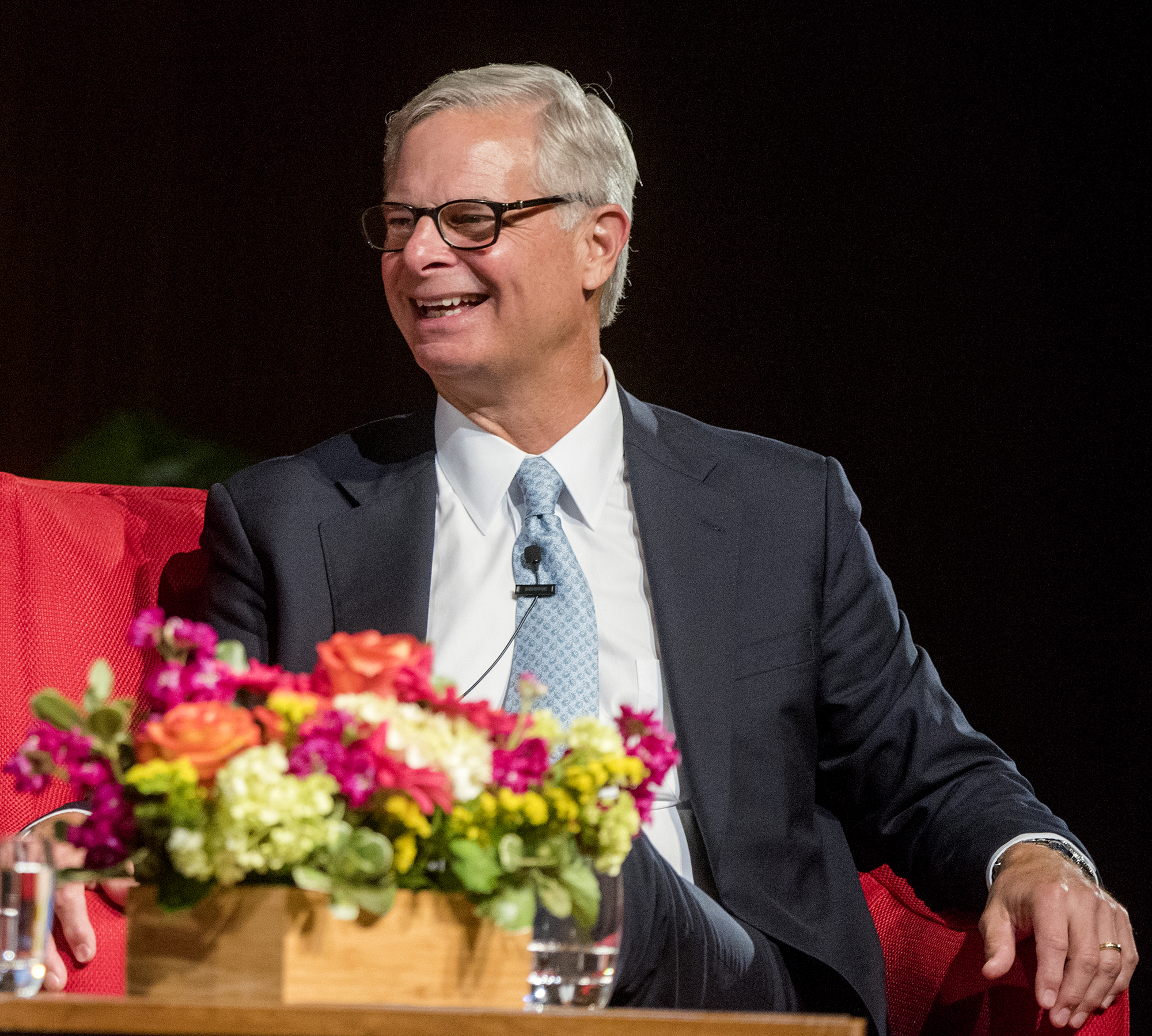
- Born: 1957 (age 68–69)
- Education: University of Alabama (BA)
- Political party: Republican

Richard H. Davis Jr. (born 1957) is an American political consultant. He previously served as a partner and chief operating officer of Pegasus Capital Advisors L.P., a private equity firm specializing in sustainable development projects. He was a managing partner of the business development and public affairs consulting firm Davis-Manafort, located in Alexandria, Virginia. He was the national campaign manager of John McCain's 2008 presidential campaign (from July 11, 2007, to November 4, 2008). In that capacity, he oversaw the development and implementation of all campaign strategy and policy development. Davis also served McCain as national campaign manager for his 2000 presidential campaign (April 6, 1999 to March 9, 2000).

== Career ==
Born to a Navy family, Davis studied at the University of Alabama. After learning the campaign business in Alabama and Mississippi, he became national field director for the College Republican National Committee during Ronald Reagan's 1980 presidential bid.

Davis served on President Ronald Reagan's White House staff from 1985 until March 1987 as a Principal Associate Director in the Office of Cabinet Affairs and Special Assistant to the President. As the associate director, his responsibilities included the coordination and development of US domestic policy in the White House. He oversaw all policy planning and decision-making for issues related to Environment and Energy.

During his tenure at the White House, Davis served as Principal Director of the Domestic Policy Council, in the Office of the Cabinet Secretary. As such he coordinated policies and projects, which included the President's Catastrophic Illness Bill, the Omnibus Health Bill of 1986, the Privatization of Conrail, the President's Space Commercialization Policy, the Rogers Commission, and the President's Competitiveness Package of 1987. Davis was also a member of a number of the interagency working groups including the Special Interagency Working Group on Space, the Health Policy Working Group and the Working Group on Environment.

In addition to his service in the White House, Davis held appointments in the Department of Health and Human Services, the Commerce Department, International Trade Administration, the Department of Interior and the Department of Housing and Urban Development.

In 1990, Davis served as Consultant to the White House Conference on Science and Economic Research Related to Global Climate Change. He managed agenda development and background research for the George H. W. Bush Administration. Over 20 countries participated in the first ever international conference hosted by a President dealing directly with climate change.

He left the Reagan White House to work with longtime lobbyist Paul Manafort, founding the lobbying firm Davis, Manafort. Between 1998 and 2008, the firm was paid at least $2.8 million for lobbying Congress, promoting pro-Russian policies with regard to Ukraine.

Davis serves on the Council on American Politics, which brings leaders from the forefront of today's political and communications arena together to address issues facing the growth and enrichment of GW's Graduate School of Political Management.

=== Domestic political experience ===
- 1976 Chairman, Alabama College Republicans.
- 1979 Staff member, Republican National Committee.
- 1980 Regional Director, Commitment ’80 Reagan/Bush Campaign.
- 1982 Campaign Manager, Paul Trible’s successful US Senate campaign.
- 1984 National Convention Director, Reagan/Bush Re-Election Campaign.
- 1988 Presidential Debate Coordinator, Bush/Quayle 1988 Presidential Campaign.
- 1996 Deputy Campaign Manager, 1996 Presidential Campaign of Senator Bob Dole.

=== International political experience ===
In addition to political campaigns in the United States, Davis has extensive experience as an international political consultant in Asia, Europe and Latin America. Through his firm, Davis Manafort Inc., he has coordinated Presidential, Parliamentary, Gubernatorial and Referendum campaigns in over a dozen countries. His activities also include developing and implementing democracy building campaigns in foreign countries.

=== 2000 Presidential campaign ===
Davis served as Manafort's deputy in orchestrating the 1996 Republican National Convention; both would later join Bob Dole's presidential team. While working for Dole, Davis told a reporter that he was "blown away" by McCain's unconventional politics. He joined McCain's first election bid in 1999, as campaign manager.

=== Homeownership Alliance ===
In 2000, Davis became the head of a group called the Homeownership Alliance, a Fannie Mae and Freddie Mac advocacy group. Its website said that the organization was dedicated to "exposing and defeating trends that would harm consumer access to the lowest-cost mortgage option." He was head of the group for five years, being paid more than $30,000 per month. At the end of 2005, Fannie Mae and Freddie Mac decided that Homeownership Alliance had outlived its usefulness, and it was closed.

=== Reform Institute ===
When McCain started the Reform Institute in 2001 to promote campaign finance reform, he involved Davis. In 2002, Davis was paid $120,000 as an institute consultant; in 2003, he was paid $110,000 in fees. In 2004 and 2005, when he was president of the non-profit institute, his salary totaled $165,000. Tax forms said he worked five hours a week or "as needed."

=== 2008 presidential campaign ===
==== Role ====
In 2006, Davis helped plan McCain's next White House run, envisioning a corporate-style campaign modeled after President Bush's 2004 bid. He began McCain's 2008 presidential election campaign as the chief executive. In July 2007, with the resignations of campaign manager Terry Nelson and chief strategist John Weaver, he took the position of Campaign Manager. In July 2008, Steve Schmidt was brought in to take charge of day to day campaign activities, although Davis retained the title of campaign manager.

==== Payments ====
In 2006, Davis and Manafort formed the company 3eDC, an Internet firm, which the McCain campaign selected to oversee the campaign's Web site and online fund raising. The company was paid $340,000 before the contract's cancellation in April 2007; in mid-June, the campaign reported that it still owed the company $721,000. In all, the McCain campaign paid $971,860 to the company. In June 2008, Campaign Money Watch, a 527 independent political group, filed a federal complaint that the company had improperly reduced the amount the campaign owed it by $107,000. This complaint was found to have no cause and dismissed by the FEC in June 2009.

In April 2008, after McCain became the presumptive Republican nominee, 3eDC was paid $20,000 by the Republican National Committee (RNC). In June 2008, the RNC and 3eDC were negotiating a larger contract that could be worth $2 million or $3 million. FEC expenditure reports for the RNC and the McCain campaign show that this never materialized.

== Controversies ==
=== Payments from Freddie Mac and Fannie Mae ===
On September 21, 2008, The New York Times reported that during the period from 2000 to 2002 (while Franklin Raines was the CEO of Fannie Mae), Davis received nearly $2 million from Fannie Mae and Freddie Mac for consulting services. According to Robert McCarson, a former spokesman for Fannie Mae, "the value that he [Davis] brought to the relationship was the closeness to Senator McCain and the possibility that Senator McCain was going to run for president again." McCarson also claims that "while he worked [at Fannie Mae] from 2000 to 2002, Fannie Mae and Freddie Mac together paid Mr. Davis's firm $35,000 a month.".

Three days later, The New York Times reported that Davis' firm, Davis Manafort, had been paid $15,000 per month by Freddie Mac, for "consulting", from the end of 2005, when Davis stopped being head of the Homeownership Alliance, until August 2008. Payments stopped when Freddie Mac was taken over by the federal government. The Times said that "Davis took a leave from Davis Manafort for the presidential campaign, but as an equity holder continues to benefit from its income."

The McCain campaign responded on September 24 with a statement that Davis had separated from Davis Manafort in 2006, and that "As has been previously reported, Mr. Davis has seen no income from Davis Manafort since 2006. Zero. Mr. Davis has received no salary or compensation since 2006. Mr. Davis has received no profit or partner distributions from that firm on any basis – weekly, bi-weekly, monthly, bi-monthly, quarterly, semi-annual or annual – since 2006. Again, zero. Neither has Mr. Davis received any equity in the firm based on profits derived since his financial separation from Davis Manafort in 2006." On September 28, Newsweek reported that Davis had joined the campaign in January 2007, not in 2006, and that he specified that his $20,000-a-month salary be paid directly to Davis Manafort.

The Times reported that "No one at Davis Manafort other than Mr. Davis was involved in efforts on Freddie Mac’s behalf, the people familiar with the arrangement said." Newsweek reported that during the period of the payments, Freddie Mac had no contact with Davis Manafort other than receiving monthly invoices from the firm and paying them. The only thing that Freddie Mac officials could recall Davis doing for the company, the Times said, was speaking at an October 2006 forum attended by midlevel and senior executives who contributed to Freddie PAC, the company's political action committee.

=== Involvement with Oleg Deripaska ===
In 2005, Davis and his business partner, political consultant Paul J. Manafort, pitched a plan to Russian aluminum magnate Oleg Deripaska under which they would influence news coverage, business dealings, and politics in the former Soviet Union, Europe, and the United States "to benefit President Vladimir Putin's government." They eventually signed a $10 million contract that started in 2006, and maintained a business relationship until at least 2009.

In January 2006, Davis arranged a meeting between McCain, Senator Saxby Chambliss, Senator John Sununu, and Deripaska at a private apartment near Davos, Switzerland, during the World Economic Forum. Deripaska's suspected links to anti-democratic and organized crime figures are so controversial that the U.S. government revoked his entry visa in 2006.

Later that month, Deripaska wrote to Davis and Manafort to thank them for arranging the meeting. "Thank you so much for setting up everything in Klosters so spectacularly," he wrote. "It was very interesting to meet Senators McCain, Chambliss and Sununu in such an intimate setting."

Davis, McCain, and Deripaska dined together with others at a restaurant in Montenegro in August 2008. Davis had been assisting the ruling party with their successful independence campaign, which was bankrolled by Deripaska, the largest employer in Montenegro. McCain was visiting the country as part of an official Senate trip. After the dinner, a group including Davis and McCain traveled to a nearby yacht on the Adriatic Sea for a party celebrating McCain's 70th birthday.

=== DHL ===
In 2003, Davis and his lobbying firm were hired by German logistic company DHL and Airborne Express, to lobby Congress to approve a merger between the two firms. DHL Holdings was eventually successful in acquiring Airborne Express.

McCain and Davis have come under attack by the AFL-CIO for facilitating the deal, as DHL is now planning to quit using the Wilmington, Ohio freight airport as a hub. The airport and package-sorting facility in Wilmington was previously owned by Airborne Express. The move by DHL would cost an estimated 8,000 jobs at the Wilmington air park. At the time of the merger, the deal created an estimated 1,000 jobs for the Wilmington area.

== Fictional portrayals ==
Davis was portrayed by Peter MacNicol in the 2012 HBO film Game Change.

== See also ==
- Timeline of Russian interference in the 2016 United States elections
