= Foundation for a Secure and Prosperous America =

The Foundation for a Secure and Prosperous America or FSPA is a 501(c)(4) nonprofit political organization best known for funding an anonymous television attack advertisement against Kentucky Senator Rand Paul the day after he announced his candidacy for the 2016 United States presidential election. The ad, which aired in multiple states and markets including the early primary states of Iowa, New Hampshire, South Carolina and Nevada, attacks Rand Paul for his alleged support of the Iranian Nuclear Agreement brokered by the Obama Administration. The ad also attacks Rand Paul for past statements about the Iranian nuclear issue and the Iranian government, especially a bit from a 2007 radio interview in which Paul, referring to Iran, stated, "You know, it's ridiculous to think that they're a threat to our national security." Since the ad first aired, Paul himself has clarified his position with respect to the cited statement, explaining "2007 was a long time ago and events do change over long periods of time."

The FSPA reportedly spent one million dollars on the ad run but has declined to list its donors as it is under no legal obligation to do so. The FSPA existed before Paul's candidacy and in fact ran ads in the past. Despite apparent opposition to at least some aspects of Paul's candidacy, the FSPA has not endorsed any particular candidate for any election, including the 2016 US presidential election.

== History ==
Foundation for a Secure and Prosperous America was first granted tax-exempt status by the IRS in September 2008 as a social welfare organization under the 501(c)(4) statute. It is not clear when the entity was founded or whether it succeeded/survived a previous entity. Its earliest known IRS filing was in 2007.

Because of its tax-exempt status and opaque public presence it has been described by both liberal and conservative media outlets and public figures as "secretive," and a "shadow group". John McCain, former US Senator and notable reformer of campaign finance, specifically requested his donors not to contribute to the FSPA despite being the beneficiary of its advertisements. According to Rick Davis, his 2008 Presidential Campaign manager, McCain "condemned this anonymous group’s efforts and asked that they stop airing the advertisement."
