= Health insurance cooperative =

Autonomous non-corporate association of medical risk compensation plan members

A health insurance cooperative is a cooperative entity that has the goal of providing health insurance and is also owned by the people that the organization insures. It is a form of mutual insurance.

== United States ==
In the debate over healthcare reform, healthcare cooperatives are posited as an alternative to both publicly funded healthcare and single-payer healthcare.

Cooperatives had been proposed as part of the healthcare reform debate in the United States by the Barack Obama administration as a possible compromise with Blue Dog Democrats (as well as with Republicans) in the search for universal healthcare in the United States. As proposed by President Obama and others, a future health insurance cooperative would not be government owned or run, but would instead receive an initial government investment and would then be operated as a non-profit organization.

While a health insurance co-op is not strictly run by the government, hence not making it a public entity, it has been described by former Senator Max Baucus of Montana, who was the chairman of the United States Senate Committee on Finance until his retirement from the Senate in 2014, as "tough enough to keep insurance companies’ feet to the fire." He proposed a bill that includes a health insurance cooperative instead of the public option.

There once were numerous rural health cooperatives established by the Farm Security Administration (FSA). Most of them closed or merged over the years, generally because they lacked a sufficient economy of scale (i.e., they were too small to function efficiently). Thus, co-operatives currently have so little market share as to be "invisible".

The bill proposed by Max Baucus, the America's Healthy Future Act, which uses health insurance cooperatives, was estimated by the Congressional Budget Office to cost $829 billion over ten years, and because of the increase in taxes of $210 billion over 10 years on premium insurance plans with high benefits, would lead to a reduction in the deficit of $81 billion. It would expand coverage to 94 percent of all eligible Americans.

=== Support ===
During a September 2009 report by John King of CNN, he stated that "supporters know, here in Minnesota and other farm states think co-ops could solve at least a big chunk of the healthcare access and affordability problem." He interviewed Bill Oemichen, President of the Cooperative Network, who remarked that "where co-ops are, they tend to be very, very high quality because it is the consumer who owns them, that is making sure that their health care provider is a quality health care provider." Oemichen also stated that 65% of those who switched from typical health insurance reported better coverage and service.

In June 2009, Republican Senator Chuck Grassley told reporters, "if it’s all done entirely within the private sector, you know, it doesn’t seem to me it’s got the faults that you have... by having the government institute something." Steven Hill, a program director at the New America Foundation, has written for Salon.com that "co-ops may hold the key to a substantive compromise", comparing the U.S. reform proposals with health care in Germany. He argued that they can produce quality care for less money given that they would lack the profit motive, they would negotiate fees for service, and that they would end current market monopolies that insurance companies have in several states.

=== Criticism ===
Howard Dean and other Democrats have criticized abandoning the idea of a federally run, statewide, public option in favor of co-ops, questioning whether the co-ops would have enough negotiating power to compete with private health insurers. The activist groups SEIU and MoveOn.org have also stated their opposition. 2008 Nobel Economics Laureate Paul Krugman and political commentator Robert Reich have also questioned co-ops' ability to become large enough to reduce health care costs significantly. Thus, they both support the public option instead, which has strong opposition from the insurance industry.

== Examples ==
- Kentucky Health Cooperative (in Liquidation)
- Evergreen Health Cooperative (in Liquidation)
- Consumers Mutual Health Insurance of Michigan (This website is temporarily unavailable, please try again later.)
- Health Republic Insurance - New York, New Jersey, Oregon
- Nevada Health CO-OP - Nevada (in Liquidation)
- Ithaca Health Alliance
- Common Ground Healthcare Cooperative

== See also ==
- Housing cooperative
- Health Insurance Innovations
