= Colorado Option =

Government health insurance plan in Colorado

The Colorado Option is a standardized insurance plan designed by the Colorado state government that health insurance companies are required to provide at reduced premiums. The plans are sometimes described as a "quasi-public health insurance option" due to their use of public-private partnerships instead of a government-run, single-payer system.

== History ==
Colorado is the second state in the United States to pass a "hybrid" public option system, following Washington's passage of Cascade Select in 2019.

The Colorado Option passed its first committee vote in March 2020, but action on the bill was delayed due to the COVID-19 pandemic.

Partnership for America’s Health Care Future, a healthcare lobbying group, advocated against the law in 2021. The group sent out anti-public-option mailers during the legislative period before the legislature abandoned the single-payer public option. Anti-reform groups spent over a million dollars on TV ads opposing the Colorado Option.

Colorado passed the law enacting the program in May 2021.

== Structure ==
The Colorado Option comes in three plan tiers: bronze, silver, and gold. The plans require certain benefits at predetermined costs. Insurance companies compete with costs of premiums and quality of service rather than coverage.

The plan only applies to individuals who purchase health insurance on the open market or are employed by a company with 100 employees or fewer. Since half of Colorado's residents receive insurance through a job and one third receive healthcare through a federal program such as Medicare or Medicaid, only 470,000 Colorado residents (about 8%) as of 2023 were eligible for the hybrid option.

== Effects ==
=== Funding ===
The Colorado Option was expected to save the US federal government $13.3 million in 2023 and up to $147.9 million in 2027 through the use of 1332 waivers. The waiver allows for federal funds to enter the Colorado Option system as pass-through funds. In 2023, $245 million in federal funds went into the program to reduce premiums.

== See also ==
- 2016 Colorado Amendment 69
- CalCare
- Healthcare reform in the United States
