= Healthy Americans Act =

Proposed U.S. law

The Healthy Americans Act (HAA), also known as the Wyden-Bennett Act, is a Senate bill that had proposed to improve healthcare in the United States, with changes that included the establishment of universal health care. It would transition away from employer-provided health insurance, to employer-subsidized insurance, having instead individuals choose their health care plan from state-approved private insurers. It sought to make the cost of health insurance more transparent to consumers, with the expectation being that this would increase market pressures to drive health insurance costs down. The proposal created a system that would be paid for by both public and private contributions. It would establish Healthy Americans Private Insurance Plans (HAPIs) and require those who do not already have health insurance coverage, and who do not oppose health insurance on religious grounds, to enroll themselves and their children in a HAPI. According to its sponsors, it would guarantee universal, affordable, comprehensive, portable, high-quality, private health coverage that is as good or better than Members of Congress have today; A 2008 preliminary analysis by the Congressional Budget Office concluded it would be "essentially" self-financing in the first year that it was fully implemented.

Specific provisions include: Making employer-provided insurance portable by converting the current tax exclusion for health benefits into a tax deduction for individuals; for example, the deduction that a typical family of four would receive would be $19,000 nearly 50% more than the $13,000 they spent on health care; The establishment or identification of a "State Health Help Agency" in each U.S. state government which would administer the HAPI plans in each state, help its citizens evaluate the options available, oversee enrollment, and help with the transition from Medicaid and CHIP, among other responsibilities; The Federal Employees Health Benefits Program and State Children's Health Insurance Program would be replaced; Medicaid participants are transitioned out of that program (the bill's co-sponsor, Senator Ron Wyden (D-Oregon), calls Medicaid a "caste system ... that is unfair" to the poor and to taxpayers).

It was introduced in January 2007 (S. 334) and re-introduced in February 2009 (S. 391), each time with over a dozen co-sponsors from both major parties.

Senators Ron Wyden (D-Oregon) and Robert F. Bennett (R-Utah), the bill's two sponsors, asked the Congressional Budget Office (CBO) and the Joint Committee on Taxation (JCT) to provide a preliminary analysis of a version of the Healthy Americans Act. In a letter dated May 1, 2008, CBO and JCT provided a preliminary conclusion that the proposal would be "roughly budget-neutral in 2014." The letter cautioned, however, that this did not constitute a formal estimate.

== Elements of the bill ==
According to a preliminary analysis by the Congressional Budget Office in May 2008, the bill includes the following elements:

1. Administration of the program is by new state-sponsored "Health Help Agencies" (HHA). States must establish these organizations, which will approve health plans from private insurers, provide for enrollment in plans, and act as a conduit for premium payments from the federal government to individual insurance carriers.
2. All citizens and permanent residents would be required to pay for coverage as part of their federal tax liability. Payment would be made via tax withholding by employers. Individuals would effectively pay the federal government, which would channel the funds to the appropriate HHA and from there to the insurers. Employers would no longer provide basic coverage in most cases.
3. Taxpayers would have a large healthcare standard deduction, which would increase with inflation. This would help taxpayers pay the tax liability that has now replaced insurance premiums. This essentially replaces the tax exclusion for health care benefits presently paid by employers. Certain low-income taxpayers would be eligible for premium assistance.
4. The size of the standard deduction for 2009 would range from $6,000 for individuals to $15,210 for couples with children, with incremental amounts for additional children. As a standard deduction, this reduces the income reported as subject to tax. However, this deduction would phase out for higher-income taxpayers, reducing to zero for couples earning over $250,000.
5. Mandates that employers provide salary and wages increases over a two-year period essentially equal to the amount paid previously for basic healthcare insurance premiums, as employers no longer have to provide basic healthcare coverage.
6. Employers pay a new tax equal to between 3 percent and 26 percent of the national average premium for the minimum benefits package for each employee, depending on their firm size and amount of gross revenues per employee.
7. The basic plan would be equal to the Federal Employee Health Benefits (FEHB) Program, with some exceptions. For example, Medicare and military healthcare recipients would be outside the scope of this bill.
8. Premiums can vary only to reflect geography and smoking status.
9. Individuals can have more expensive (i.e., non-basic) coverage plans paid directly to insurers.
10. Certain individuals would be phased out of the Medicaid program, via participation in their state's HHA.

== CBO analysis of the bill ==
Although the U.S. Congressional Budget Office did a preliminary analysis published in May 2008 that included the following:

Overall, our preliminary analysis indicates that the proposal would be roughly budget-neutral in 2014. That is, our analysis suggests that [the] proposal would be essentially self-financing in the first year that it was fully implemented. That net result reflects large gross changes in Federal revenues and outlays that would roughly offset each other. More specifically, under [the] proposal, most health insurance premiums that are now paid privately would flow through the Federal budget. As a result, total Federal outlays for health insurance premiums in 2014 would be on the order of $1.3 trillion to $1.4 trillion. Those costs would be approximately offset by revenues and savings from several sources: premium payments collected from individuals through their tax returns; revenue raised by replacing the current tax exclusion for health insurance with an income tax deduction; new tax payments by employers to the Federal government; Federal savings on Medicaid and SCHIP; and state maintenance-of-effort payments of their savings from Medicaid and SCHIP ... For the years after 2014, we anticipate that the fiscal impact would improve gradually, so that the proposal would tend to become more than self-financing and thereby would reduce future budget deficits or increase future surpluses.

Wyden argued that "The Healthy Americans Act would guarantee every American universal, affordable, comprehensive, portable, high-quality, private health coverage that is as good or better than Members of Congress have today. The Act includes tough cost containment measures — and would save Americans $1.45 trillion over the next decade."

== Comparison with Obama's proposals ==
Barack Obama campaigned in favor of universal health coverage as early as January 2007. A year later, Obama was differentiating his health care proposal from that of his main rival, Hillary Clinton, by saying "he and [Hillary] Clinton have a philosophical disagreement over her proposal to require Americans to purchase health insurance or face a penalty from the government." By July 2008, Obama was saying he would "lower the country's health care costs enough to "bring down premiums by $2,500 for the typical family" based on investments in electronic medical records, a reduction in administrative costs, and an improvement in prevention programs and management of chronic diseases.

After Obama became president-elect, Wyden and Bennett and the bill's cosponsors wrote a letter to him on November 20, 2008, recommending seven goals for health care reform legislation, goals reflected in HAA:

1. Ensure that all Americans have health care coverage;
2. Make sure health care coverage is affordable and portable;
3. Implement strong private insurance market reforms;
4. Modernize federal tax rules for health coverage;
5. Promote improved disease prevention and wellness activities, as well as better management of chronic illnesses;
6. Make health care prices and choices more transparent so that consumers and providers can make the best choices for their health and health care dollars; and
7. Improve the quality and value of health care services.

Wyden characterized HAA as "harness[ing] the Democratic desire to get everyone covered to the Republican interest in markets and consumer choice" and one that had a reasonable chance of getting 70 votes in the U.S. Senate.

=== Employer-based system ===
In a July 1, 2009 interview, Obama said he agreed "with '90 percent' of Wyden's thinking" but called HAA "radical"; according to The Oregonian:

The president said his discussions with Wyden are similar to those with people who advocate a single-payer system. In theory, those plans work, he said. "The problem is, we have evolved partly by accident into an employer-based system." A "radical restructuring" would meet "significant political resistance," Obama said, and "families who are currently relatively satisfied with their insurance but are worried about rising costs ... would get real nervous about a wholesale change."

In the July 27, 2009 issue of Newsweek, Jacob Weisberg lamented that HAA is "going nowhere" and commented on the existing employer-based health care system:

[W]e're missing the boat most completely by sticking with a workplace-based system that no longer makes sense. America has always been a mobile society, with a labor market that grows more fluid over time. Once, the norm was to work for a single employer for one's entire career. Today, people change jobs an average of 11 times before they reach 40. Fear of losing health coverage keeps people in jobs they would otherwise leave, creating a drag on economic efficiency. The Senate's smartest health-care wonk, Ron Wyden of Oregon, believes we should move away from job-based insurance. He has introduced a bill that would do this by converting the tax deduction for employer-provided health insurance into a tax credit and requiring individuals to use it to buy insurance. This would achieve universal coverage, apply meaningful cost controls, and—according to the Congressional Budget Office—pay for itself within a few years. But Wyden's bill is going nowhere. Instead, Democrats are poised to pass legislation that spends an additional trillion dollars, fails to restrain spending, and shores up an anachronistic employer-based system.

== Senate committee alternatives ==
In November 2008, The Hill pointed out that the Act, despite its two-year head start and its cosponsors from both parties, was in competition with the (then-)undrafted proposals in the works from Senator Max Baucus (D-Montana), chairman of the Senate Committee on Finance, and Ted Kennedy (D-Massachusetts), chairman of the Committee on Health, Education, Labor, and Pensions.

In June 2009, just after the CBO announced that the then-current draft of the bill from Baucus' Finance Committee would increase the federal budget deficit by $1.6 trillion during its first decade and would leave millions of people uninsured, the Wall Street Journal characterized the "less-radical" HAA as "Wyden's Third Way" and pointed out some key differences between the majority's proposal and HAA:

The plans favored by Massachusetts Sen. Ted Kennedy or President Barack Obama rely on a "public option" in which government insurance would supposedly "compete" with private insurers, a move many see as leading to a single-payer system. By contrast, the Wyden-Bennett Healthy Americans Act relies on the private insurance market while imposing a series of regulations to squeeze savings from the private sector. It also requires individuals to buy coverage for themselves, the controversial "individual mandate."

David Brooks of The New York Times provided evidence of the political impediments to HAA, citing an incident witnessed during a May 12, 2009 hearing during which the Senate Finance Committee heard from a "vast majority" of over a dozen experts from the right and the left who "agreed that ending the tax exemption on employer-provided health benefits should be part of a reform package"; according to Brooks, Wyden pointed out to those in attendance that HAA repeals the exemption and provides universal coverage", a comment provoking what Brooks characterized as an "exasperated" look that made it clear that the idea wasn't going to part of his committees legislative drafts. Brooks pointed out that "senators don't run things[, c]hairmen and their staffs run things"; he acknowledged there are "brewing efforts to incorporate a few Wyden-Bennett ideas" but pointed out the "stiff resistance to the aspects that fundamentally change incentives", resistance originating in "committee staffs [that] don't like the approach because it's not what they've been thinking about."

== Debate about the bill ==
According to an analysis published by FactCheck in May 2009, radio advertisements run by the American Federation of State, County and Municipal Employees, the United Food and Commercial Workers, and the National Education Association told only "half the story". The ads correctly noted that HAA would tax health benefits, but they did not point out that HAA also requires employers to give as wages the money they were spending on their employee's health care. The tax owed on that increase in wages is accompanied by a new tax deduction for everyone earning less than $125,000 a year ($250,000 for couples). The new deduction starts at $6,025 per individual, and decreases in stages until the $125,000/$250,000 income caps are met. FactCheck cites a Lewin Group analysis that said "all families that are currently insured (the target of the labor ad) and have income of less than $150,000 a year would see net savings under Wyden's plan."

== Sponsors and co-sponsors ==
The following table lists the sponsors and co-sponsors of the legislation and notes whether they are members of the U.S. Senate Finance Committee, the committee to which the bill was referred.

Senator	Party	State	2007	2009	Notes
Ron Wyden	D	OR	check	check	Member of Finance Committee
Bob Bennett	R	UT	check	check	Lost Republican primary to Mike Lee
Lamar Alexander	R	TN	check	check	
Maria Cantwell	D	WA	check	check	Member of Finance Committee
Thomas R. Carper	D	DE	check		
Norm Coleman	R	MN	check		Lost his Senate seat to Al Franken
Bob Corker	R	TN	check		
Mike Crapo	R	ID	check	check	Member of Finance Committee
Lindsey Graham	R	SC		check	
Chuck Grassley	R	IA	check		Ranking Member of Finance Committee
Judd Gregg	R	NH	check		
Daniel Inouye	D	HI	check	check	
Ted Kaufman	D	DE		check	Joined as co-sponsor in July 2009
Mary Landrieu	D	LA	check	check	
Joe Lieberman	I	CT	check	check	
Trent Lott	R	MS	check		Resigned in 2007
Jeff Merkley	D	OR		check	Elected in 2008
Bill Nelson	D	FL	check	check	Member of Finance Committee
Gordon Smith	R	OR	check		Lost in 2008 to Jeff Merkley
Arlen Specter	R, D	PA	check	check	Changed parties in 2009, lost Democratic primary to Joe Sestak
Debbie Stabenow	D	MI	check	check	Member of Finance Committee

According to Ezra Klein of The Washington Post, the list of HAA Republican supporters is deceptive: "The plan has a lot more fake support than it has real support. If every Republican who has co-sponsored [HAA] would commit to voting for it, the plan might pass. But they haven't." Nevertheless, numerous Senate Republicans reiterated their support for Wyden-Bennett in a 2009 op-ed.
