= Oil Shockwave =

Policy wargaming scenario

The Oil Shockwave event was a policy wargaming scenario created by the joint effort of several energy policy think tanks, the National Commission on Energy Policy and Securing America's Future Energy. It outlined a series of hypothetical international events taking place in December 2005, all related to world supply and demand of petroleum. Participants in the scenario role-played Presidential Cabinet officials, who were asked to discuss and respond to the events. The hypothetical events included civil unrest in OPEC country Nigeria, and coordinated terrorist attacks on ports in Saudi Arabia and Alaska. In the original simulation, the participants had all previously held jobs closely related to their roles in the exercise.

Jason Grumet, from the National Commission on Energy Policy, said that the message of the simulation was that, "very modest disruptions in oil supply, whether they're here at home or abroad can have truly devastating impacts on our nations economy and our overall security."

== Details of the scenario ==
The original event was performed June 23, 2005, and was a simulation of December 2005, six months in the future. The first scenario involved civil unrest in Nigeria, a member of the Organization of Petroleum Exporting Countries, resulting in oil companies and the US government evacuating their personnel from the country. In the simulation, this led to decrease in oil supply and the price spikes causing a variety of negative effects on the United States economy.

More events followed as the scenario progressed, including a very cold winter in the Northern hemisphere, terrorist attacks on Saudi Arabian and Alaskan oil ports, and Al-Qaeda cells hijacking oil tankers and crashing them into the docking facilities at the ports (which might effectively shut down such port for weeks, if not months).

The scenarios were set up with pre-produced scripted news clips. Participants were also given briefing memos with background information related to their specific cabinet positions. The participants discussed and prepared policy recommendations for an unseen Chief Executive after each part of the scenario.

== Original participants ==
The original event was a one-time exercise and used participants that held positions that were identical or closely related to their positions in the simulation. Participants included former administrator of the Environmental Protection Agency Carol Browner, former Director of Central Intelligence Robert Gates, former Marine Corps Commendant and member of the Joint Chiefs of Staff General P.X. Kelley USMC (Ret.), and former National Economic Advisor to the President, Gene Sperling.
