= Healthcare policies of candidates in the 2008 United States presidential election =

This article lists the healthcare statements of some candidates for president during the 2008 US presidential election.

== Barack Obama ==
On January 24, 2007, Mr. Obama spoke about his position on health care at Families USA, a health care advocacy group. Obama said: "The time has come for universal health care in America . . . I am absolutely determined that by the end of the first term of the next president, we should have universal health care in this country." Obama went on to say that he believed that it was wrong that forty-six million Americans are uninsured, noting that taxpayers already pay over $15 billion annually to care for the uninsured.

== Mitt Romney ==
Health insurance: As governor of Massachusetts, Romney signed legislation that required that nearly all Massachusetts residents obtain health insurance coverage by establishing means-tested state subsidies for people without adequate employer insurance, by directing funds designated to compensate for the health costs of the uninsured, and also specified penalties for those who fail to obtain coverage. Legislation, effective on July 1, 2007, requires health insurance for all state residents, provided a plan is available to the individual that is deemed affordable according to state standards. Employers with eleven or more employees are mandated to offer approved insurance plans for employees.
Romney had vetoed eight sections of the health care legislation, including a $295 per person fee on businesses with 11 employees or more that do not provide health insurance. Romney also vetoed provisions providing dental and eyeglass benefits to poor residents on the Medicaid program, and providing health coverage to senior and disabled legal immigrants not eligible for federal Medicaid. However, the state legislature overrode all of the vetoes. It remains to be seen if the resulting law can be fully implemented because of conflicts with the Federal Employee Retirement Income Security Act (ERISA) that limits state regulation of employer health insurance.

== Ron Paul ==
Paul has called for passage of tax relief bills to reduce health care costs for families:

He would support a tax credit for senior citizens who need to pay for costly prescription drugs. He would also allow them to import drugs from other countries at lower prices. He has called for health savings accounts that allow for tax-free savings to be used to pay for prescriptions.

H.R. 3075 allows families to claim a dollar-for-dollar tax credit for health insurance premiums.

H.R. 3076 provides a dollar-for-dollar tax credit that permits consumers to purchase "negative outcomes" insurance prior to undergoing surgery or other serious medical treatments. Negative outcomes insurance is designed to guarantee that those harmed receive fair compensation, while reducing the burden of costly malpractice litigation on the health care system. Patients receive this insurance payout without having to endure lengthy lawsuits, and without having to give away a large portion of their award to a trial lawyer. This also drastically reduces the costs imposed on physicians and hospitals by malpractice litigation. Under HR 3076, individuals who pay taxes can purchase negative outcomes insurance at essentially no cost.

H.R. 3077 creates a $500 per child tax credit for medical expenses and prescription drugs that are not reimbursed by insurance. It also creates a $3,000 tax credit for dependent children with terminal illnesses, cancer, or disabilities.

H.R. 3078 waives the employee portion of Social Security payroll taxes (or self-employment taxes) for individuals with documented serious illnesses or cancer. It also suspends Social Security taxes for primary caregivers with a sick spouse or child.

Paul voted for the Medicare Prescription Drug Price Negotiation Act, which would allow the government to negotiate with pharmaceutical companies to get the best price for drugs provided in the Medicare Part D prescription drug program.

Rep. Paul believes that the more government interference in medicine, the higher prices rise and the less efficient care becomes. He points to how many people today are upset with the HMO system, but few people realize that HMOs came about because of federal mandate in 1973. He also points to the 1974 ERISA law that grants tax benefits to employers for providing insurance but not individuals; he prefers a system which grants tax credits to individuals. He supports the U.S. converting to a free market health care system, saying in an interview on New Hampshire NPR that the present system is akin to a "corporatist-fascist" system which keeps prices high. He says that in industries with freer markets prices go down due to technological innovation, but because of the corporatist system, this is prevented from happening in health care. He opposes socialized health care promoted by Democrats as being harmful because they lead to bigger and less efficient government.

Paul has said that although he prefers tax credits to socialized medicine, he would be willing to "prop up" the current systems of Medicare and Medicaid with money saved by bringing troops home from foreign bases in places such as those in South Korea.

He opposes government regulation of vitamins and minerals (some proposals he opposes would require a prescription for vitamins).
