= The Reform Institute =

American think tank

The Reform Institute was an American non-partisan, not-for-profit think tank based in Alexandria, Virginia, that described itself as centrist oriented. The major policy areas the institute focused on are energy and environmental policy, homeland and national security, economic opportunity and competitiveness, immigration reform, and governance and election reform.

The institute was criticized during the 2000 decade as an extension of Senator John McCain's political ambitions. The New York Times described the institute in this fashion: "In a small office a few miles from Capitol Hill, a handful of top advisers to Senator John McCain run a quiet campaign. They promote his crusade against special interest money in politics. They send out news releases promoting his initiatives. And they raise money--hundreds of thousands of dollars, tapping some McCain backers for more than $50,000 each."

As of April, 2011, the Reform Institute's web page was no longer active and links to it were broken. The institute did not file form 990 with the Internal Revenue Service for 2009.

== Background ==
The Reform Institute was launched in 2001 and grew from the movement to challenge campaign finance practices such as unlimited and undisclosed "soft money" donations. The initial bipartisan honorary co-chairs of the institute's advisory committee were Senator John McCain (R-AZ) and former Senator Robert Kerrey (D-NE). Senator McCain served in the position from 2001–2005. Senator Kerrey was associated with the committee until 2008.

The institute was a part of the broad coalition that successfully secured passage of the Bipartisan Campaign Reform Act of 2002 – also known as McCain–Feingold – the campaign finance reform legislation that among other things prohibited soft money contributions. The institute then turned its focus to defending the law against constitutional challenge and ensuring that it was properly enforced by advocating for the restructuring of the Federal Election Commission (FEC) and calling for regulation of 527 groups operating outside the law's soft money ban.

In addition to its work at the federal level, the institute also engaged in efforts at the state and local level to enact reforms including initiatives on public campaign funding of state and local elections, redistricting reform to eliminate gerrymandering of electoral districts, ballot access, open primaries, and election administration and voter assistance.

== Initiatives ==
In the homeland security field the institute articulated the need for resilience – the ability to withstand and quickly recover from a catastrophic event – to be given equal weight to preventing terrorist attacks in U.S. homeland security policy. It convened a March 2008 national symposium on the subject in New York City and has advanced the concept in Congressional testimony and publications.

On immigration the institute advocated for comprehensive immigration reform – reasoning that balancing security and enforcement with meeting the workforce and economic needs of the country are the best way to fix the nation's immigration system. In 2007 the institute partnered with Brickfish in an online contest to draw attention to the issue by encouraging entrants to express the message they thought the border fence conveyed by virtually designing a portion of it. The viral campaign was recognized by Forrester Research with its Groundswell Award for Social Impact.

The institute's political reform work has included endorsing the successful California Proposition 11 (2008) redistricting ballot initiative, partnering in a national voter assistance hotline in 2008, warning of the threats to judicial independence of the rising sums being raised and spent in judicial elections, supporting public campaign financing initiatives in states like Maryland, Hawaii and Wisconsin, and offering recommendations for Congressional reform.

The institute's energy and environment program included promoting the smart grid and the need for comprehensive energy reform through an April 2009 national symposium in Washington, DC.

The Reform Institute was led by Executive Director Cecilia I. Martinez. Its board of directors was chaired by Paul Bateman of the Klein & Saks Group and included Charles Kolb of the Committee for Economic Development, Lawrence Hebert of the Dominion Advisory Group and political consultant Pam Pryor.

The institute's advisory committee included academics, corporate executives and policy makers. Notable members of the advisory committee included Senator Lindsey Graham (R-SC), former Senator David Boren (D-OK), former Congressman Charles Bass (R-NH), Timothy Farrell of Bank of America, Marie Royce of Alcatel-Lucent, Marc Spitzer of the Federal Energy Regulatory Commission, Matthew Freedman of Global Impact, Inc., Don Murphy of Genn & Murphy, LLC, Robert Kelly of CenTauri Solutions, LLC, Ken Nahigian of Nahigian Strategies, LLC, Dan Ortiz of the University of Virginia School of Law, Thomas Mann of the Brookings Institution, and Norman Ornstein of the American Enterprise Institute.
