= Campaign Money Watch =

Campaign Money Watch is an independent, non-profit, and non-partisan political activist organization, organized as a 527 group. It is primarily known for ads it ran against Republican candidate John McCain in the run up to the 2008 United States presidential election. The group takes in funding from labor unions such as the American Federation of State, County, and Municipal Employees.
