= Public health insurance option =

Proposal for government-run health insurance in the United States

The public health insurance option, also known as the public insurance option or the public option, is a proposal to create a government-run health insurance agency that would compete with other private health insurance companies within the United States. The public option is not the same as publicly funded health care, but was proposed as an alternative health insurance plan offered by the government. The public option was initially proposed for the Patient Protection and Affordable Care Act, but was removed after the independent US senator for Connecticut Joe Lieberman threatened a filibuster.

As a result, Congress did not include the public option in the bill passed under reconciliation. The public option was later supported by Hillary Clinton and the Democratic Party in the 2016 and 2020 elections and multiple other Democratic candidates, including the later President Joe Biden. However, Biden made no attempt to implement a public option in his four years as President.

== History ==
=== Federal ===
The public option was featured in three bills considered by the United States House of Representatives in 2009: the proposed Affordable Health Care for America Act (H.R. 3962), which was passed by the House in 2009, its predecessor, the proposed America's Affordable Health Choices Act (H.R. 3200), and a third bill, the Public Option Act, also referred to as the Medicare You Can Buy Into Act, (H.R. 4789). In the first two bills, the public option took the form of a Qualified Health Benefit Plan competing with similar private insurance plans in an internet-based exchange or marketplace, enabling citizens and small businesses to purchase health insurance meeting a minimum federal standard. The Public Option Act, in contrast, would have allowed all citizens and permanent residents to buy into a public option by participating in the public Medicare program. Individuals covered by other employer plans or by state insurance plans such as Medicare would not have been eligible to obtain coverage from the exchange. The federal government's health insurance plan would have been financed entirely by premiums without subsidy from the federal government, although some plans called for government seed money to get the programs started.

President Barack Obama promoted the idea of the public option while running for election in 2008. Following his election, Obama downplayed the need for a public health insurance option, including calling it a "sliver" of health care reform, but still campaigned for the option up until the health care reform was passed.

Ultimately, the public option was removed from the final bill. While the United States House of Representatives passed a public option in their version of the bill, the public option was voted down in the Senate Finance Committee and the public option was never included in the final Senate bill, instead opting for state-directed health insurance exchanges. Critics of the removal of the public option accused President Obama of making an agreement to drop the public option from the final plan, but the record showed that the agreement was based on vote counts rather than backroom deals, as substantiated by the final vote in the Senate.

In January 2013, Representative Jan Schakowsky and 44 other Democratic representatives introduced H.R. 261, the Public Option Deficit Reduction Act, which would amend the Affordable Care Act to create a public option. The bill would set up a government-run health insurance plan with premiums 5% to 7% percent lower than private insurance. The Congressional Budget Office estimated it would reduce the United States public debt by $104 billion over 10 years. Representative Schakowsky reintroduced the bill as H.R. 265 in January 2015, where it gained 35 cosponsors.

In the run-up to the 2016 Democratic National Convention, the Democratic Platform Committee approved a plank supporting the addition of a public option onto the Affordable Care Act. The decision was seen as a compromise measure between the Hillary Clinton campaign who during the 2016 presidential primaries advocated for keeping and reforming the ACA, and the Bernie Sanders campaign who advocated for repealing and replacing the ACA with a single-payer Medicare for All program. The Clinton campaign stated shortly before the plank was added that as president Clinton would "pursue efforts to give Americans in every state in the country the choice of a public-option insurance plan", while Bernie Sanders applauded the decision to "see that all Americans have the right to choose a public option in their health care exchange, which will lower the cost of healthcare". The call was echoed by President Obama, who in an article for the American Medical Association stated that Congress "should revisit a public plan to compete alongside private insurers in areas of the country where competition is limited."

In the lead-up to the 2020 presidential election, the public option, "once considered too far-reaching", had become "seen as a more moderate alternative" to proposals like Bernie Sanders' Medicare for All plan. A majority of candidates running in the Democratic primary, including Joe Biden and Pete Buttigieg, preferred a healthcare plan that included a public option over a single payer plan, and some candidates who preferred a single payer plan said they would also accept a public option as a compromise or step along the way to single payer, such as Elizabeth Warren, who initially said "there's no excuse for stopping at half-measures" regarding single payer, but would later pivot to supporting the enactment of a public option first before transitioning to a single payer system.

=== State legislation ===
Attempts to implement a public option have also been made at the state level. In May 2019, a law was passed and signed in Washington for the establishment of a public option, which is the first law for a public option to be passed at the state level, and is intended make a public option plan for purchase in 2021. The Cascade Select program which requires private insurance companies to provide alternative plans, known as Cascade Select plans, which are overseen, but not run, by the state; the alternative plans are sold on the ACA marketplace alongside ACA-compliant private insurance plans. The law caps provider payments on Cascade Select plans at 160% of Medicare payment rates. The Washington state law has been variably described as both a "public option" and a "public-private partnership". Similar legislation was passed in 2021 in both Colorado and Nevada.

New Mexico has also passed legislation establishing official studies into a state-level public option and has pursued further action, while Delaware, Oregon, and Massachusetts have completed similar studies looking into state-level public options but have taken no additional action, and other state legislatures have considered either outright enacting a public option or at least passing legislation to establish an official study on a potential public option plan.

== Rationale ==
The purpose behind the public option is to make more affordable health insurance for uninsured citizens who are either unable to afford the premiums of private health insurers or are rejected by private health insurers due to pre-existing condition. Supporters have also argued (and proposed possible ways) that a government insurance company (public option) could put pressure on private health insurance companies to lower their premium costs and accept more reasonable profit margins, while also encouraging them to create more competitive plans with wider coverage, as well as eventually creating a more competitive, reasonably priced healthcare market across the industry by encouraging more efficient treatments and practices, and finally, eventually generating a large source of non-tax revenue for the government, which could help ease the rate of increasing budgetary deficit. Proponents have proposed this would be accomplished by initially paying doctors and hospitals 4%-5% higher for claims than the average paid by private insurers but charging lower premiums than them, thus creating a more widely accepted, competitive product- making it the obvious choice and forcing private health insurers to create their own, similar reasonably priced, more full-featured insurance plans.

A public option would be able to offer such competitive options, as they would not be operating as a traditional for-profit business, whereby the main priority is maximization of profits, as is the case of private health insurers- but instead operate much like a non-profit organization, whereby all funds acquired through premiums, minus operating expenses, could be paid out on claims (directly benefiting the policy holder, rather than a disproportionate amount of revenue generated from premiums paid to the insurer by the policy holder serving typical corporate uses, such as multimillion-dollar executive salaries and bonuses, stock dividends, and excess cash flows).

Additionally, government influence and power would be leveraged to encourage (primarily) hospitals (as well as medical groups and collectives) to switch medical workers currently paid directly by insurers on a claim-by-claim basis (i.e. for each individual procedure) to instead work as cooperatively as possible, in efficient teams, and receive income in salaries, which proponents believed would both be more efficient, and reduce the complexity associated with medical billing, simplifying both accounting and lowering overall healthcare costs. This primarily would only affect doctors, particularly specialists, such as surgeons, as most nurses and medical technicians are already paid salaried wages as well as pressuring healthcare provider groups and hospitals to research and employ the most cost effective methods and treatments, and work in more cooperative teams, which would allow for employees to be salaried, as opposed to the current system where the highest paid workers (mainly doctors and specialized teams) are paid individually for each procedure they perform/patient they treat.

Supporters of a public plan, such as columnist E. J. Dionne of The Washington Post, argue that many places in the United States have monopolies in which one company, or a small set of companies, control the local market for health insurance. Economist and The New York Times columnist Paul Krugman also wrote that local insurance monopolies exist in many of the smaller states, accusing those who oppose the idea of a public insurance plan as defenders of local monopolies. He also argued that traditional ideas of beneficial market competition do not apply to the insurance industry given that insurers mainly compete by risk selection, claiming that "[t]he most successful companies are those that do the best job of denying coverage to those who need it most."

Economist and former US Secretary of Labor Robert Reich have argued that only a "big, national, public option" can force insurance companies to cooperate, share information, and reduce costs while accusing insurance and pharmaceutical companies of leading the campaign against the public option.

Many Democratic politicians were publicly in favor of the public option for a variety of reasons. President Obama continued campaigning for the public option during the debate. In a public rally in Cincinnati on September 7, 2009, President Obama said: "I continue to believe that a public option within the basket of insurance choices would help improve quality and bring down costs." The president also addressed a joint session of Congress on September 9, 2009, reiterating his call for a public insurance option, saying that he had "no interest in putting insurance companies out of business" while saying that the public option would "have to be self-sufficient" and succeed by reducing overhead costs and profit motives. Democratic representative Sheila Jackson-Lee, who represented the 18th congressional district in Houston, believed that a "vigorous public option" would be included in the final bill and would "benefit the state of Texas."

=== Alternative plans ===
The final bill, the Patient Protection and Affordable Care Act, included provisions to open health insurance exchanges in each state by October 1, 2013. As the Act requires Americans to purchase health insurance, the federal government will offer subsidies to Americans with income levels up to four times the federal poverty level.

An alternative proposal is to subsidize private, non-profit health insurance cooperatives to get them to become large and established enough to possibly provide cost savings Democratic politicians such as Howard Dean were critical of abandoning a public option in favor of co-ops, raising questions about the ability of the cooperatives to compete with existing private insurers. Paul Krugman also questioned the ability of cooperatives to compete.

While politically difficult, some politicians and observers have argued for a single-payer system. A bill, the Medicare for All Act, was first proposed by Representative John Conyers in 2003 and has been perennially proposed since, including during the debate on the public option and the Patient Protection and Affordable Care Act. President Obama came out against a single-payer reform, stating in the joint session of Congress that "it makes more sense to build on what works and fix what doesn't, rather than try to build an entirely new system from scratch." Obama had previously expressed that he is a proponent of a single payer universal health care program during an AFL–CIO conference in 2003.

A number of alternatives to the public option were proposed in the Senate. Instead of creating a network of statewide public plans, Senator Olympia Snowe proposed a "trigger" in which a plan would be put into place at some point in the future in states that do not have more than a certain number of private insurance competitors. Senator Tom Carper has proposed an "opt-in" system in which state governments choose for themselves whether or not to institute a public plan. Senator Chuck Schumer has proposed an "opt-out" system in which state governments would initially be part of the network but could choose to avoid offering a public plan.

== Opposition and criticism ==
Both before and after passage in the House, significant controversy surrounded the Stupak–Pitts Amendment, added to the bill to prohibit coverage of abortions – with limited exceptions – in the public option or in any of the health insurance exchange's private plans sold to customers receiving federal subsidies. In mid-November, it was reported that 40 House Democrats would not support a final bill containing the Amendment's provisions. The amendment was abandoned after a deal was struck between Representative Bart Stupak and his voting bloc would vote for the bill as written in exchange for the signing of Executive Order 13535.

Former Congressman and Republican House Minority Whip Eric Cantor has argued that a public plan would compete unfairly with private insurers and drive many of them out of business.

Michael F. Cannon, a senior fellow of the libertarian CATO Institute, has argued that the federal government can hide inefficiencies in its administration and draw away consumers from private insurance even if the government offers an inferior product. A study by the Congressional Budget Office found that profits accounted for only about 3 percent of private health insurance premiums, and Cannon argued that the lack of a profit motive reduces incentives to eliminate wasteful administrative costs.

Robert E. Moffit of The Heritage Foundation argued that a public plan in competition in private plans would likely be used as a "dumping ground" for families and individuals with higher than average health risks. This, in his view, would lead to costs that business should pay being passed onto the taxpayer.

Marcia Angell, M. D., Senior Lecturer in the Department of Social Medicine at Harvard Medical School and former Editor-in-Chief of the New England Journal of Medicine, believes that the result of a public option would be more "under-55's" opting to pay the fine rather than purchase insurance under a public option scenario, instead advocating lowering the Medicare age to 55.

The chief executive of Aetna, Ron Williams, argued against the public option based on issues of fairness. On the News Hour with Jim Lehrer, Williams noted that a public option creates a situation where "you have in essence a player in the industry who is a participant in the market, but also is a regulator and a referee in the game". He said, "we think that those two roles really don't work well."

== Public opinion ==
Public polling has shown mixed support for a public option. A Rasmussen Reports poll taken on August 17–18, 2009, stated that 57% of Americans did not support the current health care bill being considered by Congress that did not include a public option, a change from their findings in July of that year. An NBC News/Wall Street Journal poll, conducted August 15–17, found that 47% of Americans opposed the idea of a public option and 43% expressed support. A July 2009 survey by the Quinnipiac University Polling Institute found that 28% of Americans would like to purchase a public plan while 53% would prefer to have a private plan. It also stated that 69% would support its creation in the first place. Survey USA estimated that the majority of Americans (77%) feel that it is either "quite important" or "extremely important" to "give people a choice of both a public plan administered by the federal government and a private plan for their health insurance" in August 2009. A Pew Research Center report published on October 8, 2009, stated that 55% of Americans favor a government health insurance plan to compete with private plans. The results were very similar to their polling from July, which found 52% support. An October 2009 Washington Post/ABC poll showed 57% support, a USA Today/Gallup survey described by a USA Today article on October 27 found that 50% of Americans supported a government plan proposal, and a poll from November 10 and 11 by Angus Reid Public Opinion found that 52% of Americans supported a public plan. On October 27, journalist Ray Suarez of The News Hour with Jim Lehrer noted that "public opinion researchers say the tide has been shifting over the last several weeks, and now is not spectacularly, but solidly in favor of a public option."

Between October 28 and November 13, 2009, Democratic senator Dick Durbin's campaign organization polled Americans to rank their support for various forms of the "public option" currently under consideration by Congress for inclusion in the final health care reform bill. The 83,954 respondents assigned rankings of 0 to 10. A full national option had the most support, with an 8.56 average, while no public option was least favored, with a 1.10 average.

Polls during 2019 have shown a majority support for a public option, including a Marist poll which found that 70% of Americans supported a public option while 25% opposed it, a Kaiser Family Foundation poll which found that 69% of Americans supported a public option while 29% opposed it, and Quinnipiac poll found that 58% of Americans supported a public option while 27% opposed it.

=== Physician reactions ===
In 2009, a survey designed and conducted by doctors Salomeh Keyhani and Alex Federman of Mount Sinai School of Medicine found that 73% of doctors supported a public option. A survey reported by the New England Journal of Medicine in September, based on a random sample of 6,000 physicians from the American Medical Association, stated that "it seems clear that the majority of U.S. physicians support using both public and private insurance options to expand coverage."

Conversely, a 2009 IBD/TIPP poll of 1,376 physicians showed that 45% of doctors "would consider leaving or taking early retirement" if Congress passes the health care plan wanted by the White House and Democrats. This poll also found that 65% of physicians oppose the White House and Democratic version of health reform. Statistician and polling expert Nate Silver has criticized that IBD/TIPP poll for what he calls its unusual methodology and bias and for the fact that it was incomplete when published as responses were still coming in.

In 2019, the American College of Physicians, the second largest physicians group in the United States, endorsed both single payer and a public option for US healthcare reform.

== See also ==
- Bismarck model
- Colorado Option
- Health care reform in the United States
- International comparisons of health systems
- Multi-payer healthcare
- Publicly funded health care
- SustiNet
