= John Weihing =

American politician (1921–2003)

Member of the Nebraska Legislature from the 48th district
- In office January 7, 1987 – January 9, 1991
- Preceded by: William E. Nichol
- Succeeded by: Joyce Hillman

Personal details
- Born: February 26, 1921 Rocky Ford, Colorado
- Died: February 26, 2003 (aged 82) Denver, Colorado
- Party: Republican
- Spouse: Shirley Ruth Wilkerson (m. 1948)
- Children: 4 (Lawson, Martin, Warren, Adell)
- Education: Colorado State University (B.A.); University of Nebraska (M.S., Ph.D.)
- Occupation: Plant pathologist, university professor

John L. Weihing (February 26, 1921 – February 26, 2003) was a Republican politician and university professor from Nebraska who served as a member of the Nebraska Legislature from the 48th district from 1987 to 1991.

== Early life ==
Weihing was born in Rocky Ford, Colorado, in 1921, and graduated from Rocky Ford High School. He graduated from Colorado State University with his bachelor's degree in 1942, and served in the military during World War II, participating in the Normandy landings as a paratrooper. Upon his return, he attended the University of Nebraska, receiving his master's degree in 1949 and his doctoral degree in 1954. Weihing specialized in plant pathology, and taught at the University of Nebraska in the plant pathology department from 1950 until 1971.

In the 1970s, Weihing worked with State Senator Terry Carpenter to convert the former campus of Hiram Scott College into the University of Nebraska Research and Extension Center in Scottsbluff. He served as the director of the center from 1971 to 1984.

== Nebraska Legislature ==
In 1986, State Senator William E. Nichol announced that he would run for Lieutenant Governor, and Weihing ran to succeed him in the 48th district, which was based in Scottsbluff. In the nonpartisan primary, he faced former Scotts Bluff County Commissioner Clinton Morrison, attorney Joe Romero, and veteran Max Schachter. Weihing placed first in the primary with 42 percent of the vote, and advanced to the general election with Morrison, who placed second with 28 percent. In the general election, Weihing defeated Morrison in a landslide, winning 61–39 percent.

Weihing declined to seek a second term in 1990, observing, "If I were to run and win, at the beginning of the next term I would be 70. It's time to turn the reins over to someone new."

== Death ==
Weihing died on February 26, 2003.
