= Paul Briggs (American football) =

American football player (1920–2011)

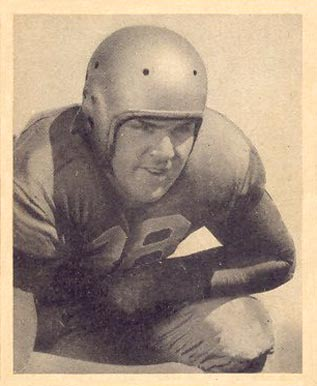
- Briggs on a 1948 Bowman football card

No. 76
- Position: Tackle

Personal information
- Born: April 18, 1920; Providence, Rhode Island, U.S.
- Died: February 14, 2011 (aged 90); Santa Ana, California, U.S.
- Listed height: 6 ft 4 in (1.93 m)
- Listed weight: 248 lb (112 kg)

Career information
- High school: Grand Junction (Grand Junction, Colorado)
- College: Colorado
- NFL draft: 1944: 7th round, 57th overall pick

Career history
- Detroit Lions (1948)

Career NFL statistics
- Games played: 12
- Games started: 2
- Fumble recoveries: 1
- Stats at Pro Football Reference

Paul Leonard Briggs (April 18, 1920 – February 14, 2011) was an American professional football tackle who played one season with the Detroit Lions of the National Football League (NFL). He was selected by the Lions in the seventh round of the 1944 NFL draft after playing college football at the University of Colorado.

== Early life and military career ==
Paul Leonard Briggs was born on April 18, 1920, in Providence, Rhode Island. He attended Grand Junction High School in Grand Junction, Colorado.

Briggs first played college football for the Colorado Buffaloes of the University of Colorado from 1942 to 1943. He joined the United States Navy in 1943 and was stationed on the USS Daly. Briggs earned a Bronze Star and Purple Heart after being hit in the nose and back by shrapnel during a Japanese kamikaze attack. He returned to college after the war and played for the Buffaloes again from 1946 to 1947.

== Professional career ==
Briggs was selected by the Detroit Lions in the seventh round, with the 57th overall pick, of the 1944 NFL draft. He signed with the Lions in 1948. He played in all 12 games, starting two, during the 1948 season and recovered one fumble.

== Post-playing career ==
Briggs was the head football coach of Bakersfield High School in Bakersfield, California from 1953 to 1985. He was head coach of Rocky Ford High School in Rocky Ford, Colorado from 1949 to 1950 and head coach of Natrona County High School from 1951 to 1952. Briggs was also an assistant coach at Orange Coast College from 1985 to 2005.

He was inducted into the University of Colorado Hall of Honor in 1974, Citizens Athletic Foundation High School Hall of Fame in 1975, California Coaches Association Hall of Fame in 1977, Bob Elias Kern County Sports Hall of Fame in 1978 and Bakersfield High School Football Hall of Fame in 2006. The Coach Paul Briggs Scholarship Fund was started at Bakersfield High.

Briggs died on February 14, 2011, in Santa Ana, California.
