= 116th United States Congress =

2019–2021 U.S. legislative term

←	115th	117th	→
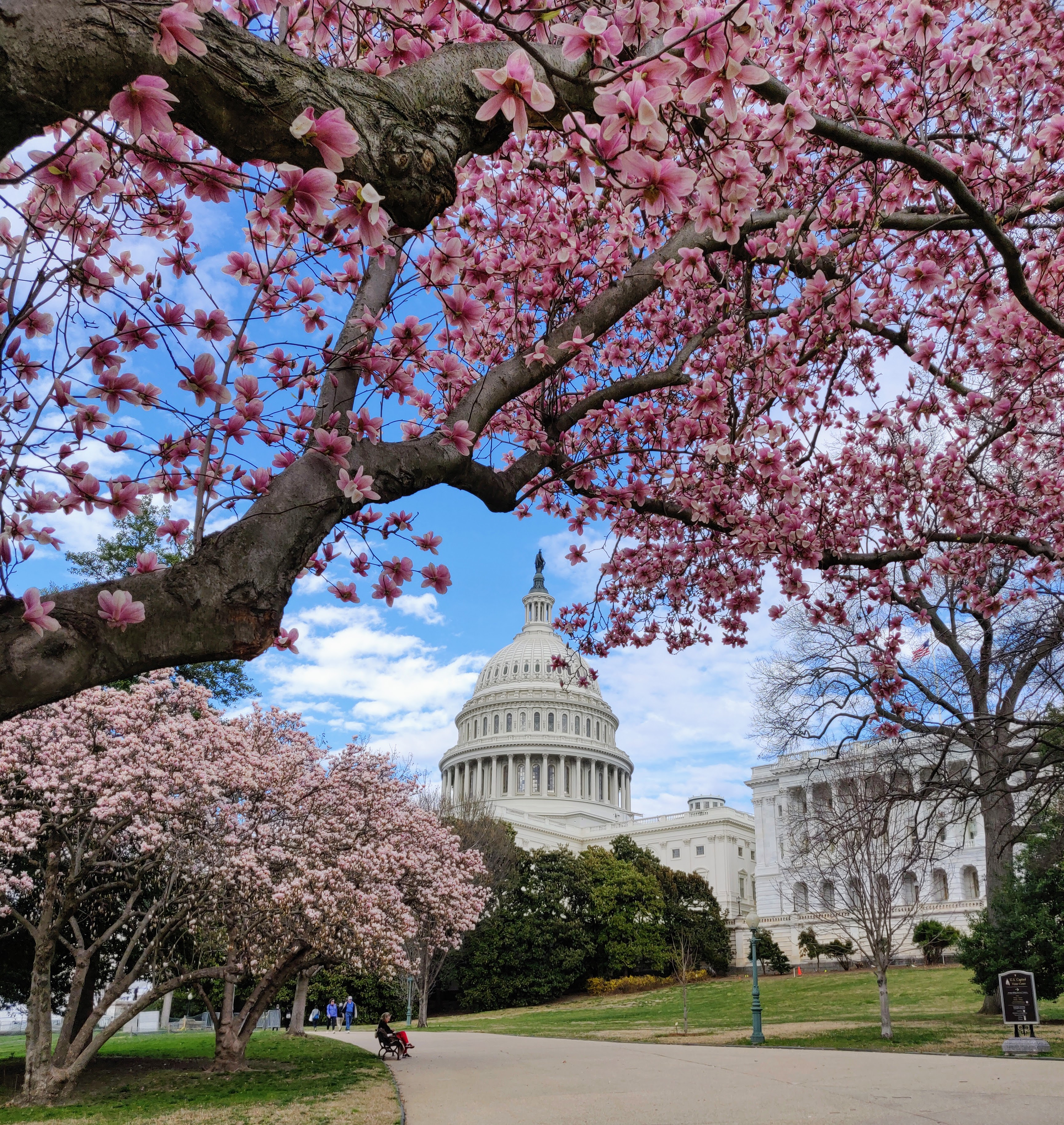
- United States Capitol (2020)

Overview
- Legislative body: United States Congress
- Jurisdiction: United States
- Term: January 3, 2019 – January 3, 2021

Senate
- Members: 100
- President: Mike Pence (R)
- President pro tempore: Chuck Grassley (R)
- Party control: Republican

House of Representatives
- Members: 435 representatives 6 non-voting delegates
- Speaker: Nancy Pelosi (D)
- Party control: Democratic

Sessions
- 1st: January 3, 2019 – January 3, 2020
- 2nd: January 3, 2020 – January 3, 2021

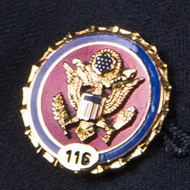
116th U.S. Congress House of Representatives member pin

Opening day ceremonies

House Floor

Senate Floor

The 116th United States Congress was a meeting of the legislative branch of the United States federal government, composed of the Senate and the House of Representatives. It convened in Washington, D.C., on January 3, 2019, and ended on January 3, 2021, during the final two years of Donald Trump's first presidency. Senators elected to regular terms in 2014 finished their terms in this Congress, and House seats were apportioned based on the 2010 census.

In the November 2018 midterm elections, the Democratic Party won a new majority in the House, while the Republican Party increased its majority in the Senate. Consequently, this was the first split Congress since the 113th Congress of 2013–2015 and the first Republican Senate–Democratic House split since the 99th Congress of 1985–1987. The incoming members of this Congress were the youngest by mean age since the 112th Congress of 2011–2013 and made up the most demographically diverse freshman class in history.

Upon joining the Libertarian Party on May 1, 2020, Justin Amash became the first member of Congress to represent a political party other than the Democrats or the Republicans since Rep. William Carney, who served as a Conservative before switching to the Republican Party in 1985. Before joining the Libertarian Party, Amash had been serving as an independent since his departure from the Republican Party on July 4, 2019. Paul Mitchell also left the Republicans in December 2020, becoming an independent. Neither incumbent ran for re-election. This is the most recent Congress to feature at least one member from the Kennedy family.

== Major events ==
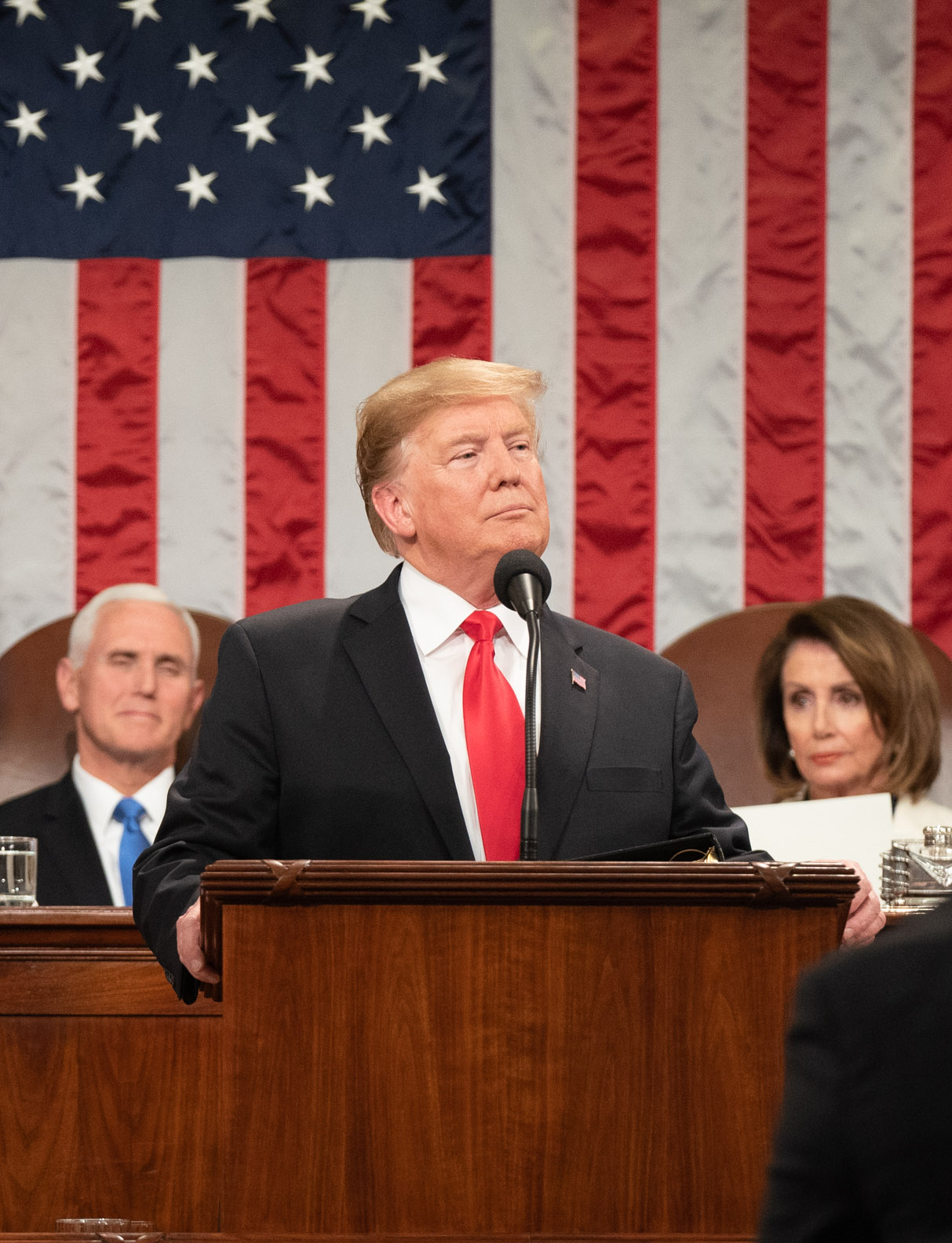
President Trump during his 2019 State of the Union Address, with Vice President Mike Pence and House Speaker Nancy Pelosi.

Robert Mueller's statements as special counsel.

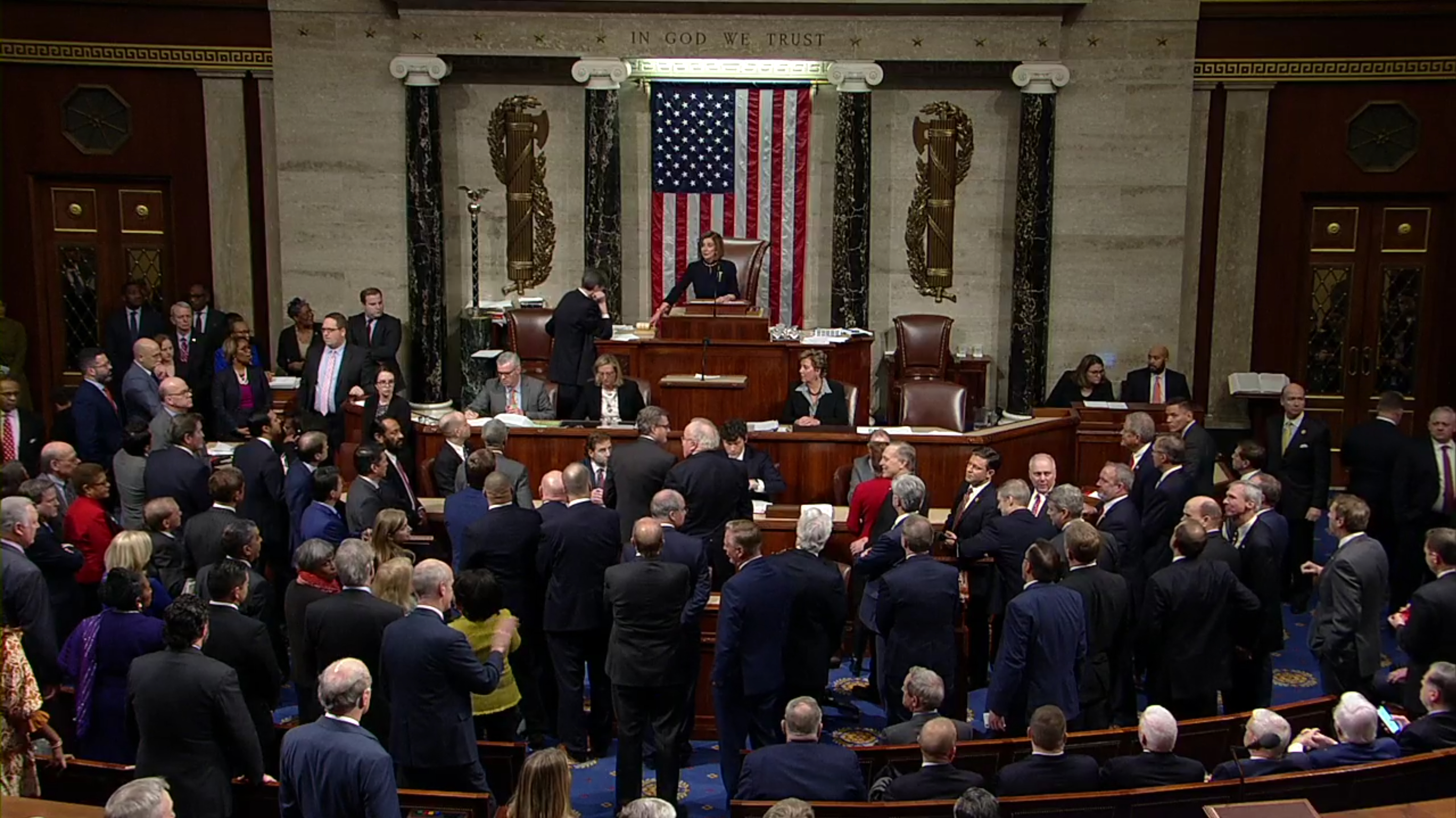
House of Representatives approved two articles of impeachment.

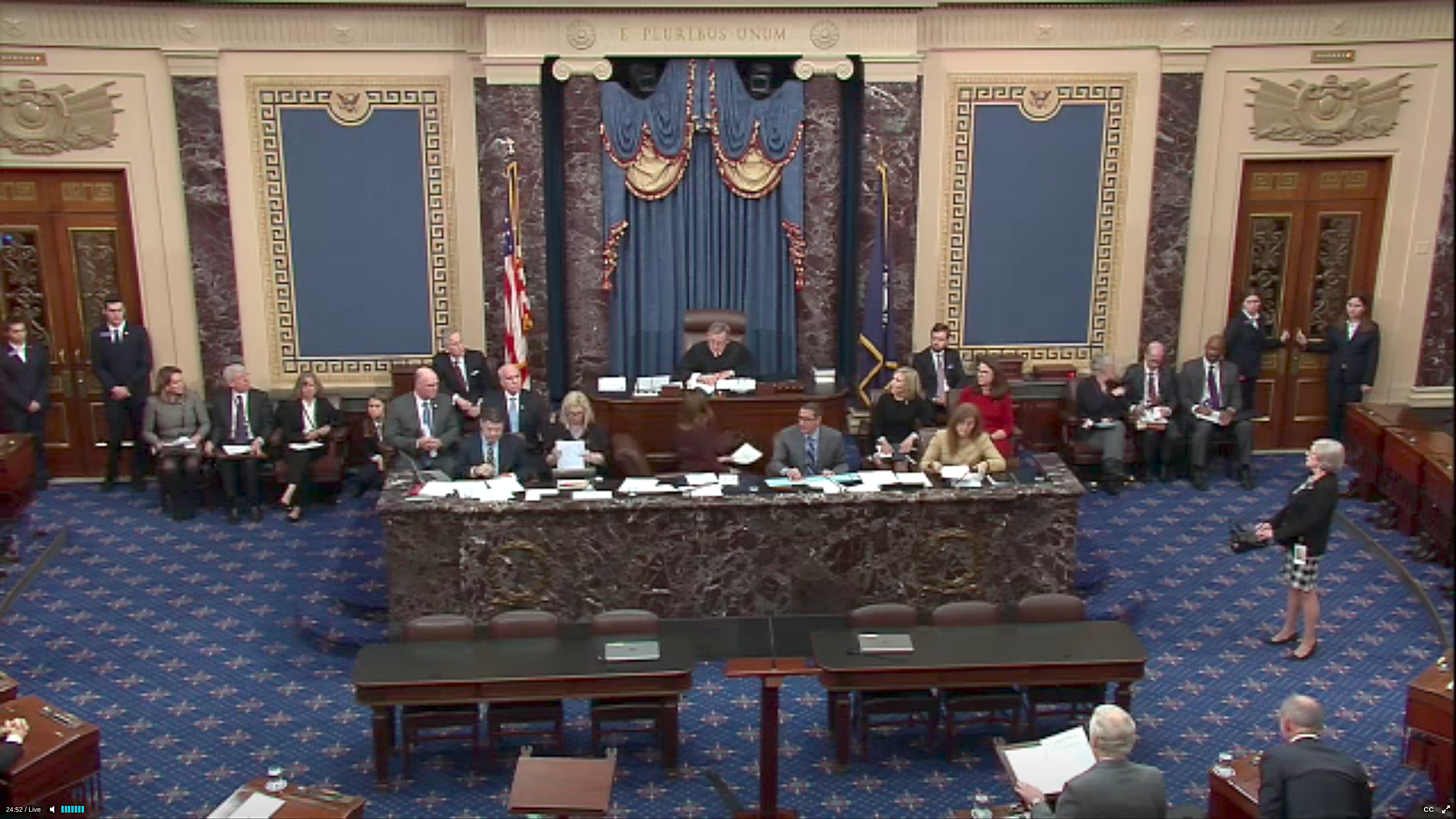
Chief Justice John Roberts presided over the Impeachment trial of Donald Trump

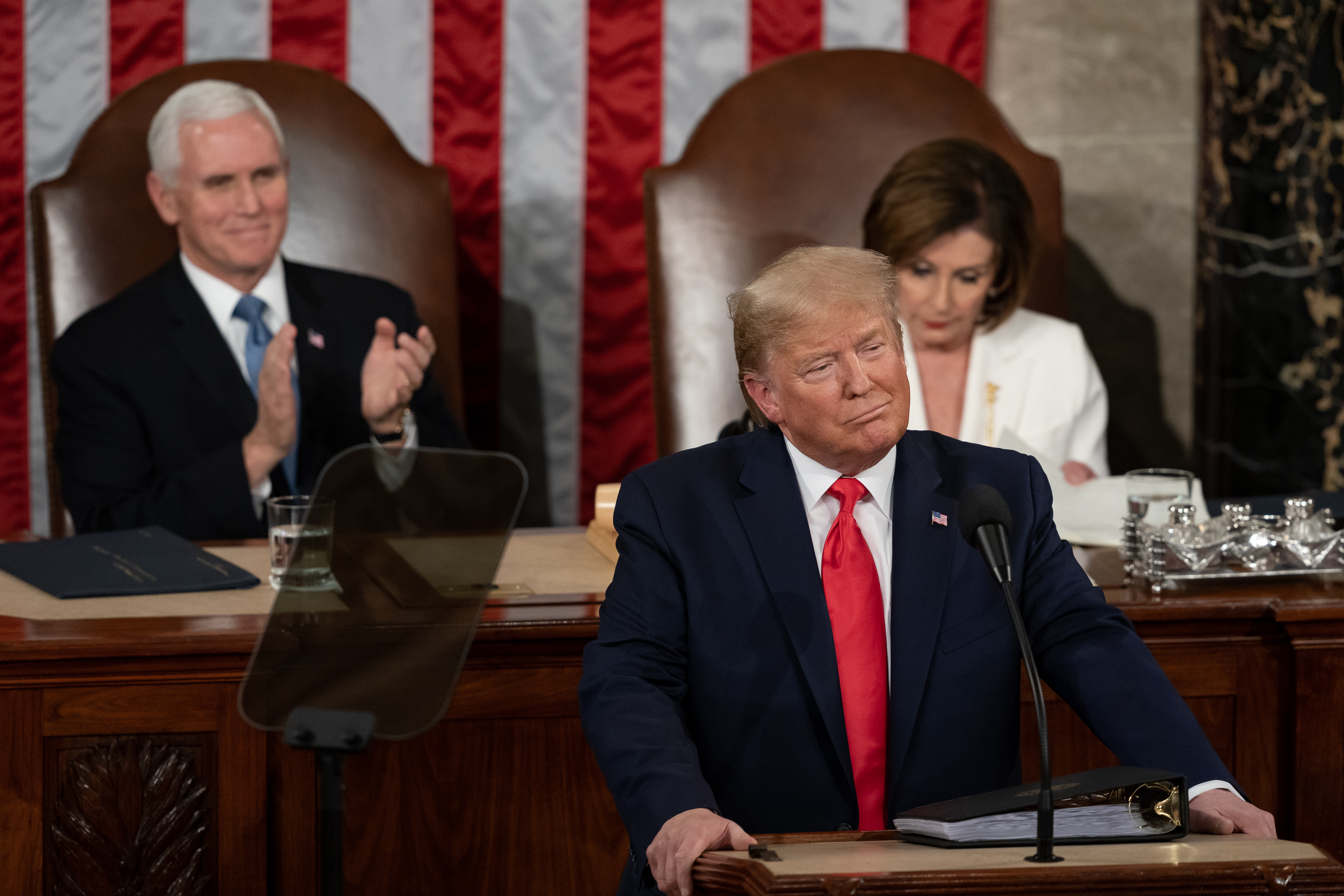
President Trump during his 2020 State of the Union Address, with Vice President Pence and House Speaker Pelosi.

- December 22, 2018 – January 25, 2019: 2018–2019 United States federal government shutdown
- January 3, 2019: Former Speaker and House Minority Leader Nancy Pelosi (D) was elected speaker again.
- February 5, 2019: President Donald Trump delivers the 2019 State of the Union Address. It was delayed from January 29 due to the partial government shutdown.
- February 15, 2019: President Trump declared a National Emergency Concerning the Southern Border of the United States.
- February 27, 2019: Former Trump lawyer Michael Cohen testified before the House Oversight and Reform Committee.
- March 24, 2019: Mueller special counsel investigation: U.S. Attorney General William Barr issued a summary letter of special counsel Robert Mueller's report to congress on the investigation into Russian interference in the 2016 presidential election.
- July 24, 2019: Mueller special counsel investigation: Special counsel Robert Mueller testified before the House Judiciary and Intelligence committees.
- September 24, 2019: First impeachment of Donald Trump: House opened an Impeachment inquiry against Donald Trump after a whistleblower alleged the President abused his power in a phone call with the President of Ukraine.
- December 13, 2019: First impeachment of Donald Trump: House Judiciary Committee approved two impeachment articles.
- December 18, 2019: First impeachment of Donald Trump: House impeached President Trump.
- January 16, 2020 – February 5, 2020: First impeachment of Donald Trump: Impeachment trial of Donald Trump
- February 4, 2020: President Trump delivers the 2020 State of the Union Address.
- March 11, 2020: Beginning of the COVID-19 pandemic in the United States
- May 26, 2020 – May 26, 2021: Nationwide George Floyd protests
- August 18, 2020 – April 6, 2022: 2020 United States Postal Service crisis
- September 30, 2020 – January 20, 2021: White House COVID-19 outbreak
- October 26, 2020: The Senate confirmed Amy Coney Barrett to the United States Supreme Court.
- November 3, 2020: 2020 United States elections were held. Joe Biden was elected the 46th President of the United States and Kamala Harris was elected the 49th Vice President of the United States, the first woman to be so elected. Democrats retained control of the United States House of Representatives, while Republicans briefly retained control of the Senate until January 20, 2021, because Democrats won both regular and special Senate elections in Georgia on January 5, 2021.

== Major legislation ==
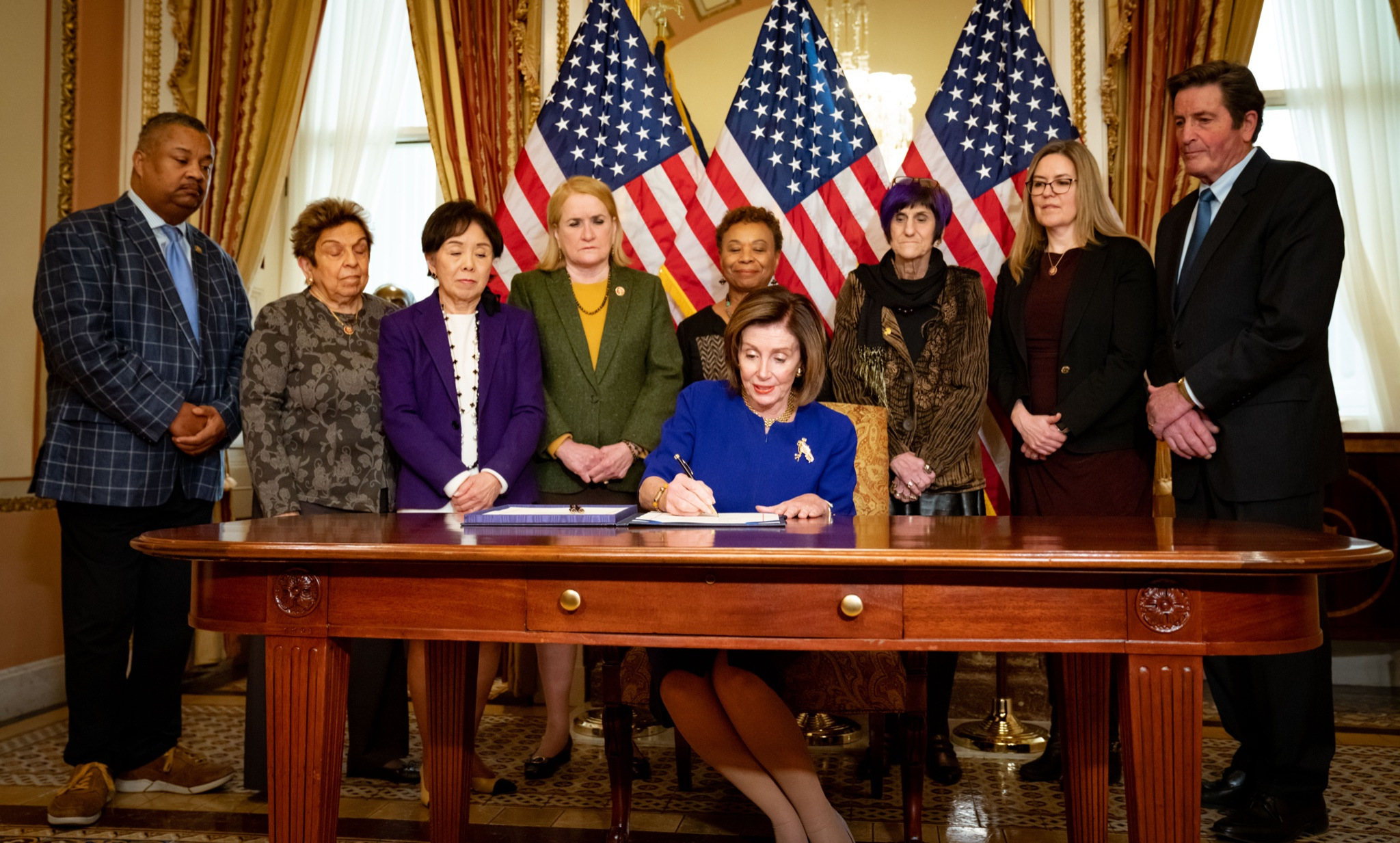
Speaker Nancy Pelosi signed the future Coronavirus Preparedness and Response Supplemental Appropriations Act.

Congressional Record: Volume 165 (2019)

=== Enacted ===
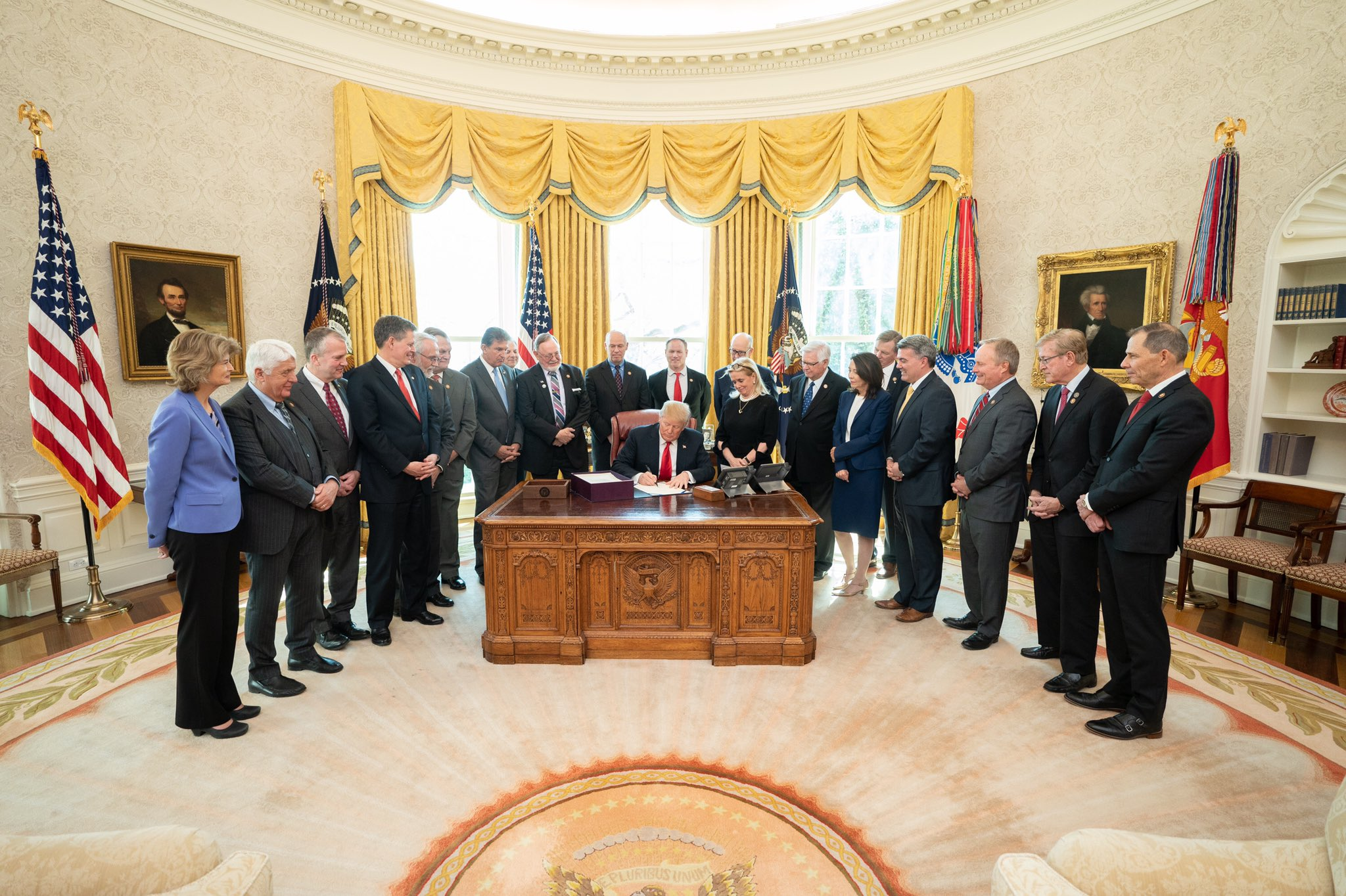
President Trump signing the Dingell Act, March 12, 2019

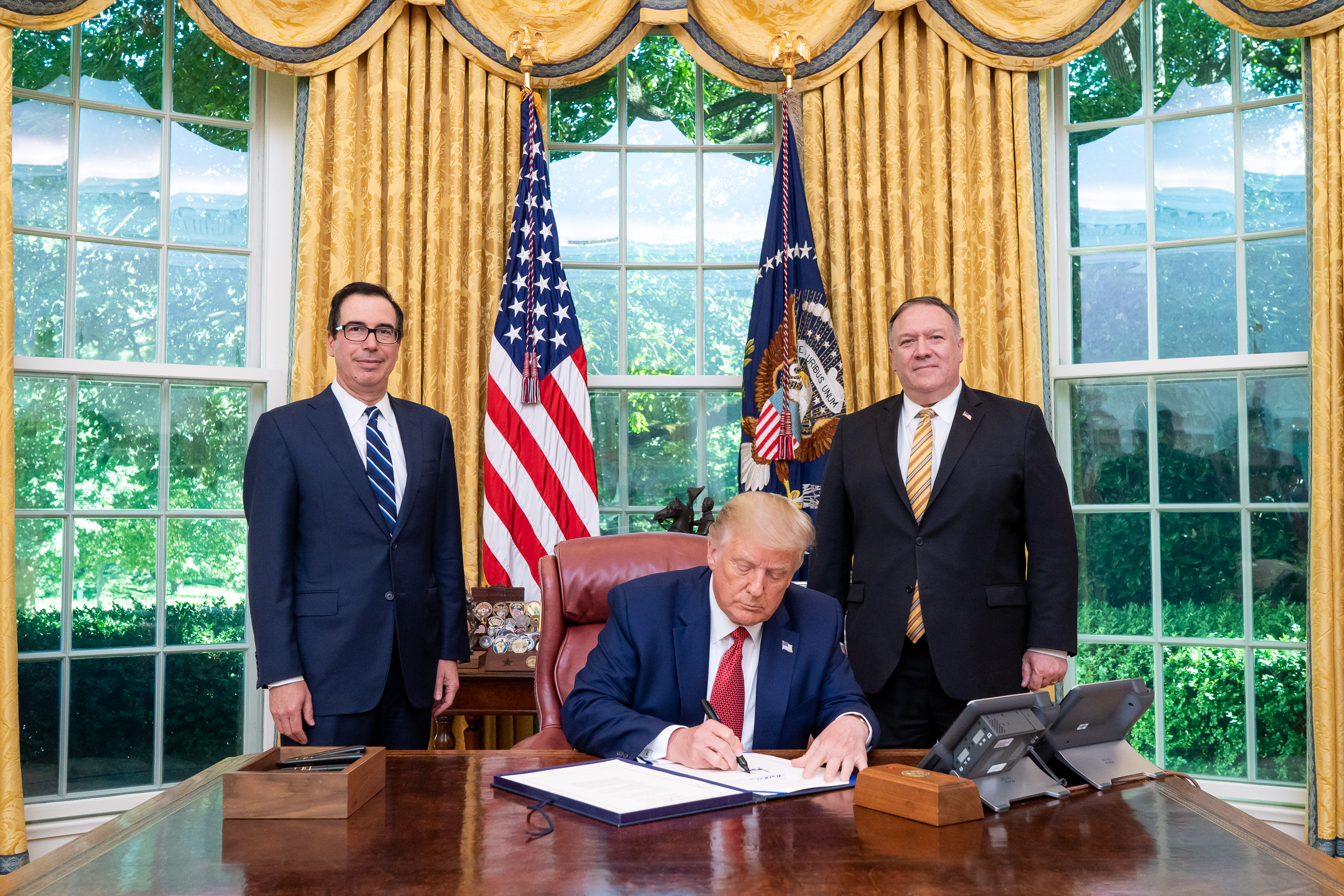
President Trump signing the Hong Kong Autonomy Act, together with Executive Order 13936, July 14, 2020

- January 16, 2019: Government Employee Fair Treatment Act, Pub.L. 116-1
- February 15, 2019: Consolidated Appropriations Act, 2019, Pub. L. 116–6 (text) (PDF), H.J.Res. 31
- March 12, 2019: John D. Dingell Jr. Conservation, Management, and Recreation Act, Pub. L. 116–9 (text) (PDF), S. 47
- June 24, 2019: Pandemic and All-Hazards Preparedness and Advancing Innovation Act, Pub.L. 116-22
- July 1, 2019: Taxpayer First Act of 2019, H.R. 3151
- July 29, 2019: Never Forget the Heroes: James Zadroga, Ray Pfeifer, and Luis Alvarez Permanent Authorization of the September 11th Victim Compensation Fund Act, Pub. L. 116–34 (text) (PDF), H.R. 1327
- November 27, 2019: Hong Kong Human Rights and Democracy Act, Pub. L. 116–76 (text) (PDF), S. 1838
- December 20, 2019: National Defense Authorization Act for Fiscal Year 2020, Pub. L. 116–92 (text) (PDF), S. 1790
- December 20, 2019: Setting Every Community Up for Retirement Enhancement (SECURE) Act as part of the Further Consolidated Appropriations Act, 2020, Pub. L. 116–94 (text) (PDF), S. 1865
- January 29, 2020: United States–Mexico–Canada Agreement Implementation Act, Pub. L. 116–113 (text) (PDF), H.R. 5430
- March 2, 2020: Payment Integrity Information Act of 2019, Pub. L. 116–117 (text) (PDF), S375
- Coronavirus relief acts:
  - March 6, 2020: Coronavirus Preparedness and Response Supplemental Appropriations Act, 2020, Pub. L. 116–123 (text) (PDF), H.R. 6074
  - March 18, 2020: Families First Coronavirus Response Act, Pub. L. 116–127 (text) (PDF), H.R. 6201
  - March 27, 2020: Coronavirus Aid, Relief, and Economic Security Act (CARES Act), Pub. L. 116–136 (text) (PDF), H.R. 748
  - April 24, 2020: Paycheck Protection Program and Health Care Enhancement Act, Pub. L. 116–139 (text) (PDF), H.R. 266
  - December 27, 2020: Consolidated Appropriations Act, 2021, H.R. 133
- March 26, 2020: Taiwan Allies International Protection and Enhancement Initiative Act, Pub. L. 116–135 (text) (PDF), S. 1678
- June 17, 2020: Uyghur Human Rights Policy Act, Pub. L. 116–145 (text) (PDF), S. 3744
- July 14, 2020: Hong Kong Autonomy Act, Pub. L. 116–149 (text) (PDF), H.R. 7440
- August 4, 2020: Great American Outdoors Act, Pub. L. 116–152 (text) (PDF), S. 1957
- October 10, 2020: Savanna's Act, Pub.L. 116-165
- January 1, 2021: William M. (Mac) Thornberry National Defense Authorization Act for Fiscal Year 2021, Pub. L. 116–217 (text) (PDF), H.R. 6395 (passed over veto)
- January 13, 2021: Malala Yousafzai Scholarship Act, Pub.L. 116-338

=== Proposed (but not enacted) ===
- House Bills
  - H.R. 1: For the People Act of 2019
  - H.R. 2 Moving Forward Act
  - H.R. 3: Elijah Cummings Lower Drug Costs Now Act of 2019
  - H.R. 4: John Lewis Voting Rights Act of 2019
  - H.R. 5: Equality Act of 2019
  - H.R. 6: American Dream and Promise Act of 2019
  - H.R. 7: Paycheck Fairness Act of 2019
  - H.R. 8: Bipartisan Background Checks Act of 2019
  - H.R. 51: DC Admission Act of 2019
  - H.R. 1595: SAFE Banking Act of 2019
  - H.R. 3884: Marijuana Opportunity Reinvestment and Expungement Act of 2019
  - H.R. 6800: HEROES Act of 2019
  - H.R. 7085: Ending Qualified Immunity Act of 2019
  - H.R. 7120: George Floyd Justice in Policing Act of 2020
- Senate Bills
- House Joint Resolutions
  - H.J.Res. 77: "Opposing the decision to end certain United States efforts to prevent Turkish military operations against Syrian Kurdish forces in Northeast Syria"
  - H.J.Res. 79: "Removing the deadline for the ratification of the equal rights amendment"
- Passed, but vetoed
  - March 15, 2019: H.J.Res. 46: Relating to a national emergency declared by the President on February 15, 2019. (Vetoed)
  - April 16, 2019: S.J.Res. 7: A joint resolution to direct the removal of United States Armed Forces from hostilities in the Republic of Yemen that have not been authorized by Congress. (Vetoed)

== Major resolutions ==
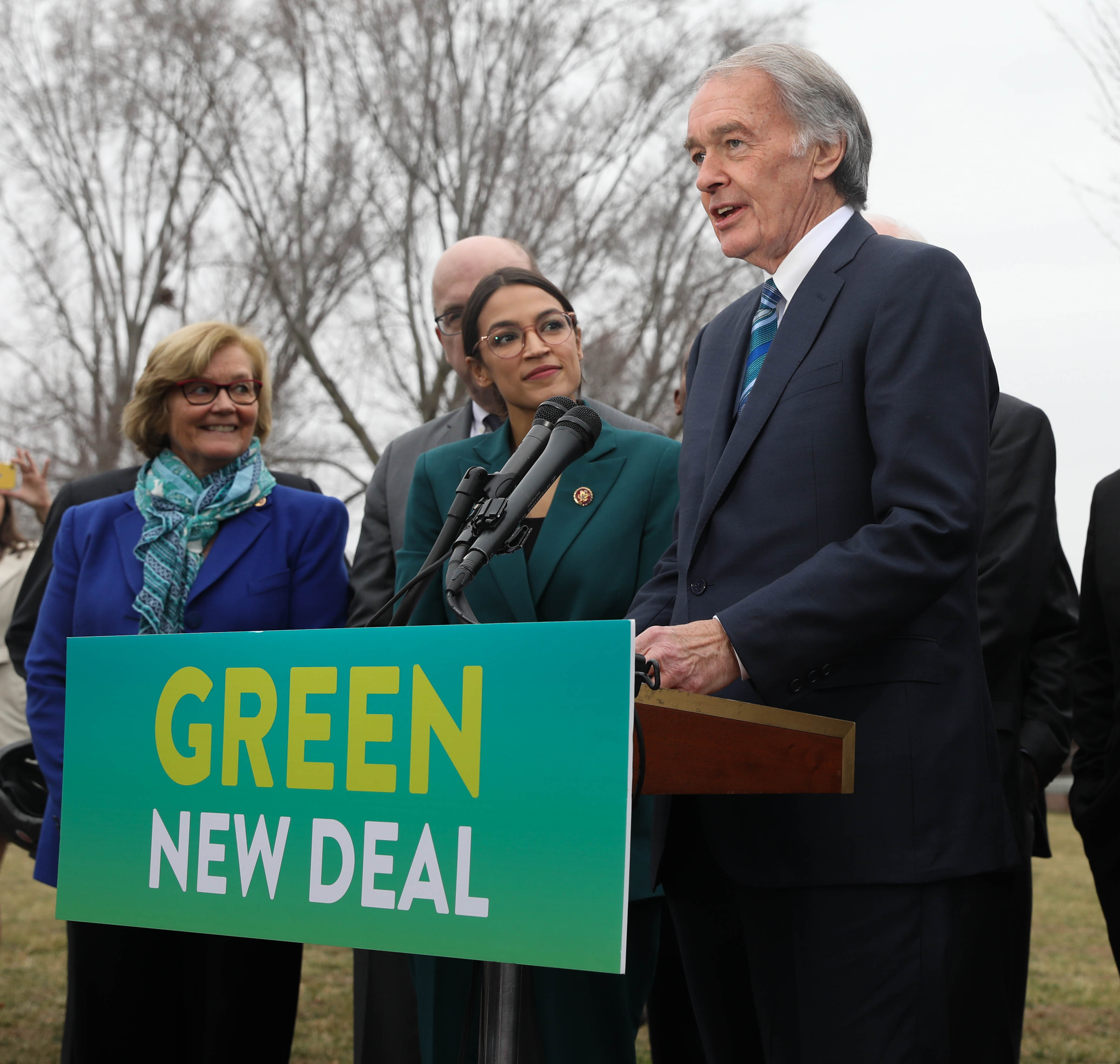
The Green New Deal, championed by Democrats upon their new House majority, was proposed by Senator Ed Markey (speaking) and Representative Alexandria Ocasio-Cortez (next to him), February 7, 2019

=== Adopted ===
- October 31, 2019: Formally commencing an impeachment inquiry against Donald Trump, H.Res. 660
- December 18, 2019: "Impeaching Donald John Trump, President of the United States, for high crimes and misdemeanors", H.Res. 755

=== Proposed ===
- H.Res. 109: "Recognizing the duty of the Federal Government to create a Green New Deal"

== Party summary ==
Resignations and new members are discussed in the "Changes in membership" section below.

=== Senate ===
Senate membership

Final (from December 2, 2020)

Begin (January 3, 2019) – January 8, 2019

January 8, 2019 – December 31, 2019

December 31, 2019 – January 6, 2020

January 6, 2020 – December 2, 2020

Affiliation	Party (shading indicates majority caucus)			Total	Vacant
Affiliation	Democratic	Independent (caucusing with Democrats)	Republican	Total	Vacant
End of previous Congress	47	2	50	99	1
Begin (January 3, 2019)	45	2	52	99	1
January 8, 2019 (Note: In Florida: Rick Scott (R) took office on January 8, 2019, after finishing his term as Governor of Florida.)	45	2	53	100	0
December 31, 2019 (Note: In Georgia: Johnny Isakson (R) resigned December 31, 2019; Kelly Loeffler (R) was appointed January 6, 2020, to continue the term.)	45	2	52	99	1
January 6, 2020	45	2	53	100	0
December 2, 2020 (Note: In Arizona: Mark Kelly (D) replaced interim appointee Martha McSally (R) in a special election.)	46	2	52	100	0
Final voting share	48.0%		52.0%		
Beginning of the next Congress	46	2	51	99	1

=== House of Representatives ===
House membership

Final (from December 14, 2020)

Begin (January 3, 2019) – January 23, 2019

January 23, 2019 – February 10, 2019

February 10, 2019 – May 21, 2019

May 21, 2019 – July 4, 2019

July 4, 2019 – September 10, 2019

September 10, 2019 – September 23, 2019

September 23, 2019 – October 1, 2019

October 1, 2019 – October 17, 2019

October 17, 2019 – November 3, 2019

November 3, 2019 – December 19, 2019

December 19, 2019 – January 13, 2020

January 13, 2020 – March 30, 2020

March 30, 2020 – April 29, 2020

April 29, 2020 – May 1, 2020

May 1, 2020 – May 12, 2020

May 12, 2020 - May 22, 2020

May 22, 2020 – June 23, 2020

June 23, 2020 – July 17, 2020

July 17, 2020 – October 4, 2020

October 4, 2020 – December 1, 2020

December 1, 2020 – December 7, 2020

December 1, 2020 – December 14, 2020

Affiliation	Party (shading indicates majority caucus)				Total	Vacant
Affiliation	Democratic	Independent	Libertarian	Republican	Total	Vacant
End of previous Congress	196	0	0	236	432	3
Begin (January 3, 2019) (Note: In North Carolina's 9th district: the November 2018 election results were not certified due to a dispute over voting irregularities. Dan Bishop (R) was elected September 10, 2019.)	235	0	0	199	434	1
January 23, 2019 (Note: In Pennsylvania's 12th district: Tom Marino (R) resigned January 23, 2019, and Fred Keller (R) was elected May 21, 2019.)	235	0	0	198	433	2
February 10, 2019 (Note: In North Carolina's 3rd district: Walter Jones (R) died February 10, 2019, and Greg Murphy (R) was elected September 10, 2019.)	235	0	0	197	432	3
May 21, 2019	235	0	0	198	433	2
July 4, 2019 (Note: In Michigan's 3rd district: Justin Amash changed parties from Republican to Independent July 4, 2019, then changed to Libertarian May 1, 2020.)	235	1	0	197	433	2
September 10, 2019	235	1	0	199	435	0
September 23, 2019 (Note: In Wisconsin's 7th district: Sean Duffy (R) resigned September 23, 2019, and Tom Tiffany (R) was elected May 12, 2020.)	235	1	0	198	434	1
October 1, 2019 (Note: In New York's 27th district: Chris Collins (R) resigned October 1, 2019, and Chris Jacobs (R) was elected June 23, 2020.)	235	1	0	197	433	2
October 17, 2019 (Note: In Maryland's 7th district: Elijah Cummings (D) died October 17, 2019, and Kweisi Mfume (D) was elected April 29, 2020.)	234	1	0	197	432	3
November 3, 2019 (Note: In California's 25th district: Katie Hill (D) resigned November 3, 2019, and Mike Garcia (R) was elected May 12, 2020.)	233	1	0	197	431	4
December 19, 2019 (Note: In New Jersey's 2nd district: Jeff Van Drew changed parties from Democratic to Republican December 19, 2019.)	232	1	0	198	431	4
January 13, 2020 (Note: In California's 50th district: Duncan D. Hunter (R) resigned January 13, 2020.)	232	1	0	197	430	5
March 30, 2020 (Note: In North Carolina's 11th district: Mark Meadows (R) resigned March 30, 2020.)	232	1	0	196	429	6
April 29, 2020	233	1	0	196	430	5
May 1, 2020	233	0	1	196	430	5
May 12, 2020	233	0	1	198	432	3
May 22, 2020 (Note: In Texas's 4th district: John Ratcliffe (R) resigned May 22, 2020.)	233	0	1	197	431	4
June 23, 2020	233	0	1	198	432	3
July 17, 2020 (Note: In Georgia's 5th district: John Lewis (D) died July 17, 2020, and Kwanza Hall (D) was elected December 1, 2020.)	232	0	1	198	431	4
October 4, 2020 (Note: In Georgia's 14th district: Tom Graves (R) resigned October 4, 2020.)	232	0	1	197	430	5
December 1, 2020	233	0	1	197	431	4
December 7, 2020 (Note: In California's 8th district: Paul Cook (R) resigned December 7, 2020.)	233	0	1	196	430	5
December 14, 2020 (Note: In Michigan's 10th district: Paul Mitchell changed from Republican to Independent.)	233	1	1	195	430	5
Final voting share	54.2%	0.2%	0.2%	45.3%		
Non-voting members	3	1	0	2	6	0
Beginning of the next Congress	222	0	0	211	433	2

== Leadership ==
=== Senate ===
Senate President

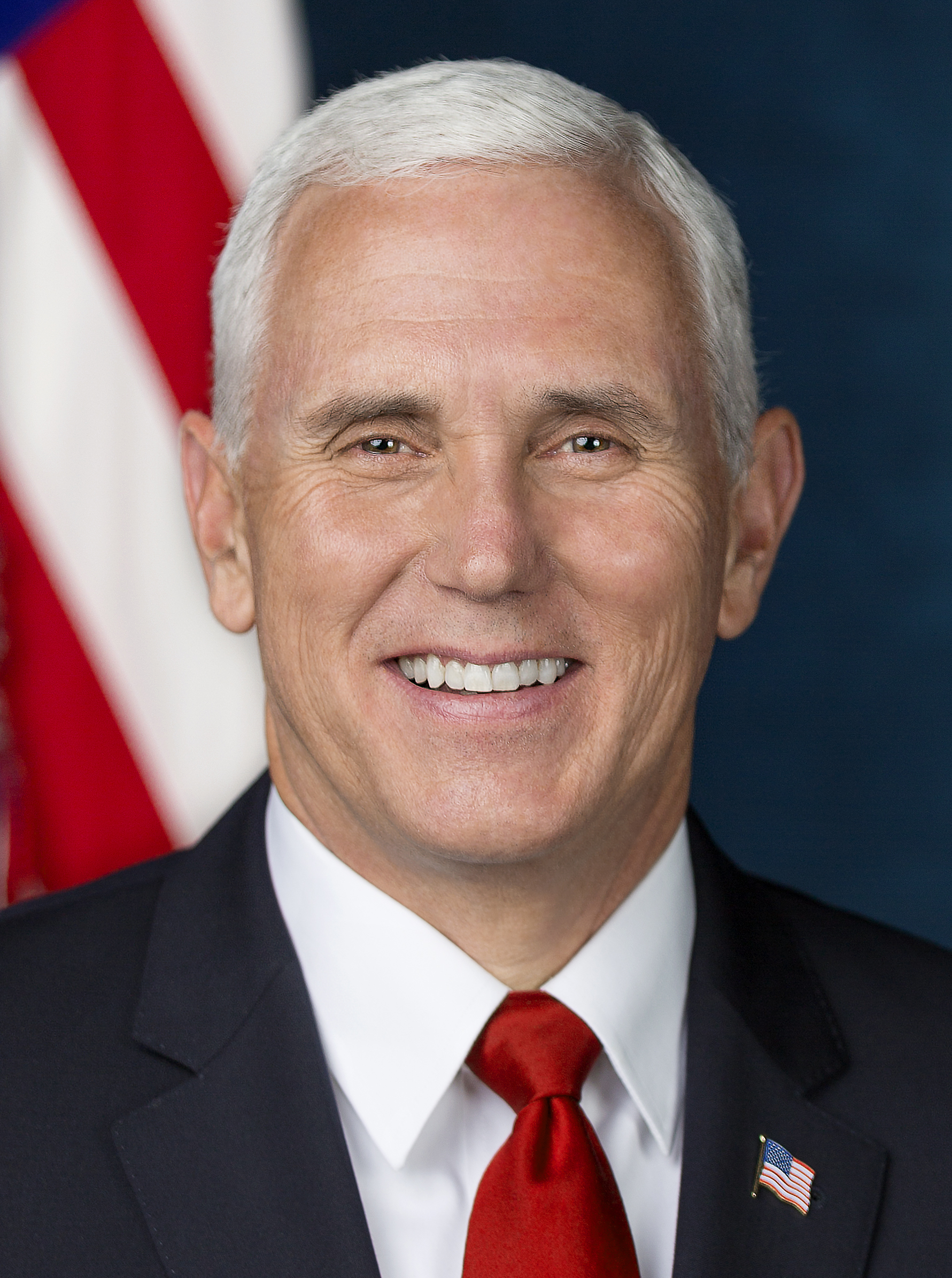
Mike Pence (R)

Senate President pro tempore

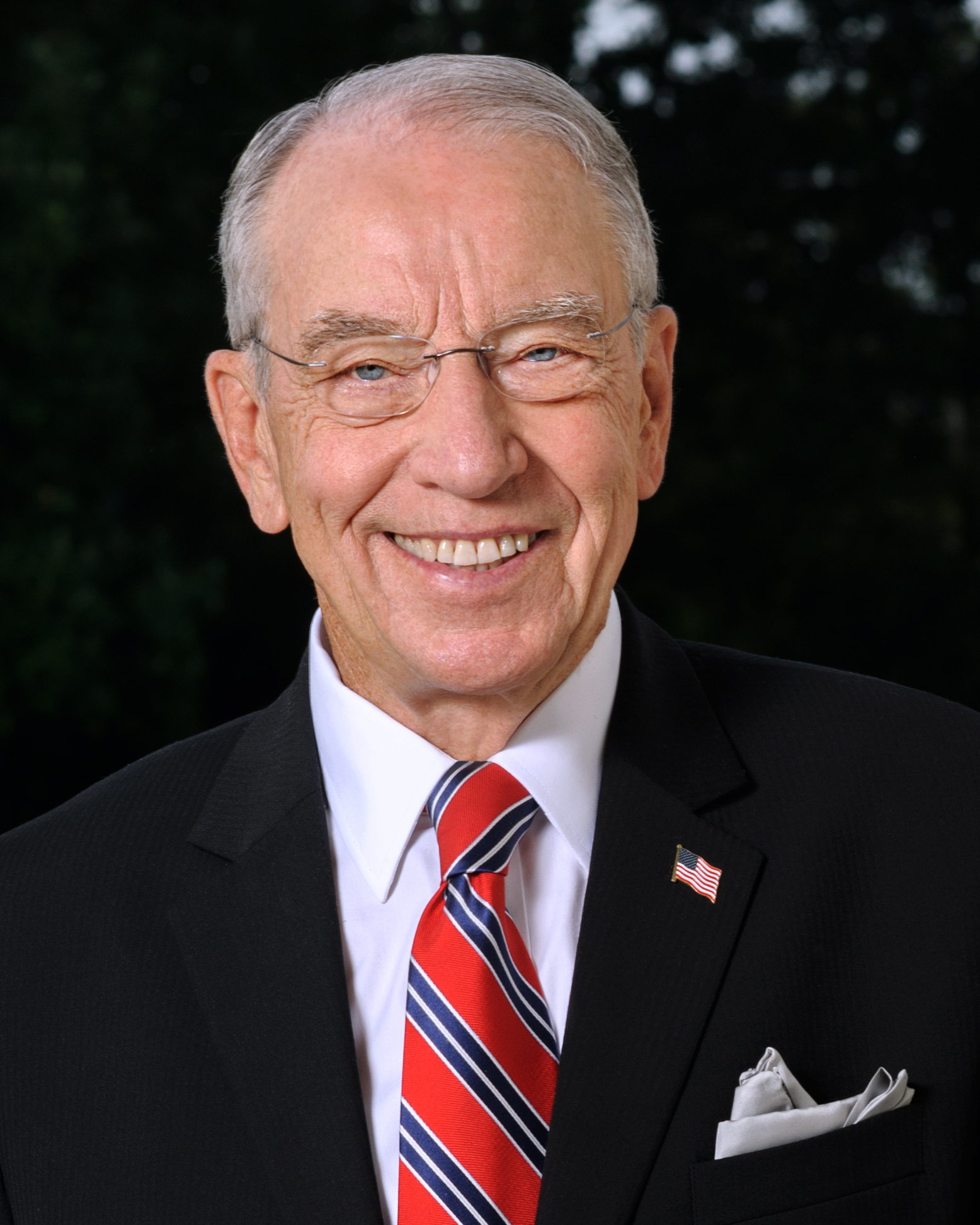
Chuck Grassley (R)

==== Presiding ====
- President of the Senate: Mike Pence (R)
- President pro tempore: Chuck Grassley (R)

==== Majority (Republican) leadership ====
- Senate Majority Leader: Mitch McConnell
- Senate Majority Whip: John Thune
- Chair of the Senate Republican Conference: John Barrasso
- Chair of the Senate Republican Policy Committee: Roy Blunt
- Vice Chair of the Senate Republican Conference: Joni Ernst
- Chair of the National Republican Senatorial Committee: Todd Young
- Chair of the Senate Republican Steering Committee: Mike Lee
- Senate Republican Chief Deputy Whip: Mike Crapo
- Senate Republican Deputy Whips: Roy Blunt, Shelley Moore Capito, John Cornyn, Cory Gardner, James Lankford, Martha McSally, Rob Portman, Mitt Romney, Tim Scott, Thom Tillis, and Todd Young

==== Minority (Democratic) leadership ====
- Senate Minority Leader and Chair of the Senate Democratic Caucus: Chuck Schumer
- Senate Minority Whip: Dick Durbin
- Senate Assistant Democratic Leader: Patty Murray
- Chair of the Senate Democratic Policy and Communications Committee: Debbie Stabenow
- Vice Chairs of the Senate Democratic Caucus: Mark Warner and Elizabeth Warren
- Chair of the Senate Democratic Steering Committee: Amy Klobuchar
- Chair of Senate Democratic Outreach: Bernie Sanders
- Vice Chair of the Senate Democratic Policy and Communications Committee: Joe Manchin
- Secretary of the Senate Democratic Caucus: Tammy Baldwin
- Chair of the Democratic Senatorial Campaign Committee: Catherine Cortez Masto
- Senate Democratic Chief Deputy Whips: Cory Booker, Jeff Merkley, and Brian Schatz

=== House of Representatives ===
House Speaker

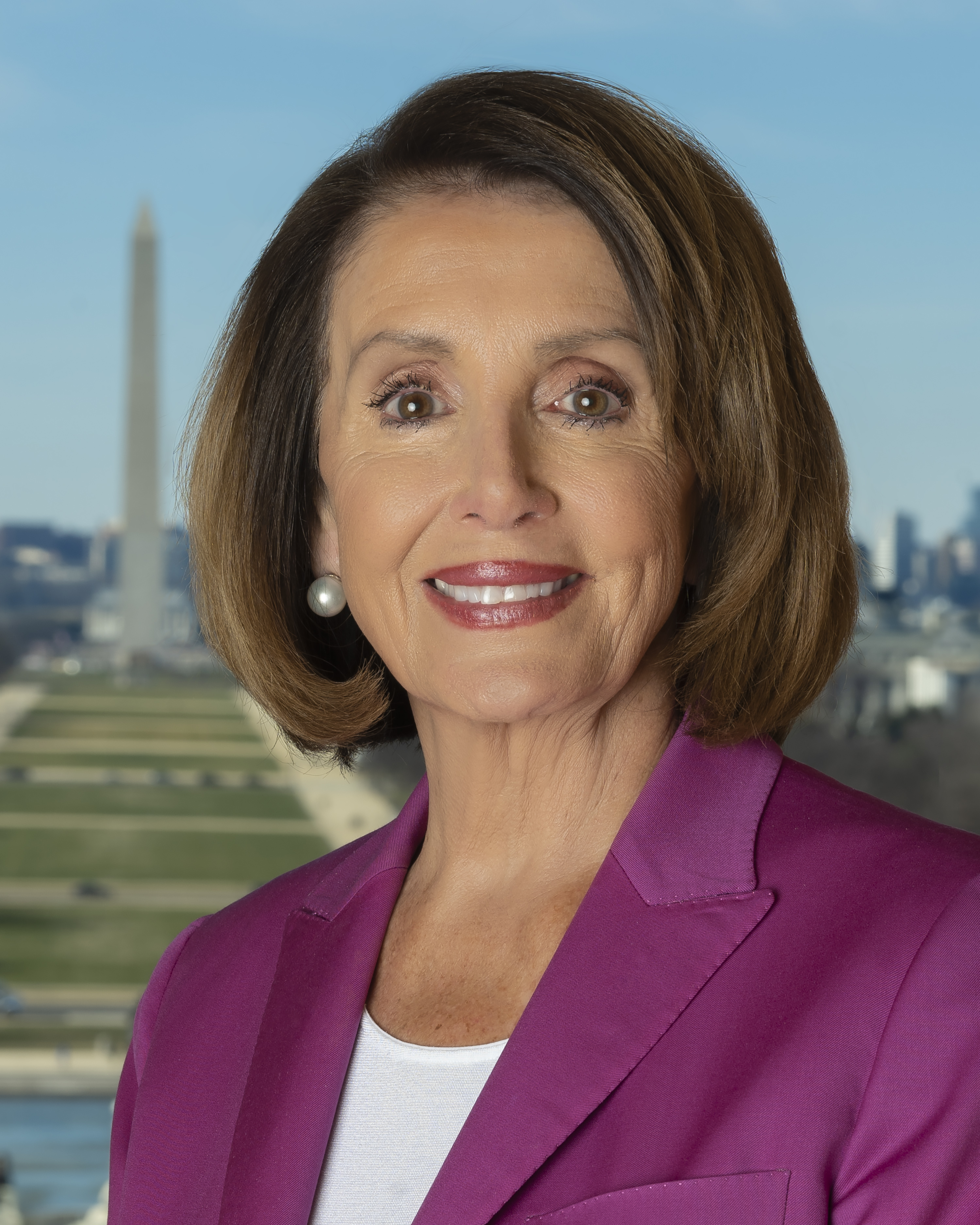
Nancy Pelosi (D)

==== Presiding ====
- Speaker of the House: Nancy Pelosi (D)

==== Majority (Democratic) leadership ====
- House Majority Leader: Steny Hoyer
- House Majority Whip: Jim Clyburn
- Assistant Speaker of the House: Ben Ray Luján
- Chair of the House Democratic Caucus: Hakeem Jeffries
- Vice Chair of the House Democratic Caucus: Katherine Clark
- Chair of the Democratic Congressional Campaign Committee: Cheri Bustos
- Chair of the House Democratic Policy and Communications Committee: David Cicilline
- Co-Chairs of the House Democratic Policy and Communications Committee: Matt Cartwright, Debbie Dingell, and Ted Lieu
- House Democratic Junior Caucus Leadership Representative: Jamie Raskin
- House Democratic Freshman Class Leadership Representatives: Katie Hill (until November 3, 2019), Veronica Escobar (from November 13, 2019), and Joe Neguse
- Co-Chairs of the House Democratic Steering and Policy Committee: Rosa DeLauro, Barbara Lee, and Eric Swalwell
- House Democratic Assistant to the Majority Whip: Cedric Richmond
- House Democratic Senior Chief Deputy Whips: John Lewis (until July 17, 2020) and Jan Schakowsky
- House Democratic Chief Deputy Whips: Pete Aguilar, G. K. Butterfield, Henry Cuellar, Dan Kildee, Sheila Jackson Lee, Debbie Wasserman Schultz, Terri Sewell, and Peter Welch

==== Minority (Republican) leadership ====
- House Minority Leader and Chair of the House Republican Steering Committee: Kevin McCarthy
- House Minority Whip: Steve Scalise
- Chair of the House Republican Conference: Liz Cheney
- Vice Chair of the House Republican Conference: Mark Walker
- Secretary of the House Republican Conference: Jason Smith
- Chair of the House Republican Policy Committee: Gary Palmer
- Chair of the National Republican Congressional Committee: Tom Emmer
- House Republican Chief Deputy Whip: Drew Ferguson

== Demographics ==
Most members of this Congress were Christian (88.2%), with approximately half being Protestant and 30.5% being Catholic. Jewish membership is 6.4%. Other religions represented included Buddhism, Islam, and Hinduism. One senator said that she was religiously unaffiliated, while the number of members refusing to specify their religious affiliation increased.

Roughly 96% of members held college degrees. All but 128 members were non-Hispanic white, and all but 131 members were men.

=== Senate ===
The Senate included 74 men and 26 women, the most women to date. In 6 states, both senators were women; 14 states were represented by one man and one woman; and 30 states were represented by two men. During this Congress, Johnny Isakson retired for health reasons and Kelly Loeffler was appointed, which increased the number of women from 25 after the 2018 elections to 26. There were 91 non-Hispanic white, 4 Hispanic, 2 black, 2 Asian, and 1 multiracial (black/Asian) senators. Additionally, 2 senators were LGBTQ+. The average age of Senators at the beginning of this Congress was 62.9 years.

=== House of Representatives ===
There were 101 women in the House, the largest number in history. There were 313 non-Hispanic white, 56 black, 44 Hispanic, 15 Asian, and 4 Native American congressmembers. Eight were LGBTQ+. Two Democrats — Alexandria Ocasio-Cortez and Donna Shalala — were the youngest (29) and oldest (77) freshmen women in history. Freshmen Rashida Tlaib (D-MI) and Ilhan Omar (DFL-MN) were the first two Muslim women and freshmen Sharice Davids (D-KS) and Deb Haaland (D-NM) were the first two Native American women elected as well. The average age of Members of the House at the beginning of the 116th Congress was 57.6 years.

With the election of Carolyn Maloney as the first woman to chair the House Oversight Committee, women chaired a record six House committees in a single Congress (out of 26 women ever to chair House committees in the history of Congress), including House members Maxine Waters (Financial Services), Nita Lowey (Appropriations), Zoe Lofgren (Administration), Eddie Bernice Johnson (Science, Space and Technology) and Nydia Velázquez (Small Business), as well as Kathy Castor, who chaired the Select Committee on the Climate Crisis. In addition, women chaired a record 39 House subcommittees. Lowey and Kay Granger were also the first women to serve as chair and ranking member of the same committee in the same Congress since the since-defunct Select Committee on the House Beauty Shop, which was chaired and populated entirely by congresswomen during its existence from 1967 to 1977.

=== Diversity of the freshman class ===
The demographics of the 116th U.S. Congress freshmen were more diverse than any previous incoming class.

At least 25 new congressional representatives were Hispanic, Native American, or people of color, and the incoming class included the first Native American women, the first Muslim women, and the two youngest women ever elected. The 116th Congress included more women elected to the House than did any previous Congress.

== Members ==
=== Senate ===
The numbers refer to their Senate classes. All class 1 seats were contested in the November 2018 elections. In this Congress, class 1 means their term commenced in the current Congress, requiring re-election in 2024; class 2 means their term ends with this Congress, requiring re-election in 2020; and class 3 means their term began in the last Congress, requiring re-election in 2022.

==== Alabama ====
▌2. Doug Jones (D)
▌3. Richard Shelby (R)

==== Alaska ====
▌2. Dan Sullivan (R)
▌3. Lisa Murkowski (R)

==== Arizona ====
▌1. Kyrsten Sinema (D)
▌3. Martha McSally (R) (until December 2, 2020)

▌Mark Kelly (D) (from December 2, 2020)

==== Arkansas ====
▌2. Tom Cotton (R)
▌3. John Boozman (R)

==== California ====
▌1. Dianne Feinstein (D)
▌3. Kamala Harris (D)

==== Colorado ====
▌2. Cory Gardner (R)
▌3. Michael Bennet (D)

==== Connecticut ====
▌1. Chris Murphy (D)
▌3. Richard Blumenthal (D)

==== Delaware ====
▌1. Tom Carper (D)
▌2. Chris Coons (D)

==== Florida ====
▌1. Rick Scott (R) (from January 8, 2019)
▌3. Marco Rubio (R)

==== Georgia ====
▌2. David Perdue (R)
▌3. Johnny Isakson (R) (until December 31, 2019)

▌Kelly Loeffler (R) (from January 6, 2020) (Note: Loeffler's appointment was "effective December 31, 2019.")

==== Hawaii ====
▌1. Mazie Hirono (D)
▌3. Brian Schatz (D)

==== Idaho ====
▌2. Jim Risch (R)
▌3. Mike Crapo (R)

==== Illinois ====
▌2. Dick Durbin (D)
▌3. Tammy Duckworth (D)

==== Indiana ====
▌1. Mike Braun (R)
▌3. Todd Young (R)

==== Iowa ====
▌2. Joni Ernst (R)
▌3. Chuck Grassley (R)

==== Kansas ====
▌2. Pat Roberts (R)
▌3. Jerry Moran (R)

==== Kentucky ====
▌2. Mitch McConnell (R)
▌3. Rand Paul (R)

==== Louisiana ====
▌2. Bill Cassidy (R)
▌3. John Kennedy (R)

==== Maine ====
▌1. Angus King (I)
▌2. Susan Collins (R)

==== Maryland ====
▌1. Ben Cardin (D)
▌3. Chris Van Hollen (D)

==== Massachusetts ====
▌1. Elizabeth Warren (D)
▌2. Ed Markey (D)

==== Michigan ====
▌1. Debbie Stabenow (D)
▌2. Gary Peters (D)

==== Minnesota ====
▌1. Amy Klobuchar (DFL) (Note: The Minnesota Democratic–Farmer–Labor Party (DFL) is the Minnesota affiliate of the U.S. Democratic Party and its members are counted as Democrats.)
▌2. Tina Smith (DFL)

==== Mississippi ====
▌1. Roger Wicker (R)
▌2. Cindy Hyde-Smith (R)

==== Missouri ====
▌1. Josh Hawley (R)
▌3. Roy Blunt (R)

==== Montana ====
▌1. Jon Tester (D)
▌2. Steve Daines (R)

==== Nebraska ====
▌1. Deb Fischer (R)
▌2. Ben Sasse (R)

==== Nevada ====
▌1. Jacky Rosen (D)
▌3. Catherine Cortez Masto (D)

==== New Hampshire ====
▌2. Jeanne Shaheen (D)
▌3. Maggie Hassan (D)

==== New Jersey ====
▌1. Bob Menendez (D)
▌2. Cory Booker (D)

==== New Mexico ====
▌1. Martin Heinrich (D)
▌2. Tom Udall (D)

==== New York ====
▌1. Kirsten Gillibrand (D)
▌3. Chuck Schumer (D)

==== North Carolina ====
▌2. Thom Tillis (R)
▌3. Richard Burr (R)

==== North Dakota ====
▌1. Kevin Cramer (R)
▌3. John Hoeven (R)

==== Ohio ====
▌1. Sherrod Brown (D)
▌3. Rob Portman (R)

==== Oklahoma ====
▌2. Jim Inhofe (R)
▌3. James Lankford (R)

==== Oregon ====
▌2. Jeff Merkley (D)
▌3. Ron Wyden (D)

==== Pennsylvania ====
▌1. Bob Casey Jr. (D)
▌3. Pat Toomey (R)

==== Rhode Island ====
▌1. Sheldon Whitehouse (D)
▌2. Jack Reed (D)

==== South Carolina ====
▌2. Lindsey Graham (R)
▌3. Tim Scott (R)

==== South Dakota ====
▌2. Mike Rounds (R)
▌3. John Thune (R)

==== Tennessee ====
▌1. Marsha Blackburn (R)
▌2. Lamar Alexander (R)

==== Texas ====
▌1. Ted Cruz (R)
▌2. John Cornyn (R)

==== Utah ====
▌1. Mitt Romney (R)
▌3. Mike Lee (R)

==== Vermont ====
▌1. Bernie Sanders (I) (Note: Although Sanders ran for U.S. President in the Democratic primary and claimed to be a "bona fide Democrat" in accordance to DNC rules, he is officially an independent senator who caucuses with the Democrats.)
▌3. Patrick Leahy (D)

==== Virginia ====
▌1. Tim Kaine (D)
▌2. Mark Warner (D)

==== Washington ====
▌1. Maria Cantwell (D)
▌3. Patty Murray (D)

==== West Virginia ====
▌1. Joe Manchin (D)
▌2. Shelley Moore Capito (R)

==== Wisconsin ====
▌1. Tammy Baldwin (D)
▌3. Ron Johnson (R)

==== Wyoming ====
▌1. John Barrasso (R)
▌2. Mike Enzi (R)

Senate composition by state 2 Democrats (18 states) 1 Independent and 1 Democrat (1 state) 1 Democrat and 1 Republican (8 states) 1 Independent and 1 Republican (1 state) 2 Republicans (22 states)

Senate majority leadership

Republican leader
Mitch McConnell

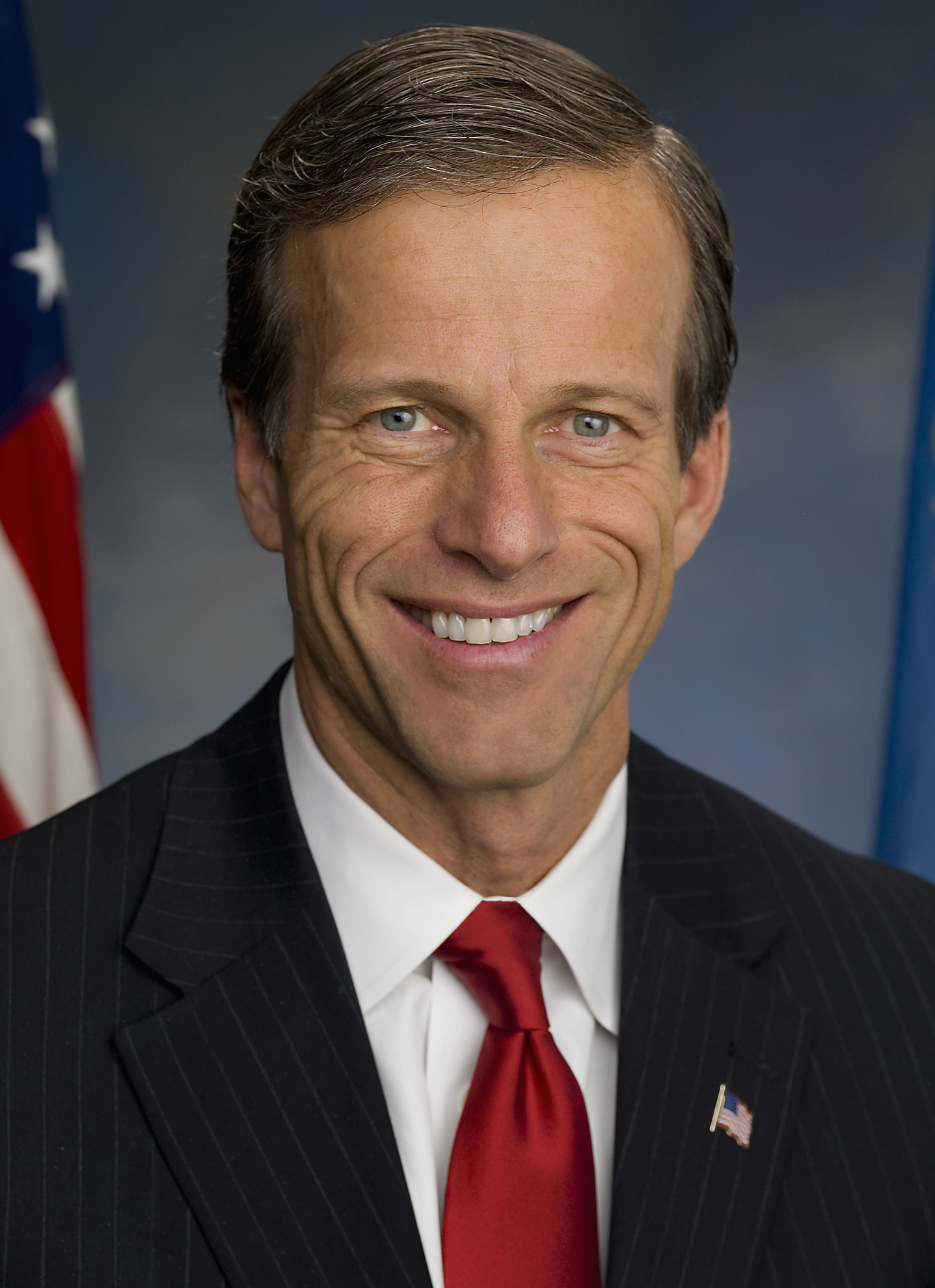
Republican whip
John Thune

Senate minority leadership

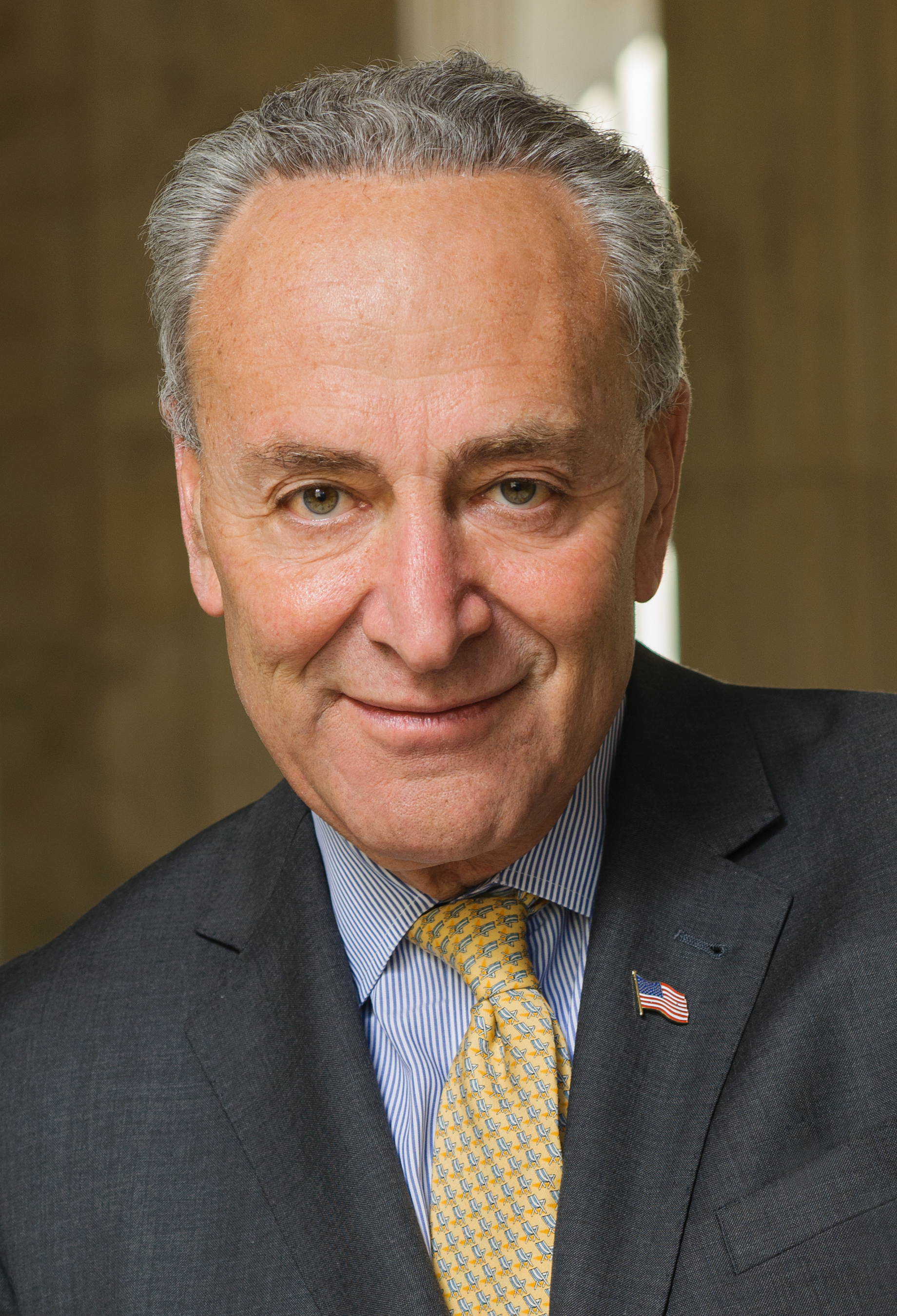
Democratic leader
Chuck Schumer

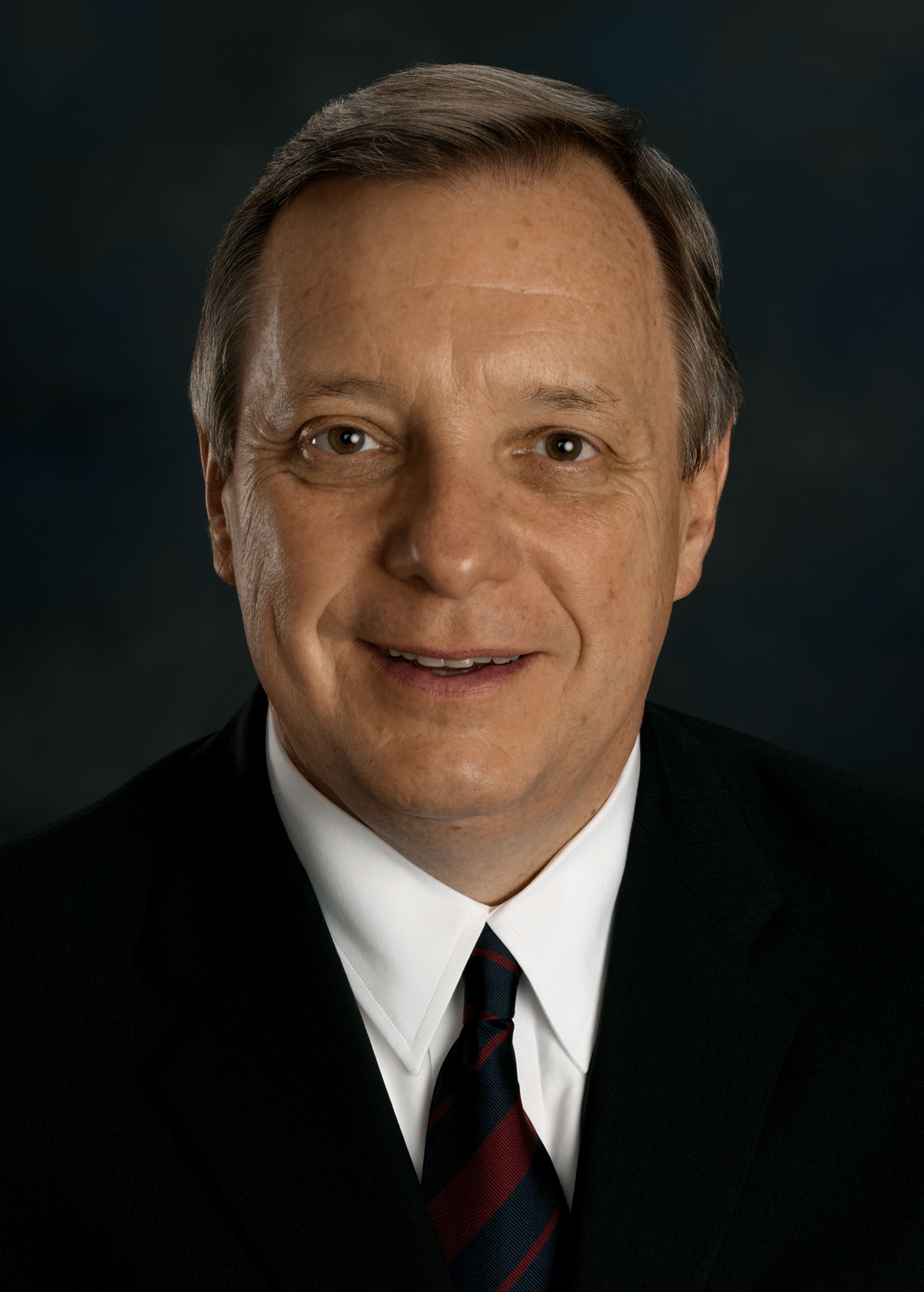
Democratic whip
Dick Durbin

=== House of Representatives ===
==== Alabama ====
▌1. Bradley Byrne (R)
▌2. Martha Roby (R)
▌3. Mike Rogers (R)
▌4. Robert Aderholt (R)
▌5. Mo Brooks (R)
▌6. Gary Palmer (R)
▌7. Terri Sewell (D)

==== Alaska ====
▌At-large. Don Young (R)

==== Arizona ====
▌1. Tom O'Halleran (D)
▌2. Ann Kirkpatrick (D)
▌3. Raúl Grijalva (D)
▌4. Paul Gosar (R)
▌5. Andy Biggs (R)
▌6. David Schweikert (R)
▌7. Ruben Gallego (D)
▌8. Debbie Lesko (R)
▌9. Greg Stanton (D)

==== Arkansas ====
▌1. Rick Crawford (R)
▌2. French Hill (R)
▌3. Steve Womack (R)
▌4. Bruce Westerman (R)

==== California ====
▌1. Doug LaMalfa (R)
▌2. Jared Huffman (D)
▌3. John Garamendi (D)
▌4. Tom McClintock (R)
▌5. Mike Thompson (D)
▌6. Doris Matsui (D)
▌7. Ami Bera (D)
▌8. Paul Cook (R) (until December 7, 2020, vacant thereafter)
▌9. Jerry McNerney (D)
▌10. Josh Harder (D)
▌11. Mark DeSaulnier (D)
▌12. Nancy Pelosi (D)
▌13. Barbara Lee (D)
▌14. Jackie Speier (D)
▌15. Eric Swalwell (D)
▌16. Jim Costa (D)
▌17. Ro Khanna (D)
▌18. Anna Eshoo (D)
▌19. Zoe Lofgren (D)
▌20. Jimmy Panetta (D)
▌21. TJ Cox (D)
▌22. Devin Nunes (R)
▌23. Kevin McCarthy (R)
▌24. Salud Carbajal (D)
▌25. Katie Hill (D) (until November 3, 2019)

▌Mike Garcia (R) (from May 12, 2020)

▌26. Julia Brownley (D)
▌27. Judy Chu (D)
▌28. Adam Schiff (D)
▌29. Tony Cárdenas (D)
▌30. Brad Sherman (D)
▌31. Pete Aguilar (D)
▌32. Grace Napolitano (D)
▌33. Ted Lieu (D)
▌34. Jimmy Gomez (D)
▌35. Norma Torres (D)
▌36. Raul Ruiz (D)
▌37. Karen Bass (D)
▌38. Linda Sánchez (D)
▌39. Gil Cisneros (D)
▌40. Lucille Roybal-Allard (D)
▌41. Mark Takano (D)
▌42. Ken Calvert (R)
▌43. Maxine Waters (D)
▌44. Nanette Barragán (D)
▌45. Katie Porter (D)
▌46. Lou Correa (D)
▌47. Alan Lowenthal (D)
▌48. Harley Rouda (D)
▌49. Mike Levin (D)
▌50. Duncan D. Hunter (R) (until January 13, 2020, vacant thereafter)
▌51. Juan Vargas (D)
▌52. Scott Peters (D)
▌53. Susan Davis (D)

==== Colorado ====
▌1. Diana DeGette (D)
▌2. Joe Neguse (D)
▌3. Scott Tipton (R)
▌4. Ken Buck (R)
▌5. Doug Lamborn (R)
▌6. Jason Crow (D)
▌7. Ed Perlmutter (D)

==== Connecticut ====
▌1. John B. Larson (D)
▌2. Joe Courtney (D)
▌3. Rosa DeLauro (D)
▌4. Jim Himes (D)
▌5. Jahana Hayes (D)

==== Delaware ====
▌At-large. Lisa Blunt Rochester (D)

==== Florida ====
▌1. Matt Gaetz (R)
▌2. Neal Dunn (R)
▌3. Ted Yoho (R)
▌4. John Rutherford (R)
▌5. Al Lawson (D)
▌6. Mike Waltz (R)
▌7. Stephanie Murphy (D)
▌8. Bill Posey (R)
▌9. Darren Soto (D)
▌10. Val Demings (D)
▌11. Daniel Webster (R)
▌12. Gus Bilirakis (R)
▌13. Charlie Crist (D)
▌14. Kathy Castor (D)
▌15. Ross Spano (R)
▌16. Vern Buchanan (R)
▌17. Greg Steube (R)
▌18. Brian Mast (R)
▌19. Francis Rooney (R)
▌20. Alcee Hastings (D)
▌21. Lois Frankel (D)
▌22. Ted Deutch (D)
▌23. Debbie Wasserman Schultz (D)
▌24. Frederica Wilson (D)
▌25. Mario Díaz-Balart (R)
▌26. Debbie Mucarsel-Powell (D)
▌27. Donna Shalala (D)

==== Georgia ====
▌1. Buddy Carter (R)
▌2. Sanford Bishop (D)
▌3. Drew Ferguson (R)
▌4. Hank Johnson (D)
▌5. John Lewis (D) (until July 17, 2020)

▌Kwanza Hall (D) (from December 1, 2020)

▌6. Lucy McBath (D)
▌7. Rob Woodall (R)
▌8. Austin Scott (R)
▌9. Doug Collins (R)
▌10. Jody Hice (R)
▌11. Barry Loudermilk (R)
▌12. Rick W. Allen (R)
▌13. David Scott (D)
▌14. Tom Graves (R) (until October 4, 2020, vacant thereafter)

==== Hawaii ====
▌1. Ed Case (D)
▌2. Tulsi Gabbard (D)

==== Idaho ====
▌1. Russ Fulcher (R)
▌2. Mike Simpson (R)

==== Illinois ====
▌1. Bobby Rush (D)
▌2. Robin Kelly (D)
▌3. Dan Lipinski (D)
▌4. Jesús "Chuy" García (D)
▌5. Mike Quigley (D)
▌6. Sean Casten (D)
▌7. Danny K. Davis (D)
▌8. Raja Krishnamoorthi (D)
▌9. Jan Schakowsky (D)
▌10. Brad Schneider (D)
▌11. Bill Foster (D)
▌12. Mike Bost (R)
▌13. Rodney Davis (R)
▌14. Lauren Underwood (D)
▌15. John Shimkus (R)
▌16. Adam Kinzinger (R)
▌17. Cheri Bustos (D)
▌18. Darin LaHood (R)

==== Indiana ====
▌1. Pete Visclosky (D)
▌2. Jackie Walorski (R)
▌3. Jim Banks (R)
▌4. Jim Baird (R)
▌5. Susan Brooks (R)
▌6. Greg Pence (R)
▌7. André Carson (D)
▌8. Larry Bucshon (R)
▌9. Trey Hollingsworth (R)

==== Iowa ====
▌1. Abby Finkenauer (D)
▌2. Dave Loebsack (D)
▌3. Cindy Axne (D)
▌4. Steve King (R)

==== Kansas ====
▌1. Roger Marshall (R)
▌2. Steve Watkins (R)
▌3. Sharice Davids (D)
▌4. Ron Estes (R)

==== Kentucky ====
▌1. James Comer (R)
▌2. Brett Guthrie (R)
▌3. John Yarmuth (D)
▌4. Thomas Massie (R)
▌5. Hal Rogers (R)
▌6. Andy Barr (R)

==== Louisiana ====
▌1. Steve Scalise (R)
▌2. Cedric Richmond (D)
▌3. Clay Higgins (R)
▌4. Mike Johnson (R)
▌5. Ralph Abraham (R)
▌6. Garret Graves (R)

==== Maine ====
▌1. Chellie Pingree (D)
▌2. Jared Golden (D)

==== Maryland ====
▌1. Andy Harris (R)
▌2. Dutch Ruppersberger (D)
▌3. John Sarbanes (D)
▌4. Anthony Brown (D)
▌5. Steny Hoyer (D)
▌6. David Trone (D)
▌7. Elijah Cummings (D) (until October 17, 2019)

▌Kweisi Mfume (D) (from April 28, 2020)

▌8. Jamie Raskin (D)

==== Massachusetts ====
▌1. Richard Neal (D)
▌2. Jim McGovern (D)
▌3. Lori Trahan (D)
▌4. Joe Kennedy III (D)
▌5. Katherine Clark (D)
▌6. Seth Moulton (D)
▌7. Ayanna Pressley (D)
▌8. Stephen Lynch (D)
▌9. Bill Keating (D)

==== Michigan ====
▌1. Jack Bergman (R)
▌2. Bill Huizenga (R)
▌▌▌3. Justin Amash (R, then I, then L) (Note: In Michigan's 3rd district: Justin Amash changed from Republican to Independent, July 4, 2019. He became a Libertarian on May 1, 2020.)
▌4. John Moolenaar (R)
▌5. Dan Kildee (D)
▌6. Fred Upton (R)
▌7. Tim Walberg (R)
▌8. Elissa Slotkin (D)
▌9. Andy Levin (D)
▌▌10. Paul Mitchell (R, then I)
▌11. Haley Stevens (D)
▌12. Debbie Dingell (D)
▌13. Rashida Tlaib (D)
▌14. Brenda Lawrence (D)

==== Minnesota ====
▌1. Jim Hagedorn (R)
▌2. Angie Craig (DFL)
▌3. Dean Phillips (DFL)
▌4. Betty McCollum (DFL)
▌5. Ilhan Omar (DFL)
▌6. Tom Emmer (R)
▌7. Collin Peterson (DFL)
▌8. Pete Stauber (R)

==== Mississippi ====
▌1. Trent Kelly (R)
▌2. Bennie Thompson (D)
▌3. Michael Guest (R)
▌4. Steven Palazzo (R)

==== Missouri ====
▌1. Lacy Clay (D)
▌2. Ann Wagner (R)
▌3. Blaine Luetkemeyer (R)
▌4. Vicky Hartzler (R)
▌5. Emanuel Cleaver (D)
▌6. Sam Graves (R)
▌7. Billy Long (R)
▌8. Jason Smith (R)

==== Montana ====
▌At-large. Greg Gianforte (R)

==== Nebraska ====
▌1. Jeff Fortenberry (R)
▌2. Don Bacon (R)
▌3. Adrian Smith (R)

==== Nevada ====
▌1. Dina Titus (D)
▌2. Mark Amodei (R)
▌3. Susie Lee (D)
▌4. Steven Horsford (D)

==== New Hampshire ====
▌1. Chris Pappas (D)
▌2. Annie Kuster (D)

==== New Jersey ====
▌1. Donald Norcross (D)
▌▌2. Jeff Van Drew (D, then R) (Note: In New Jersey's 2nd district: Jeff Van Drew changed from Democratic to Republican, December 19, 2019.)
▌3. Andy Kim (D)
▌4. Chris Smith (R)
▌5. Josh Gottheimer (D)
▌6. Frank Pallone (D)
▌7. Tom Malinowski (D)
▌8. Albio Sires (D)
▌9. Bill Pascrell (D)
▌10. Donald Payne Jr. (D)
▌11. Mikie Sherrill (D)
▌12. Bonnie Watson Coleman (D)

==== New Mexico ====
▌1. Deb Haaland (D)
▌2. Xochitl Torres Small (D)
▌3. Ben Ray Luján (D)

==== New York ====
▌1. Lee Zeldin (R)
▌2. Peter T. King (R)
▌3. Thomas Suozzi (D)
▌4. Kathleen Rice (D)
▌5. Gregory Meeks (D)
▌6. Grace Meng (D)
▌7. Nydia Velázquez (D)
▌8. Hakeem Jeffries (D)
▌9. Yvette Clarke (D)
▌10. Jerry Nadler (D)
▌11. Max Rose (D)
▌12. Carolyn Maloney (D)
▌13. Adriano Espaillat (D)
▌14. Alexandria Ocasio-Cortez (D)
▌15. José E. Serrano (D)
▌16. Eliot Engel (D)
▌17. Nita Lowey (D)
▌18. Sean Patrick Maloney (D)
▌19. Antonio Delgado (D)
▌20. Paul Tonko (D)
▌21. Elise Stefanik (R)
▌22. Anthony Brindisi (D)
▌23. Tom Reed (R)
▌24. John Katko (R)
▌25. Joseph Morelle (D)
▌26. Brian Higgins (D)
▌27. Chris Collins (R) (until October 1, 2019)

▌Chris Jacobs (R) (from June 23, 2020)

==== North Carolina ====
▌1. G. K. Butterfield (D)
▌2. George Holding (R)
▌3. Walter B. Jones Jr. (R) (until February 10, 2019)

▌Greg Murphy (R) (from September 10, 2019)

▌4. David Price (D)
▌5. Virginia Foxx (R)
▌6. Mark Walker (R)
▌7. David Rouzer (R)
▌8. Richard Hudson (R)
▌9. Dan Bishop (R) (from September 10, 2019)
▌10. Patrick McHenry (R)
▌11. Mark Meadows (R) (until March 30, 2020, vacant thereafter)
▌12. Alma Adams (D)
▌13. Ted Budd (R)

==== North Dakota ====
▌At-large. Kelly Armstrong (R)

==== Ohio ====
▌1. Steve Chabot (R)
▌2. Brad Wenstrup (R)
▌3. Joyce Beatty (D)
▌4. Jim Jordan (R)
▌5. Bob Latta (R)
▌6. Bill Johnson (R)
▌7. Bob Gibbs (R)
▌8. Warren Davidson (R)
▌9. Marcy Kaptur (D)
▌10. Mike Turner (R)
▌11. Marcia Fudge (D)
▌12. Troy Balderson (R)
▌13. Tim Ryan (D)
▌14. David Joyce (R)
▌15. Steve Stivers (R)
▌16. Anthony Gonzalez (R)

==== Oklahoma ====
▌1. Kevin Hern (R)
▌2. Markwayne Mullin (R)
▌3. Frank Lucas (R)
▌4. Tom Cole (R)
▌5. Kendra Horn (D)

==== Oregon ====
▌1. Suzanne Bonamici (D)
▌2. Greg Walden (R)
▌3. Earl Blumenauer (D)
▌4. Peter DeFazio (D)
▌5. Kurt Schrader (D)

==== Pennsylvania ====
▌1. Brian Fitzpatrick (R)
▌2. Brendan Boyle (D)
▌3. Dwight Evans (D)
▌4. Madeleine Dean (D)
▌5. Mary Gay Scanlon (D)
▌6. Chrissy Houlahan (D)
▌7. Susan Wild (D)
▌8. Matt Cartwright (D)
▌9. Dan Meuser (R)
▌10. Scott Perry (R)
▌11. Lloyd Smucker (R)
▌12. Tom Marino (R) (until January 23, 2019)

▌Fred Keller (R) (from May 21, 2019)

▌13. John Joyce (R)
▌14. Guy Reschenthaler (R)
▌15. Glenn Thompson (R)
▌16. Mike Kelly (R)
▌17. Conor Lamb (D)
▌18. Mike Doyle (D)

==== Rhode Island ====
▌1. David Cicilline (D)
▌2. James Langevin (D)

==== South Carolina ====
▌1. Joe Cunningham (D)
▌2. Joe Wilson (R)
▌3. Jeff Duncan (R)
▌4. William Timmons (R)
▌5. Ralph Norman (R)
▌6. Jim Clyburn (D)
▌7. Tom Rice (R)

==== South Dakota ====
▌At-large. Dusty Johnson (R)

==== Tennessee ====
▌1. Phil Roe (R)
▌2. Tim Burchett (R)
▌3. Chuck Fleischmann (R)
▌4. Scott DesJarlais (R)
▌5. Jim Cooper (D)
▌6. John Rose (R)
▌7. Mark E. Green (R)
▌8. David Kustoff (R)
▌9. Steve Cohen (D)

==== Texas ====
▌1. Louie Gohmert (R)
▌2. Dan Crenshaw (R)
▌3. Van Taylor (R)
▌4. John Ratcliffe (R) (until May 22, 2020, vacant thereafter)
▌5. Lance Gooden (R)
▌6. Ron Wright (R)
▌7. Lizzie Fletcher (D)
▌8. Kevin Brady (R)
▌9. Al Green (D)
▌10. Michael McCaul (R)
▌11. Mike Conaway (R)
▌12. Kay Granger (R)
▌13. Mac Thornberry (R)
▌14. Randy Weber (R)
▌15. Vicente Gonzalez (D)
▌16. Veronica Escobar (D)
▌17. Bill Flores (R)
▌18. Sheila Jackson Lee (D)
▌19. Jodey Arrington (R)
▌20. Joaquin Castro (D)
▌21. Chip Roy (R)
▌22. Pete Olson (R)
▌23. Will Hurd (R)
▌24. Kenny Marchant (R)
▌25. Roger Williams (R)
▌26. Michael C. Burgess (R)
▌27. Michael Cloud (R)
▌28. Henry Cuellar (D)
▌29. Sylvia Garcia (D)
▌30. Eddie Bernice Johnson (D)
▌31. John Carter (R)
▌32. Colin Allred (D)
▌33. Marc Veasey (D)
▌34. Filemon Vela Jr. (D)
▌35. Lloyd Doggett (D)
▌36. Brian Babin (R)

==== Utah ====
▌1. Rob Bishop (R)
▌2. Chris Stewart (R)
▌3. John Curtis (R)
▌4. Ben McAdams (D)

==== Vermont ====
▌At-large. Peter Welch (D)

==== Virginia ====
▌1. Rob Wittman (R)
▌2. Elaine Luria (D)
▌3. Bobby Scott (D)
▌4. Donald McEachin (D)
▌5. Denver Riggleman (R)
▌6. Ben Cline (R)
▌7. Abigail Spanberger (D)
▌8. Don Beyer (D)
▌9. Morgan Griffith (R)
▌10. Jennifer Wexton (D)
▌11. Gerry Connolly (D)

==== Washington ====
▌1. Suzan DelBene (D)
▌2. Rick Larsen (D)
▌3. Jaime Herrera Beutler (R)
▌4. Dan Newhouse (R)
▌5. Cathy McMorris Rodgers (R)
▌6. Derek Kilmer (D)
▌7. Pramila Jayapal (D)
▌8. Kim Schrier (D)
▌9. Adam Smith (D)
▌10. Denny Heck (D)

==== West Virginia ====
▌1. David McKinley (R)
▌2. Alex Mooney (R)
▌3. Carol Miller (R)

==== Wisconsin ====
▌1. Bryan Steil (R)
▌2. Mark Pocan (D)
▌3. Ron Kind (D)
▌4. Gwen Moore (D)
▌5. Jim Sensenbrenner (R)
▌6. Glenn Grothman (R)
▌7. Sean Duffy (R) (until September 23, 2019)

▌Tom Tiffany (R) (from May 12, 2020)

▌8. Mike Gallagher (R)

==== Wyoming ====
▌At-large. Liz Cheney (R)

==== Non-voting members ====
▌American Samoa. Amata Coleman Radewagen (R)
▌District of Columbia. Eleanor Holmes Norton (D)
▌Guam. Michael San Nicolas (D)
▌Northern Mariana Islands. Gregorio Sablan (I)
▌▌Puerto Rico. Jenniffer González-Colón (PNP/R)
▌United States Virgin Islands. Stacey Plaskett (D)

House composition by district Democratic member Republican member Libertarian member Vacant seat

House majority leadership

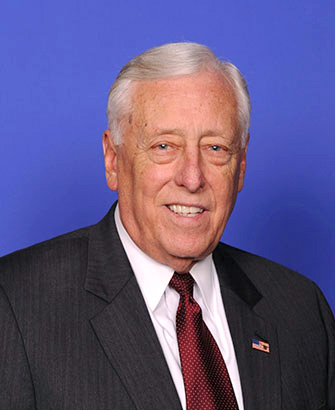
Democratic leader
Steny Hoyer

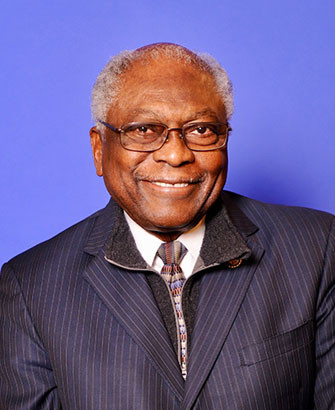
Democratic whip
Jim Clyburn

House minority leadership

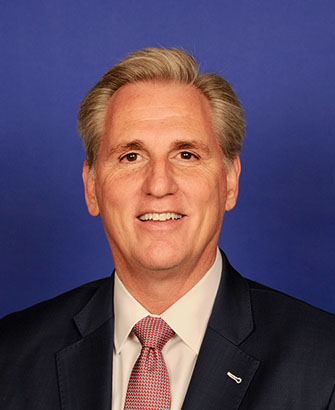
Republican leader
Kevin McCarthy

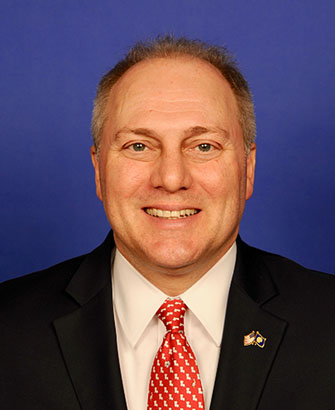
Republican whip
Steve Scalise

== Changes in membership ==
=== Senate ===
Senate changes
State (class)	Vacated by	Reason for change	Successor	Date of successor's formal installation (Note: When seated or oath administered, not necessarily when service began.)
Florida (1)	Vacant	Senator-elect chose to wait until finishing term as Governor of Florida before taking his seat.	Rick Scott (R)	January 8, 2019
Georgia (3)	Johnny Isakson (R)	Incumbent resigned December 31, 2019. Successor was appointed the same day to continue the term.	Kelly Loeffler (R)	January 6, 2020
Arizona (3)	Martha McSally (R)	Appointee lost special election to finish the term. Successor elected November 3, 2020, to finish the term ending January 3, 2023.	Mark Kelly (D)	December 2, 2020

=== House of Representatives ===
House changes
District	Vacated by	Reason for change	Successor	Date of successor's formal installation
North Carolina 9	Vacant	Vacant from the start of the term as allegations of fraud in the 2018 general election prevented the results from being certified. A special election was held September 10, 2019.	Dan Bishop (R)	September 17, 2019
Pennsylvania 12	Tom Marino (R)	Resigned January 23, 2019, to take job in the private sector. A special election was held May 21, 2019.	Fred Keller (R)	June 3, 2019
North Carolina 3	Walter B. Jones Jr. (R)	Died February 10, 2019. A special election was held September 10, 2019.	Greg Murphy (R)	September 17, 2019
Michigan 3	Justin Amash (R)	Changed party July 4, 2019.	Justin Amash (I)	July 4, 2019
Wisconsin 7	Sean Duffy (R)	Resigned September 23, 2019. A special election was held May 12, 2020.	Tom Tiffany (R)	May 19, 2020
New York 27	Chris Collins (R)	Resigned October 1, 2019. A special election was held June 23, 2020.	Chris Jacobs (R)	July 21, 2020
Maryland 7	Elijah Cummings (D)	Died October 17, 2019. A special election was held April 28, 2020.	Kweisi Mfume (D)	May 5, 2020
California 25	Katie Hill (D)	Resigned November 3, 2019, due to allegations of improper relationships with staffer. A special election was held March 3, 2020, and a runoff election was held May 12, 2020.	Mike Garcia (R)	May 19, 2020
New Jersey 2	Jeff Van Drew (D)	Changed party December 19, 2019.	Jeff Van Drew (R)	December 19, 2019
California 50	Duncan D. Hunter (R)	Resigned January 13, 2020, following felony indictment.	Vacant until the next Congress	
North Carolina 11	Mark Meadows (R)	Resigned March 30, 2020, to become White House Chief of Staff.	Vacant until the next Congress	
Michigan 3	Justin Amash (I)	Changed party May 1, 2020.	Justin Amash (L)	May 1, 2020
Texas 4	John Ratcliffe (R)	Resigned May 22, 2020, to become Director of National Intelligence.	Vacant until the next Congress	
Georgia 5	John Lewis (D)	Died July 17, 2020. A special election runoff was held December 1, 2020.	Kwanza Hall (D)	December 3, 2020
Georgia 14	Tom Graves (R)	Resigned October 4, 2020.	Vacant until the next Congress	
California 8	Paul Cook (R)	Resigned December 7, 2020, after being elected a member of the San Bernardino County Supervisors.	Vacant until the next Congress	
Michigan 10	Paul Mitchell (R)	Changed party December 14, 2020.	Paul Mitchell (I)	December 14, 2020

== Committees ==
Section contents: Senate, House, Joint

=== Senate ===
Committee	Chair	Ranking Member
Aging (Special)	Tim Scott (R-SC)	Bob Casey Jr. (D-PA)
Agriculture, Nutrition and Forestry	Pat Roberts (R-KS)	Debbie Stabenow (D-MI)
Appropriations	Richard Shelby (R-AL)	Patrick Leahy (D-VT)
Armed Services	Jim Inhofe (R-OK)	Jack Reed (D-RI)
Banking, Housing and Urban Affairs	Mike Crapo (R-ID)	Sherrod Brown (D-OH)
Budget	Mike Enzi (R-WY)	Bernie Sanders (I-VT)
Commerce, Science and Transportation	Roger Wicker (R-MS)	Maria Cantwell (D-WA)
Energy and Natural Resources	Lisa Murkowski (R-AK)	Joe Manchin (D-WV)
Environment and Public Works	John Barrasso (R-WY)	Tom Carper (D-DE)
Ethics (Select)	Johnny Isakson (R-GA) until December 2019; James Lankford (R-OK) from January 2020	Chris Coons (D-DE)
Finance	Chuck Grassley (R-IA)	Ron Wyden (D-OR)
Foreign Relations	Jim Risch (R-ID)	Bob Menendez (D-NJ)
Health, Education, Labor and Pensions	Lamar Alexander (R-TN)	Patty Murray (D-WA)
Homeland Security and Governmental Affairs	Ron Johnson (R-WI)	Gary Peters (D-MI)
Indian Affairs (Permanent Select)	John Hoeven (R-ND)	Tom Udall (D-NM)
Intelligence (Select)	Richard Burr (R-NC) until May 15, 2020; Marco Rubio (R-FL) Acting from May 18, 2020	Mark Warner (D-VA)
International Narcotics Control (Permanent Caucus)	John Cornyn (R-TX)	Dianne Feinstein (D-CA)
Judiciary	Lindsey Graham (R-SC)	Dianne Feinstein (D-CA)
Rules and Administration	Roy Blunt (R-MO)	Amy Klobuchar (D-MN)
Small Business and Entrepreneurship	Marco Rubio (R-FL)	Ben Cardin (D-MD)
Veterans' Affairs	Johnny Isakson (R-GA) until December 2019; Jerry Moran (R-KS) from January 2020	Jon Tester (D-MT)

=== House of Representatives ===
Committee	Chair	Ranking Member
Agriculture	Collin Peterson (D-MN)	Mike Conaway (R-TX)
Appropriations	Nita Lowey (D-NY)	Kay Granger (R-TX)
Armed Services	Adam Smith (D-WA)	Mac Thornberry (R-TX)
Budget	John Yarmuth (D-KY)	Steve Womack (R-AR)
Climate Crisis (Select)	Kathy Castor (D-FL)	Garret Graves (R-LA)
Education and Labor	Bobby Scott (D-VA)	Virginia Foxx (R-NC)
Energy and Commerce	Frank Pallone (D-NJ)	Greg Walden (R-OR)
Ethics	Ted Deutch (D-FL)	Kenny Marchant (R-TX)
Financial Services	Maxine Waters (D-CA)	Patrick McHenry (R-NC)
Foreign Affairs	Eliot Engel (D-NY)	Michael McCaul (R-TX)
Homeland Security	Bennie Thompson (D-MS)	Mike Rogers (R-AL)
House Administration	Zoe Lofgren (D-CA)	Rodney Davis (R-IL)
Intelligence (Permanent Select)	Adam Schiff (D-CA)	Devin Nunes (R-CA)
Judiciary	Jerrold Nadler (D-NY)	Doug Collins (R-GA) (until March 12, 2020); Jim Jordan (R-OH) (from March 12, 2020)
Modernization of Congress (Select)	Derek Kilmer (D-WA)	Tom Graves (R-GA) (until October 4, 2020)
Natural Resources	Raúl Grijalva (D-AZ)	Rob Bishop (R-UT)
Oversight and Reform	Elijah Cummings (D-MD) (until October 17, 2019); Carolyn Maloney (D-NY) (from October 17, 2019)	Jim Jordan (R-OH) (until March 12, 2020, from March 31, 2020 – June 29, 2020); Mark Meadows (R-NC) (March 12, 2020 – March 30, 2020); James Comer (from June 29, 2020)
Rules	Jim McGovern (D-MA)	Tom Cole (R-OK)
Science, Space and Technology	Eddie Bernice Johnson (D-TX)	Frank Lucas (R-OK)
Small Business	Nydia Velázquez (D-NY)	Steve Chabot (R-OH)
Transportation and Infrastructure	Peter DeFazio (D-OR)	Sam Graves (R-MO)
Veterans' Affairs	Mark Takano (D-CA)	Phil Roe (R-TN)
Ways and Means	Richard Neal (D-MA)	Kevin Brady (R-TX)

=== Joint ===
Committee	Chair	Vice Chair	Ranking Member	Vice Ranking Member
Economic	Mike Lee (R-UT)	Carolyn Maloney (D-NY) (until January 16, 2020); Don Beyer (D-VA) (from January 16, 2020)	David Schweikert (R-AZ)	Martin Heinrich (D-NM)
Inaugural Ceremonies (Special)	Roy Blunt (R-MO)	Nancy Pelosi (D-CA)	Kevin McCarthy (R-CA)	Amy Klobuchar (D-MN)
Library	Roy Blunt (R-MO)	Zoe Lofgren (D-CA)	Rodney Davis (R-IL)	Amy Klobuchar (D-MN)
Printing	Zoe Lofgren (D-CA)	Roy Blunt (R-MO)	Amy Klobuchar (D-MN)	Rodney Davis (R-IL)
Taxation (Note: The Joint Taxation Committee leadership rotate the chair and vice chair and the ranking members between the House and Senate at the start of each session (calendar year) in the middle of the congressional term. The first session leadership is shown here.)	Richard Neal (D-MA)	Chuck Grassley (R-IA)	Ron Wyden (D-OR)	Kevin Brady (R-TX)

== Employees and legislative agency directors ==
Also called "elected" or "appointed" officials, there are many employees of the House and Senate whose leaders are included here.

=== Senate ===
- Chaplain: Barry C. Black (Seventh-day Adventist)
- Historian: Betty Koed
- Parliamentarian: Elizabeth MacDonough
- Secretary: Julie E. Adams
- Sergeant at Arms: Michael C. Stenger
- Secretary for the Majority:
  - until February 2020: Laura Dove
  - starting February 2020: Robert Duncan
- Secretary for the Minority: Gary B. Myrick

=== House of Representatives ===
- Chaplain: Patrick J. Conroy (Roman Catholic)
- Chief Administrative Officer: Phil Kiko
- Clerk:
  - until February 26, 2019: Karen L. Haas
  - starting February 26, 2019: Cheryl L. Johnson
- Historian: Matthew Wasniewski
- Inspector General: Michael Ptasienski
- Parliamentarian:
  - until September 30, 2020: Thomas J. Wickham Jr.
  - starting September 30, 2020: Jason A. Smith
- Reading Clerks: Susan Cole (R) and Joseph Novotny (D)
- Sergeant at Arms: Paul D. Irving

=== Legislative branch agency directors ===
- Architect of the Capitol:
  - until August 17, 2019: Christine A. Merdon (acting)
  - August 17, 2019 – January 16, 2020: Thomas J. Carroll III (acting)
  - starting January 16, 2020: Brett Blanton
- Attending Physician of the United States Congress: Brian P. Monahan
- Comptroller General of the United States: Gene Dodaro
- Director of the Congressional Budget Office:
  - until May 31, 2019: Keith Hall
  - starting June 3, 2019: Phillip Swagel
- Librarian of Congress: Carla Diane Hayden
- Director of the U.S. Government Publishing Office: Vacant
- Counselor of the Office of the Law Revision Counsel: Ralph V. Seep
- Counselor of the Office of House Legislative Counsel: Ernest Wade Ballou Jr.
- Public Printer of the United States: Hugh N. Halpern

== See also ==
=== Elections ===
- 2018 United States elections (elections leading to this Congress)
  - 2018 United States Senate elections
  - 2018 United States House of Representatives elections
- 2019 United States elections (elections during this Congress)
  - 2019 United States House of Representatives elections
- 2020 United States elections (elections during this Congress, leading to the next Congress)
  - 2020 United States presidential election
  - 2020 United States Senate elections
  - 2020 United States House of Representatives elections

=== Membership lists ===
- List of new members of the 116th United States Congress
