= Malala Yousafzai Scholarship Act =

United States law

- Long title: "An Act To expand the number of scholarships available to Pakistani women under the Merit and Needs-Based Scholarship Program"
- Enacted by: the 116th United States Congress

Citations
- Public law: Pub. L. 116–338 (text) (PDF)

Legislative history
- Passed the United States House of Representatives on November 19, 2020

Malala Yousafzai Scholarship Act is a scholarship law of the United States that was originally introduced by the 113th United States Congress on November 19, 2014, after the Senate and the United States House of Representatives passed it in 2020. It is primarily established to allow American educational institutions to increase the number of higher education scholarships based on merit-based and needs-based programs reserved for Pakistani women under the student financial aid program.

Passed in March 2020 and partially enacted on January 1, 2021, it is used to determine and address the scholarship programmes aimed at providing educational fundings for Pakistani women receiving higher education anywhere in the country. It is reportedly made available from 2020 and will continue till 2022 under the Higher Education Commission.

== Overview ==
To invest in the education sectors, it requires the United States Agency for International Development to consult the Pakistani private and public sector in the U.S. to improve the access to education programmes in Pakistan. Previously, the United States Agency for International Development has awarded more than 6,000 scholarships since 2010; however the bill expands this programme to make the education accessible for all women in the country. The bill is named after Pakistani Nobel laureate Malala Yousafzai.
