= Payment Integrity Information Act of 2019 =

US law to identify improper payments

- Long title: An act to identify and reduce improper payments by government agencies
- Enacted by: the 116th United States Congress
- Effective: March 2, 2020

Legislative history
- Introduced in the Senate as S. 375 by Thomas R. Carper (D–DE) on February 7, 2019; Passed the Senate on 07/16/2019; Passed the House of Representatives on February 5, 2020; Signed into law by President Donald Trump on March 2, 2020

The Payment Integrity Information Act of 2019 (PIIA) is a federal law passed on March 2, 2020, to help identify and reduce improper payments by government agencies.

Overpayment or fraudulent payments by government agencies is a long-standing problem.

== Background ==
Improper and fraudulent payments erroneously paid either for the wrong amounts or for the wrong reasons, are an ongoing issue of US government agencies. Since FY2004, agencies have reported approximately $3.0 trillion in improper payments.

Improper payments are defined as:

“A payment that was made in an incorrect amount under statutory, contractual, administrative, or other legally applicable requirements. The term improper payment includes; any payment to an ineligible recipient; any payment for an ineligible good or service; any duplicate payment; any payment for a good or service not received, except for those payments where authorized by law; and any payment that does not authorized by law; and any payment that does not account for credit for applicable discounts.”

Of all the federal program liable to reporting, certain ones seem to report overpayments each year, including Medicare, Medicaid, Unemployment Insurance, Supplemental Security Income, and the Earned Income Tax Credit. Since 2024 these programs have accounted for 77% of improper payments reported, estimated to be approximately $2.3 trillion. According to the GAO in FY2025, Medicare, the federal program that covers healthcare costs for the elderly, reported $57 billion in improper payments; Medicaid, the joint federal-state program for the poor, reported $37 billion in improper payments, thus these two programs alone accounted for 51 percent of the improper payments.

== Provisions ==
As part of ongoing efforts to reduce improper payments, Congress passed several laws from 2002 and 2015. These included the Improper Payments Information Act of 2002, the Improper Payments Elimination and Recovery Act of 2010, the Improper Payments Elimination Recovery Act of 2012, and the Fraud Reduction and Data Analytics Act of 2015. The Payment Integrity Information Act of 2019 was intended to merge these and incorporate the provisions of these laws, as well as new ones.

PIIA requires the Offices of Inspector General (OIG) of Federal agencies to report annually on efforts to identify improper payments and to reduce improper payments (IP).

The goal of the new legislation was to encourage greater cooperation and transparency between agencies and the Office of Management and Budget (OMB) to reduce or minimize the likelihood of duplication of programs.

For every program with a budget of more than $10 million PIIA requires federal agencies to evaluate the likelihood of improper payments, an estimate of what it may be, and develop a plan to reduce the risk and capture overpayments.

Programs that spend more than $1 million annually must develop a recovery audit program. The agency's inspector general must determine whether or not they meet PIIA compliance requirements.

== Effectiveness ==
The program was somewhat successful, however, estimates of improper payments are still high: $281B in 2021, $247B in 2022, $236B in 2023, $162B in 2024 and $186B in 2025. In its 2023 report it found that 10 of the 24 agencies were non-compliant.

To evaluate the effectiveness of this program, the OIG conducts periodic audits to evaluate if agencies comply.

For example, an audit report on the HHS from 2023 entitled: Department of Health and Human Services Met Many Requirements, but It Did Not Fully Comply With the Payment Integrity Information Act of 2019 and Applicable Improper Payment Guidance for the Fiscal Year 2023, found that HHS met many of the criteria, but missed certain others, specifically related to Temporary Assistance for Needy Families, and Foster Care; Children’s Health Insurance Program, improvements to payment integrity for the Medicare Part C program, and others.

In an audit of the Department of Energy's 2023 report, they were found to be primarily compliant, with a few suggestions for improvement such as identifying the causes for IPs, also increasing staffing particularly in data analysis.

The Department of Commerce was fully compliant in 2024.

USAID was not compliant in 2024. They did not public list financial statements and officials said that they could not respond to the other items required to file.

In 2025 several agencies were found compliant: DOT ( Department of Transportation), DOC (Department of Commerce), EPA (Environmental Protection Agency), the VA (Veteran's Affairs), The Department of Interior, Department of State, and the Federal Trade Commission. Nonetheless, in 2025 there were still $186 Billion in improper payments.

== Other followup programs ==
In addition to this law, there have been additional suggestions and attempts to reduce the levels of fraud and overpayment. For example, the Department of Labor has initiated a review of how states are using the Unemployment Insurance (UI) Information Technology (IT) modernization funds which is part of the Employment and Training Administration (ETA), in an effort to reduce unemployment overpayments.

Another example is the White House Task Force to Eliminate Fraud led by Vice President JD Vance.
