= William E. Nichol =

American politician (1918–2006)

33rd Lieutenant Governor of Nebraska
- In office January 8, 1987 – January 9, 1991
- Governor: Kay A. Orr
- Preceded by: Donald McGinley
- Succeeded by: Maxine Moul

Speaker of the Nebraska Legislature
- In office January 5, 1983 – January 7, 1987
- Preceded by: Richard Marvel
- Succeeded by: Bill Barrett

Member of the Nebraska Legislature from the 48th district
- In office January 8, 1975 – January 7, 1987
- Preceded by: Charles Davey
- Succeeded by: John Weihing

Personal details
- Born: William Edison Nichol; March 12, 1918 Windsor, Colorado
- Died: November 29, 2006 (aged 88) Scottsbluff, Nebraska
- Party: Republican

William Edison Nichol (March 12, 1918 – November 29, 2006) was an American politician who served as the 33rd lieutenant governor of Nebraska from 1987 to 1991.

== Biography ==
Nichol was born in Windsor, Colorado in 1918. His parents were William A. and Marie (Kraning) Nichol. He went to high school in the Scottsbluff Public Schools system, graduating in 1935, and graduated from Nebraska Wesleyan University in 1940. He married his wife Ruth in 1941.

His political career began with local positions, as a county commissioner for Scotts Bluff County (1967–75), and as a city councilperson and mayor of Scottsbluff. He was first elected to the Nebraska Legislature in 1974, replacing longtime representative Terry Carpenter. He later served as speaker of the legislature. In 1987, Nichol was elected lieutenant governor, and Kay A. Orr won as governor. He decided not to seek reelection in 1991.

Nichol died in Scottsbluff on November 29, 2006 at a nursing home, aged 88 years.

Party political offices
Preceded by Roland Luedtke	Republican nominee for Lieutenant Governor of Nebraska; 1986	Succeeded by Jack Maddux
