= United States House Ways and Means Subcommittee on Health =

Subcommittee of Committee on Ways and Means
- Active United States House of Representatives; 119th Congress

Leadership
- Chair: Vern Buchanan (R)
- Ranking Member: Lloyd Doggett (D)

Structure
- Seats: 19 (19 currently filled) 11/11 8/8
- Political parties: Majority (11): Republican (11); Minority (8): Democratic (8)

Meeting place
- 1139, Longworth House Office Building; Washington, D.C. 20515

Phone number
- (202)-225-3943

The Subcommittee on Health is a subcommittee of the Committee on Ways and Means in the United States House of Representatives.

== Jurisdiction ==
From the House rules

- The jurisdiction of the Subcommittee on Health includes bills and matters referred to the Committee on Ways and Means that relate to programs providing payments (from any source) for health care, health delivery systems, or health research. More specifically, the jurisdiction of the Subcommittee on Health includes bills and matters that relate to the health care programs of the Social Security Act (including titles V, XI (Part B), XVIII, and XIX thereof) and, concurrent with the full Committee, tax credit and deduction provisions of the Internal Revenue Code dealing with health insurance premiums and health care costs.

== History ==
In 2014, the full committee voted to resist a subpoena from the Securities and Exchange Commission to look into insider trader allegations between subcommittee staff director Brian Sutter and Mark Hayes, a lobbyist at Greenberg Traurig.

== Members, 119th Congress ==
Majority	Minority
Vern Buchanan, Florida, Chair; Adrian Smith, Nebraska; Mike Kelly, Pennsylvania; Greg Murphy, North Carolina; Kevin Hern, Oklahoma; Carol Miller, West Virginia; Brian Fitzpatrick, Pennsylvania; Claudia Tenney, New York; Blake Moore, Utah; David Kustoff, Tennessee; Greg Steube, Florida	Lloyd Doggett, Texas, Ranking Member; Mike Thompson, California; Judy Chu, California; Dwight Evans, Pennsylvania; Danny Davis, Illinois; Steven Horsford, Nevada; Brendan Boyle, Pennsylvania; Linda Sánchez, California
Ex officio
Jason Smith, Missouri	Richard Neal, Massachusetts

== Historical membership rosters ==
=== 115th Congress ===
Majority	Minority
Pat Tiberi, Ohio, Chairman; Sam Johnson, Texas; Devin Nunes, California; Peter Roskam, Illinois; Vern Buchanan, Florida; Adrian Smith, Nebraska; Lynn Jenkins, Kansas; Kenny Marchant, Texas; Diane Black, Tennessee; Erik Paulsen, Minnesota; Tom Reed, New York	Sander Levin, Michigan, Ranking Member; Mike Thompson, California; Ron Kind, Wisconsin; Earl Blumenauer, Oregon; John Lewis, Georgia; Brian Higgins, New York; Terri Sewell, Alabama
Ex officio
Kevin Brady, Texas	Richard Neal, Massachusetts

=== 116th Congress ===
Majority	Minority
Lloyd Doggett, Texas, Chair; Mike Thompson, California; Earl Blumenauer, Oregon; Ron Kind, Wisconsin; Brian Higgins, New York; Terri Sewell, Alabama; Judy Chu, California; Dwight Evans, Pennsylvania; Brad Schneider, Illinois; Jimmy Gomez, California; Steven Horsford, Nevada	Devin Nunes, California, Ranking Member; Vern Buchanan, Florida; Adrian Smith, Nebraska; Kenny Marchant, Texas; Tom Reed, New York; Mike Kelly, Pennsylvania; George Holding, North Carolina
Ex officio
Richard Neal, Massachusetts	Kevin Brady, Texas

=== 117th Congress ===
Majority	Minority
Lloyd Doggett, Texas, Chair; Mike Thompson, California; Ron Kind, Wisconsin; Earl Blumenauer, Oregon; Brian Higgins, New York; Terri Sewell, Alabama; Judy Chu, California; Dwight Evans, Pennsylvania; Brad Schneider, Illinois; Jimmy Gomez, California; Steven Horsford, Nevada	Devin Nunes, California, Ranking Member; Vern Buchanan, Florida; Adrian Smith, Nebraska; Tom Reed, New York; Mike Kelly, Pennsylvania; Jason Smith, Missouri; David Schweikert, Arizona; Brad Wenstrup, Ohio
Ex officio
Richard Neal, Massachusetts	Kevin Brady, Texas

=== 118th Congress ===
Majority	Minority
Vern Buchanan, Florida, Chair; Adrian Smith, Nebraska; Mike Kelly, Pennsylvania; Brad Wenstrup, Ohio; Greg Murphy, North Carolina; Kevin Hern, Oklahoma; Carol Miller, West Virginia; Brian Fitzpatrick, Pennsylvania; Claudia Tenney, New York; Blake Moore, Utah; Michelle Steel, California	Lloyd Doggett, Texas, Ranking Member; Mike Thompson, California; Earl Blumenauer, Oregon; Brian Higgins, New York; Judy Chu, California; Dwight Evans, Pennsylvania; Danny Davis, Illinois; Don Beyer, Virginia
Ex officio
Jason Smith, Missouri	Richard Neal, Massachusetts

== See also ==
- United States House Energy Subcommittee on Health
