= Moving Forward Act =

Proposed legislation of the 116th United States Congress

- Long title: To authorize funds for Federal-aid highways, highway safety programs, and transit programs, and for other purposes.
- Enacted by: the 116th United States Congress
- Sponsored by: Peter DeFazio (D-OR)
- Number of co-sponsors: 129

Legislative history
- Committee consideration by Transportation and Infrastructure; Passed the House of Representatives on July 1, 2020 (233–188)

The Moving Forward Act (H.R. 2) was a bill introduced in the 116th Congress. It was a $1.5 trillion infrastructure package that included money for roads, bridges, railways, school buildings, expansion of broadband internet access, and replacement of lead water pipes. The bill also promotes electric vehicles and incentivizes the development of renewable energy on public lands. Other provisions in the bill attempt to modernize the USPS, and create postal service vehicles that have zero emissions. The bill also expands certain bonds and tax credits.
