= Joyce Hillman-Kortum =

American politician (1936–2019)

Member of the Nebraska Legislature from the 48th district
- In office January 9, 1991 – January 6, 1999
- Preceded by: John Weihing
- Succeeded by: Adrian Smith

Personal details
- Born: June 10, 1936 Deshler, Nebraska
- Died: November 20, 2019 (aged 83) Scottsbluff, Nebraska
- Party: Democratic
- Spouse(s): Kenneth Hillman (m. 1954; died 1995) Alfred Kortum (m. 2001; died 2019)
- Children: 3 (Janine, Shari, Terry)

Joyce Elaine Hillman-Kortum (née Higel, June 10, 1936 – November 20, 2019) was a Democratic politician from Nebraska who served as a member of the Nebraska Legislature from the 48th district from 1991 to 1999.

== Early life ==
Joyce Higel was born in Deshler, Nebraska, and graduated from Fairbury High School. She married Kenneth Hillman in 1954. She worked as the executive director of Platte Valley Council of Camp Fire, and was appointed the director of the Scottsbluff–Gering United Way in 1980. In 1981, when the Gering Police Department established the Alcohol and Drug Abuse Prevention Project, Hillman was appointed the director. She was appointed the executive director of the Scottsbluff-Gering United Chamber of Commerce in 1986, and later served as the executive vice president.

== Nebraska Legislature ==
In 1990, Hillman announced that she would run for the Nebraska Legislature from the 48th district, Incumbent Senator John Weihing ultimately declined to seek a second term. Hillman faced former Kimball County Attorney Tom Brower, sales manager Clinton Morrison, and retired repairman Max Schachter in the primary election. Hillman placed first in the primary, winning 41 percent of the vote, and advanced to the general election with Brower, who placed second with 30 percent. In the general election, Hillman defeated Brower with 54 percent of the vote. Hillman ran for re-election in 1994, and was elected to a second term unopposed.

Hillman ran for re-election to a third term in 1998, and was challenged by Gering City Councilman Adrian Smith. In the primary election, Smith placed first, receiving 56 percent to her 44 percent. In the general election, Smith ultimately defeated Hillman with 55 percent of the vote. Though the race was formally nonpartisan, Smith was a Republican, and Hillman, a Democrat, attributed her loss to heavy opposition from the Nebraska Republican Party and social conservatives.

== Post-legislative career ==
In 2001, Hillman married former District Court Judge Alfred Kortum and moved to Gering. Hillman-Kortum ran for the Gering City Council in 2004 in Ward I, challenging incumbent Councilman Dick Blaha. She defeated Blaha, winning with 56 percent of the vote, and was re-elected in 2008 over Dale Hauck.

Hillman-Kortum declined to seek re-election in 2012, and resigned from the City Council on September 10, 2012, following her relocation to Scottsbluff.

== Death ==
Hillman-Kortum died on November 20, 2019.
