= Modern Agriculture Caucus =

The Modern Agriculture Caucus is a caucus of U.S. legislators who support modern technology and economic practices in support of farming and agriculture. The caucus was formed in July 2025.

== Mission ==
According to founding member Representative Adrian Smith, the caucus will "champion policy which promotes cutting-edge technologies, stewardship of our natural resources, as well as the development and protection of U.S. agricultural innovation and intellectual property."

== Membership ==
In the 119th Congress, leaders of the Modern Agriculture Caucus include:

- Adrian Smith, (R‑NE‑3) (Chair)
- Erin Houchin, (R‑IN‑9) (Vice Chair of Precision Agriculture)
- Rob Bresnahan, (R‑PA‑8) (Vice Chair of Food Affordability)
- Frank Lucas, (R‑OK‑3) (Vice Chair of Biotechnology)
- Brad Finstad, (R‑MN‑1) (Vice Chair of Emerging Innovations)
- Vince Fong, (R‑CA‑20) (Vice Chair of Smart Irrigation)
- Tracey Mann, (R‑KS‑1) (Vice Chair of Automation & AI)

The rest of the caucus members in the 119th Congress include:

- Mariannette Miller-Meeks, (R‑IA‑1)
- Jim Baird, (R‑IN‑4)
- Don Bacon, (R‑NE‑2)
- Mike Flood, (R‑NE‑1)
- Michelle Fischbach, (R‑MN‑7)
- Tony Wied, (R‑WI‑8)
- Jeff Hurd, (R‑CO‑3)
- Ashley Hinson, (R‑IA‑2)
- David Valadao, (R‑CA‑22)
- Stephanie Bice, (R‑OK‑5)
- David Rouzer, (R‑NC‑7)
- Ann Wagner, (R‑MO‑2)
