= Adrian Smith (politician) =

American politician (born 1970)

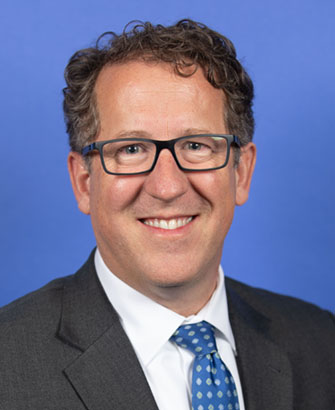
- Official portrait, 2022

Member of the U.S. House of Representatives from Nebraska's 3rd district
- Incumbent
- Assumed office January 3, 2007
- Preceded by: Tom Osborne

Member of the Nebraska Legislature from the 48th district
- In office January 6, 1999 – January 3, 2007
- Preceded by: Joyce Hillman-Kortum
- Succeeded by: John Harms

Personal details
- Born: Adrian Michael Smith; December 19, 1970 (age 55) Scottsbluff, Nebraska, U.S.
- Party: Republican
- Spouse: Andrea McDaniel (m. 2014)
- Children: 2
- Relatives: Steve McDaniel (father-in-law)
- Education: Liberty University (attended); University of Nebraska–Lincoln (BA)
- Website: House website Campaign website
- Smith's voice Smith supporting a bill on the tax status of victims of the 2019 Virginia Beach shooting. Recorded December 9, 2019

Adrian Michael Smith (born December 19, 1970) is an American politician serving as the U.S. representative for Nebraska's 3rd congressional district since 2007. A member of the Republican Party, he represented the 48th district in the Nebraska Legislature from 1999 to 2007. Smith is the dean of Nebraska's congressional delegation since 2022 following Jeff Fortenberry's resignation.

== Early life and education ==
Smith was born in Scottsbluff, Nebraska, and at a young age moved with his family to a rural neighborhood south of Gering, Nebraska. After graduating from Gering High School in 1989, he attended Liberty University. He transferred to the University of Nebraska–Lincoln midway through his second year of college, graduating in 1993. While a student at Nebraska, he interned in the Nebraska Governor's Office and, later, served as a legislative page in the Nebraska Legislature.

== Early career ==
Smith returned to Gering after college, and in 1994 began serving as a member of the Gering City Council. He has also worked in the private sector as a realtor and marketing specialist for the housing industry.

=== Nebraska Legislature ===
==== Elections ====
In 1998, Smith defeated incumbent State Legislator Joyce Hillman 55%–45%. In 2002, he was reelected to a second term unopposed. Since Nebraska voters passed Initiative Measure 415 in 2001, he was term-limited.

==== Committee assignments ====
Smith sat on the Natural Resources and Building Maintenance committees and was vice chair of the Transportation and Telecommunications committee. He served as vice chair of the Military and Veterans’ Affairs Committee and chaired the Four State Legislative Conference in 2001.

== U.S. House of Representatives ==
=== Elections ===
==== 2006 ====
Smith ran for the open seat in the 3rd district in the 2006 election. Three-term incumbent Tom Osborne gave up the seat to run for governor of Nebraska.

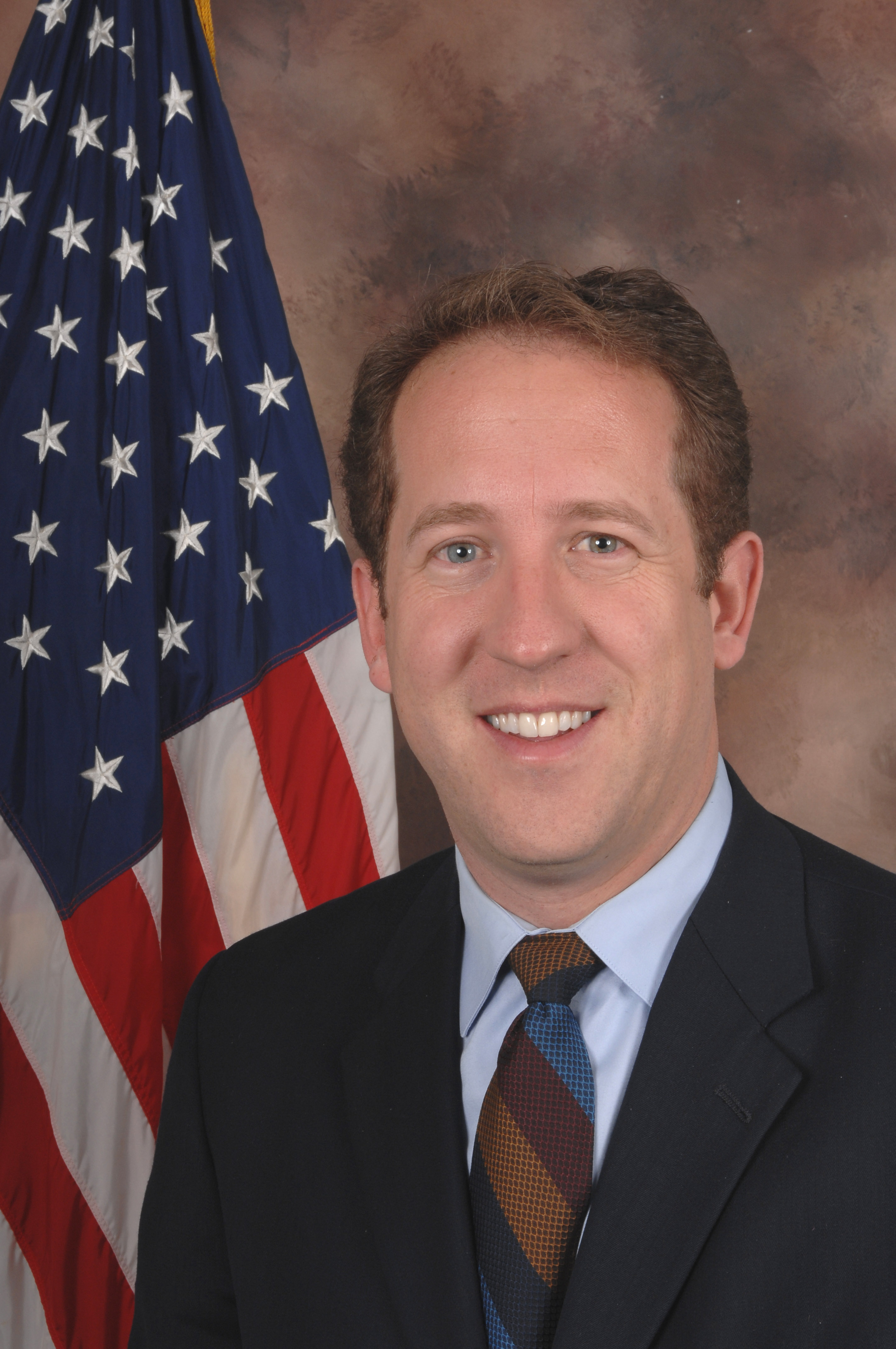
Smith in 2007 (110th Congress)

Smith won the Republican primary with 39% of the vote in a field of five candidates. He faced Democrat Scott Kleeb, a ranch hand and Yale graduate, in the general election.

About a third of the funding for Smith's campaign came from members of the Club for Growth, a fiscally conservative group that supports tax cuts, limited government, school choice, and eliminating agricultural subsidies and the US Department of Agriculture.

For a time, Smith was presumed to be a prohibitive favorite in this overwhelmingly Republican district. The 3rd is one of the most Republican districts in the nation; presidential and statewide candidates routinely win it with 70% or more of the vote. The 3rd is extremely difficult to campaign in and has few unifying influences. It covers nearly 65,000 square miles (170,000 km^{2}), two time zones, and 68.5 of Nebraska's 93 counties (one of which, Cherry County, is larger in area than the entire state of Connecticut). Despite that, Kleeb raised more money than any other Democrat had raised in the district in decades. Overall, the race was the most expensive in the district since it assumed its current configuration in 1963.

As the race become more competitive than initially expected, it received late national attention from the House campaign committees.

President George W. Bush made an appearance in the district two days before the election to campaign for Smith—a sign that the Republican party was concerned about its chances in what had long been presumed to be a very safe seat.

In the end, Smith won by 10 percentage points, taking 55% of the vote to Kleeb's 45%. This was the closest a Democrat had come to winning the district in 16 years; in 1990, Republican Bill Barrett defeated fellow Unicameral member Sandra K. Scofield by only 4,400 votes. It was also only the third time a Democrat had come reasonably close to winning this district in its current configuration; besides Barrett's narrow win in 1990, Virginia D. Smith won her first term by 737 votes in 1974.

Besides Bush's visit two days before the election, Smith likely rode the coattails of Governor Dave Heineman, who won many of the counties in the district with 80% or more of the vote in his bid for a full term.

==== 2008 ====
Smith won the primary with 87% of the vote. He was reelected to a second term, defeating Democratic nominee Jay Stoddard 77%–23%.

==== 2010 ====
Smith won the primary with 88% of the vote. He was reelected to a third term, defeating Democratic nominee Rebekah Davis 70%–18%.

==== 2012 ====
Smith won the Republican primary with 82% of the vote. He was reelected to a fourth term, defeating Democratic nominee Mark Sullivan 74%–26%.

==== 2014 ====
Smith won the Republican primary with 68% of the vote. He was reelected to a fifth term, defeating Democratic nominee Mark Sullivan a second time, 75%–25%.

==== 2016 ====
Smith was unopposed in the Republican primary and the general election.

==== 2018 ====
Smith was renominated with 66% of the vote. He was reelected to a seventh term, defeating Democratic nominee Paul Theobald 77%–23%.

==== 2020 ====
Smith won the Republican primary over four other candidates with 83% of the vote, and won the general election with 79% of the vote over Democratic nominee Mark Elworth Jr., a marijuana legalization activist. After he was reelected Smith voted to challenge the legitimacy of the 2020 presidential election.

==== 2022 ====
Smith won the Republican primary with 76% of the vote and was reelected over Democratic nominee David Else with 78% of the vote in the general election.

==== 2024 ====
Smith won the Republican primary with 74% of the vote and was reelected over Democratic nominee Daniel Ebers with 80% of the vote in the general election.

=== Committee assignments ===
- Committee on Ways and Means
  - Subcommittee on Trade (Chair)
  - Subcommittee on Social Security
  - Subcommittee on Health

=== Caucus memberships ===
- Congressional Rural Caucus (co-chair)
- Modern Agriculture Caucus (chair)
- Tea Party Caucus
- Congressional Constitution Caucus
- Congressional Coalition on Adoption
- Congressional Western Caucus

U.S. House of Representatives
Preceded by Tom Osborne	Member of the U.S. House of Representatives from Nebraska's 3rd congressional district 2007–present	Incumbent
U.S. order of precedence (ceremonial)
Preceded by Jim Jordan	United States representatives by seniority 61st	Succeeded by Bob Latta
