= Rocky Ford PK–12 =

Location
- 101 Meloneer Drive; Rocky Ford, Colorado 81067; United States
- Coordinates: 38°2′34″N 103°44′7″W

Information
- School type: Public school
- School district: Rocky Ford R-2
- NCES District ID: 0806270
- Superintendent: Kermit Snyder
- CEEB code: 061235
- NCES School ID: 080627001104; 080627001101; 080627001103
- Elementary Principal: Patti Aldea
- Secondary Principal: Rita Robinson
- Teaching staff: 53.59 (on an FTE basis)
- Grades: P–12
- Gender: Coeducational
- Enrollment: 616 (2023–24)
- Student to teacher ratio: 11.49
- Campus type: Rural, Distant
- Colors: Red and yellow
- Athletics conference: Santa Fe
- Mascot: Meloneer
- Yearbook: Le Cantaloupe
- Website: rockyfordk12.org

Rocky Ford PK–12 is a comprehensive public school in Rocky Ford, Colorado. After the consolidation of the district's elementary schools with the junior/senior high school, Rocky Ford PK–12 is the only school in the Rocky Ford School District, a small rural school district which serves north central Otero County, including Rocky Ford and the unincorporated community of Hawley.

== History ==
The first school in Rocky Ford was built in 1877.

In 2021, the Rocky Ford School District received a Building Excellent Schools Today (BEST) grant worth $40 million for refurbishing the existing junior/senior high school building and building a PK–8 addition. The project was completed in 2024, with a ribbon-cutting ceremony held on October 24.

== Enrollment ==
Before the consolidation of the district into a single school, the Rocky Ford School District operated three schools across the town. Washington Primary School, which served preschool through second grade, had 152 students in the 2023–24 school year. Jefferson Intermediate School, which served students in the third through sixth grades, had 199 students that year, and Rocky Ford Junior/Senior High School, which served seventh through twelfth graders, had 265 students.

== Extracurriculars ==
=== Athletics ===
The Meloneer, the school's mascot

Rocky Ford competes at the high school level in the Santa Fe league of the Colorado High School Activities Association. Their mascot is the meloneer, an anthropomorphic watermelon, and the school colors are red and yellow.
