= National Register of Historic Places listings in White County, Illinois =

Location of White County in Illinois

This is a list of the National Register of Historic Places listings in White County, Illinois.

This is intended to be a complete list of the properties and districts on the National Register of Historic Places in White County, Illinois, United States. Latitude and longitude coordinates are provided for many National Register properties and districts; these locations may be seen together in a map.

There are 11 properties and districts listed on the National Register in the county.

This National Park Service list is complete through NPS recent listings posted March 21, 2025.

== Current listings ==
	Name on the Register	Image	Date listed	Location	City or town	Description
1	Bieker-Wilson Village Site	Bieker-Wilson Village Site	November 21, 1978 (#78001197)	Sandy Slough, southeast of the junction of County Road 300N and 1650E; 37°55′02″N 88°04′34″W	New Haven	
2	Carmi Chapter House	Carmi Chapter House	November 28, 1980 (#80001416)	604 W. Main St. 38°05′07″N 88°10′06″W	Carmi	
3	William W. Gray House	William W. Gray House	February 13, 1992 (#92000049)	119 N. Court St. 38°15′31″N 87°59′46″W	Grayville	Designed by architect George Franklin Barber
4	L. Haas Store	L. Haas Store	February 4, 1994 (#94000026)	219 E. Main St. 38°05′26″N 88°09′34″W	Carmi	
5	Harmony Way Bridge	Harmony Way Bridge	October 3, 2007 (#07001030)	Indiana State Road 66/Illinois Route 14; 38°07′52″N 87°56′32″W	Crossville	Extends into Posey County, Indiana
6	Hubele Mounds and Village Site	Hubele Mounds and Village Site	August 25, 1978 (#78001196)	East of the junction of County Roads 950N and 1900E; 38°01′00″N 88°01′56″W	Maunie	
7	Old Morrison Mill	Old Morrison Mill	July 11, 1984 (#84001169)	Off Liberty Rd. 38°15′08″N 88°15′29″W	Burnt Prairie	
8	Ratcliff Inn	Ratcliff Inn	June 4, 1973 (#73000719)	214 E. Main St. 38°05′25″N 88°09′33″W	Carmi	
9	Robinson-Stewart House	Robinson-Stewart House	August 17, 1973 (#73000720)	110 S. Main Cross St. 38°05′25″N 88°09′31″W	Carmi	
10	James Robert Williams House	James Robert Williams House	January 29, 1987 (#86003716)	310 E. Main St. 38°05′27″N 88°09′29″W	Carmi	Designed by George Franklin Barber
11	Wilson Mounds and Village Site	Wilson Mounds and Village Site	November 16, 1977 (#77000491)	Within and surrounding the Marshall Ferry Cemetery at Rising Sun; 37°59′57″N 88°01′55″W	Maunie	

== See also ==
- List of National Historic Landmarks in Illinois
- National Register of Historic Places listings in Illinois
