= Emma Township, White County, Illinois =

Emma Township
- Township

- Location of Illinois in the United States
- Coordinates: 37°58′32″N 88°05′06″W
- Country: United States
- State: Illinois
- County: White
- Organized: November 7, 1871

Area
  - Total: 66.01 sq mi (171.0 km^{2})
  - Land: 63.32 sq mi (164.0 km^{2})
  - Water: 2.69 sq mi (7.0 km^{2})
- Elevation: 358 ft (109 m)

Population (2010)
  - Estimate (2016): 377
- Time zone: UTC-6 (CST)
  - Summer (DST): UTC-5 (CDT)
- ZIP code: XXXXX
- Area code: 618
- FIPS code: 17-193-24088

Emma Township is located in White County, Illinois. As of the 2010 census, its population was 387 and it contained 235 housing units.

Three significant archaeological sites are located in the township: the Hubele Mounds and Village Site southeast of Maunie; the Wilson Mounds and Village Site at Rising Sun; and the Bieker-Wilson Village Site east of New Haven.

== Geography ==
According to the 2010 census, the township has a total area of 66.01 square miles (171.0 km^{2}), of which 63.32 square miles (164.0 km^{2}) (or 95.92%) is land and 2.69 square miles (7.0 km^{2}) (or 4.08%) is water.

== Demographics ==
Historical population
Census	Pop.	Note	%±
2016 (est.)	377
U.S. Decennial Census
