= Herald, Illinois =

- Unincorporated community
- Location within Illinois Location within the United States
- Coordinates: 37°57′59″N 88°10′53″W
- Country: United States
- State: Illinois
- County: White
- Elevation: 423 ft (129 m)
- Time zone: UTC-6 (Central (CST))
  - Summer (DST): UTC-5 (CDT)
- Area code: 618
- GNIS feature ID: 410088

Herald is an unincorporated community in Heralds Prairie Township, White County, Illinois, United States. Herald is located on County Route 8, 8.5 miles (13.7 km) south of Carmi. Herald had a post office, which opened on September 13, 1886, and closed on April 10, 2004.
