= Hubele Mounds and Village Site =

Archaeological site in Illinois, United States

- U.S. National Register of Historic Places
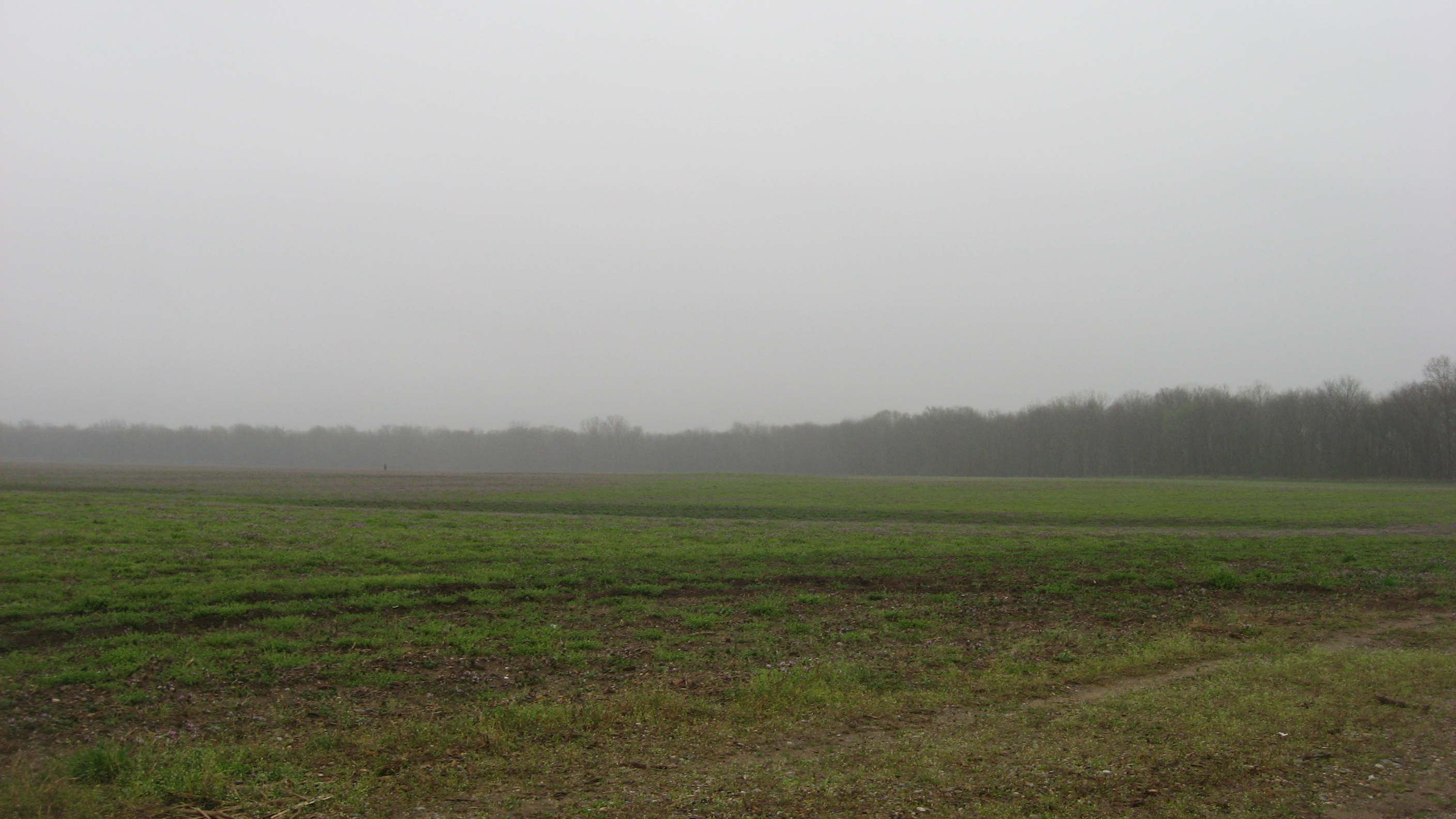
- Overview of the site from the west

- Location within Illinois Location within the United States
- Location: East of the junction of County Roads 950N and 1900E, southeast of Maunie, Illinois
- Coordinates: 38°1′0″N 88°1′56″W
- Area: 60 acres (24 ha)
- NRHP reference No.: 78001196
- Added to NRHP: August 25, 1978

The Hubele Mounds and Village Site are an archaeological site in the southeastern part of the U.S. state of Illinois. Located near the community of Maunie in White County, the site has received recognition from the federal government because of its archaeological value. Due to the lack of recent excavations, the site's dates of habitation are debated, ranging from 400 BC in some estimates to AD 1000 in others, but all agree on the site's significance to understanding the prehistory of the region.

== Geography ==
Hubele lies approximately 400 metres (1,300 ft) west of the Wabash River, 17 miles (27 km) above its confluence with the Ohio River, on land only minimally higher than the riverbank; the site may once have been a riverside sandbar. The site forms part of massive farm fields along the river; a levee on the eastern edge protects the site from flooding, and a line of trees marks the site's northern edge. Besides the levee, which may sit atop part of the site, historical disturbances to the site have included the construction of a road on the southern edge and the placement of a drainage ditch; however, all of these influences have disturbed less than one-sixth of the site.

== Features ==
Originally, the site was distinguished by a group of seven earthworks, small mounds placed in a north–south line. None of the mounds have survived intact to the present; two were excavated by archaeologists from the Illinois State Museum, and the other five have been worn down by repeated plowing, leaving even the highest less than 4 feet (1.2 m) tall. Located east of the mounds, the village site has yielded evidence of numerous features, including postholes, trash pits, and fire pits; many of these have been uncovered by routine plowing.

== Excavation ==
The Illinois State Museum sponsored a two-part excavation project at Hubele in 1950; archaeologists dug a pair of test trenches (each measuring 10 by 20 feet (3.0 m × 6.1 m)) in the village area and removed two of the mounds, which were found to have been previously disturbed. Both loci produced various types of artifacts: surface collection in the village found projectile points, pottery, knives and flakes of flint, and bones and shells, while the soil under the mound was found to contain a distinctive pipestone pipe, additional potsherds, and projectile points from the prolific flint quarries of Harrison County, Indiana. More than two thousand grog-tempered sherds were found in the test trenches, including some that bore no markings at all; it is uncertain whether the plain sherds were originally plain or if they were decorated pieces that had lost their original markings.

== Cultural affiliation ==
Disputes have arisen over the proper interpretation of pottery from Hubele. The original State Museum researchers identified the villagers as Hopewellian peoples from the Middle Woodland period, as the majority of sherds were of the Hopewellian style known as Crab Orchard; in the southern Wabash Valley, this date translates to a period from approximately 400 BC to AD 400. It is one of just four mound sites in southern Illinois that is generally considered to be Hopewellian, along with the nearby Wilson Mounds and Village Site, the Rutherford Site at the mouth of the Saline River, and the Twenhafel Site near the Mississippi River. However, its date, like those of the other three, is uncertain, because no substantial work has been conducted at Hubele since radiocarbon dating became practical. Howard Winters of the State Museum rejected the previous studies' view of the latest occupation of the site; a 1963 archaeological survey under his leadership suggested that Hubele was affiliated with the Duffy complex. If Hubele were related to the Duffy people, its location would be crucial: only three sites have conclusively been identified as Duffy, and all lie within ten miles of the mouth of the Wabash, so Hubele would represent the northernmost known location of the complex, which inhabited the region circa AD 1000 during the transition out of the Woodland period under Mississippian influence. Yet later studies suggested a connection with other late Hopewellian complexes, such as the Havana Hopewell and the people of the Mann site in far southwestern Indiana. Consequently, solid identification of the site as Duffy-related would raise the site's importance even higher by demonstrating its occupation over many centuries, as well as making it just the fourth site so to be identified, after the type site, the Duffy site in Gallatin County, and the Pepper and Little Chain sites in White County. Even if further research disproves the concept of a Duffy connection, Hubele will remain significant; its connection to the nearby Hopewellian Wilson Mounds at Rising Sun is undisputed, so it appears to be one of the most important villages associated with the mound group.

== Preservation ==
In August 1978, the Hubele site was listed on the National Register of Historic Places, qualifying because of its archaeological significance. The landmark's boundaries encompassed six contributing properties (the five mounds and the site as a whole) over 60 acres (24 ha) of land. It is one of eleven National Register-listed locations in White County, along with the Wilson and Bieker-Wilson archaeological sites.

== See also ==
- List of archaeological sites on the National Register of Historic Places in Illinois
