= Mill Shoals, Illinois =

Mill Shoals
- Village
- Village of Mill Shoals
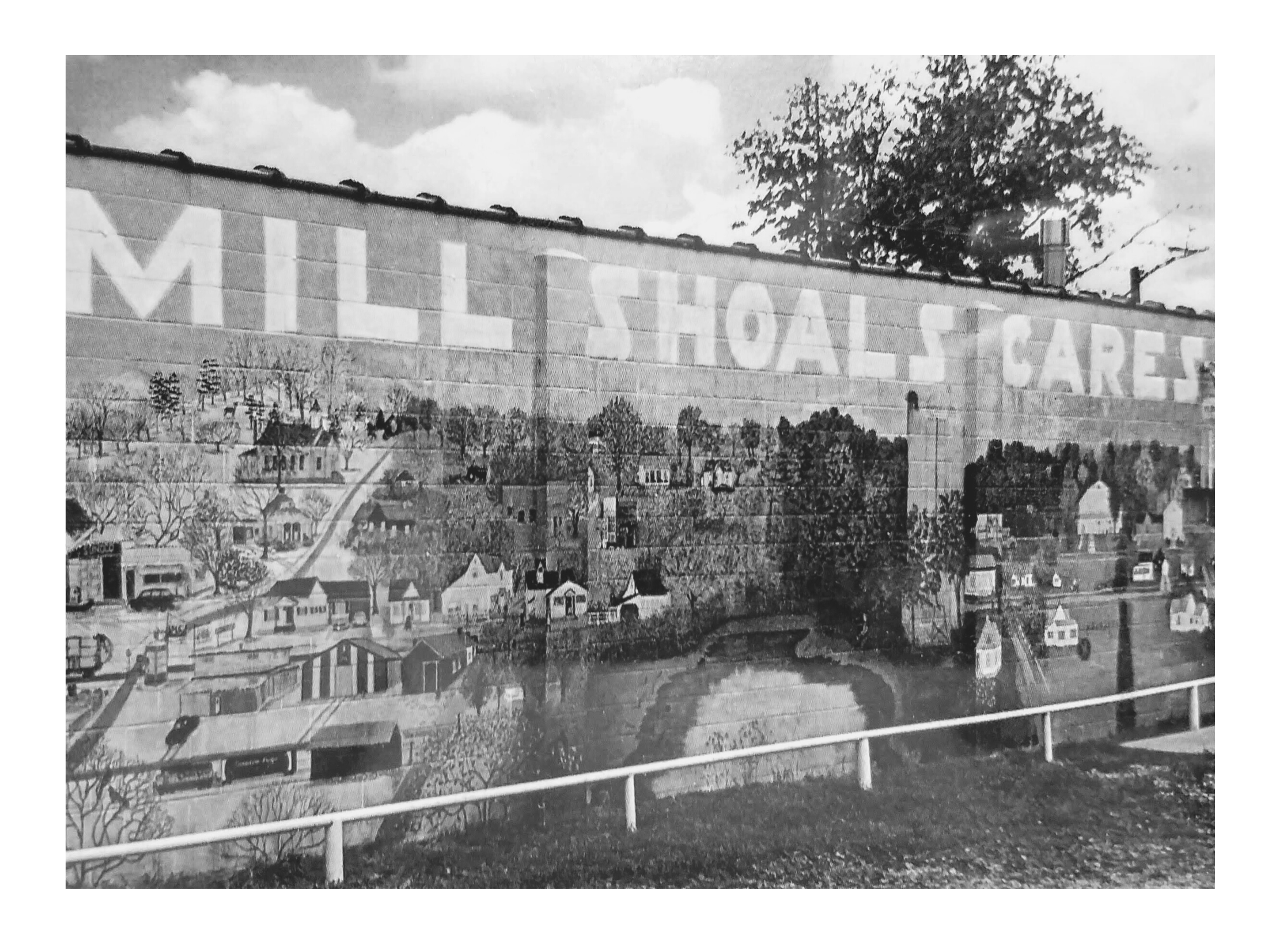
- Village of Mill Shoals U.S. Post Office Mural

- Location of Mill Shoals in Wayne County, Illinois.
- Coordinates: 38°15′10″N 88°20′47″W
- Country: United States
- State: Illinois
- County: White
- Founded: 1896
- Named for: Mill Shoals takes its name from the water mill built by William Weed in 1835 on the shoals of the Skillet Fork River at the western boundary of the community.
- Village: Village of Mill Shoals Town House Building

Government
  - Type: Mayor-Board Government
  - Body: Village of Mill Shoals Board
  - Mayor: Whit McDowell

Area
  - Total: 0.77 sq mi (1.99 km^{2})
  - Land: 0.77 sq mi (1.99 km^{2})
  - Water: 0 sq mi (0.00 km^{2})
- Elevation: 390 ft (120 m)

Population (2020)
  - Total: 176
  - Density: 229/sq mi (88.4/km^{2})
- Time zone: UTC-6 (CST)
  - Summer (DST): UTC-5 (CDT)
- ZIP code: 62862
- Area code: 618
- FIPS code: 17-49347
- GNIS ID: 2399348

Mill Shoals is a village in Wayne and White counties in the U.S. State of Illinois. The population was 235 at the 2000 census, down to 176 at the 2020 census. In Fall 2022, Drew Lane Consultants LLC conducted a village-wide survey that totaled population at 157. The Village of Mill Shoals is located 4 hours and 14 minutes driving directly south of the City of Chicago (with no traffic), 58 minutes driving directly northwest of Evansville, Indiana, 2 hours and 9 minutes driving directly west of Louisville, Kentucky, and 1 hour and 42 minutes directly east of St. Louis, Missouri. The Village is home to a U.S. Post Office, community center, private grain elevator, and two churches. Residents are active members of the 4-H, FFA, and Ruritans.

== History ==
The first Euro-American settlers, primarily of Scotch-Irish descent, came to White County, Illinois between 1807 and 1809. The first settlements were near the Little Wabash River and Big Prairie, one of the numerous prairies in the county. Many came through the land office at Shawneetown, which was a port for flatboats which traveled the Ohio River. The second half of the 19th century saw the establishment of the towns of Norris City, Springerton including Mill Shoals. Once the home of a thriving barrel-making industry which depleted the nearby virgin forests Mill Shoals had primarily been an agriculture village until 1939 when oil was discovered in the area. In the early 1970s the oil industry declined steeply and thus returned Mill Shoals to its agricultural roots.

The town retains the authentic WPA Post office mural.

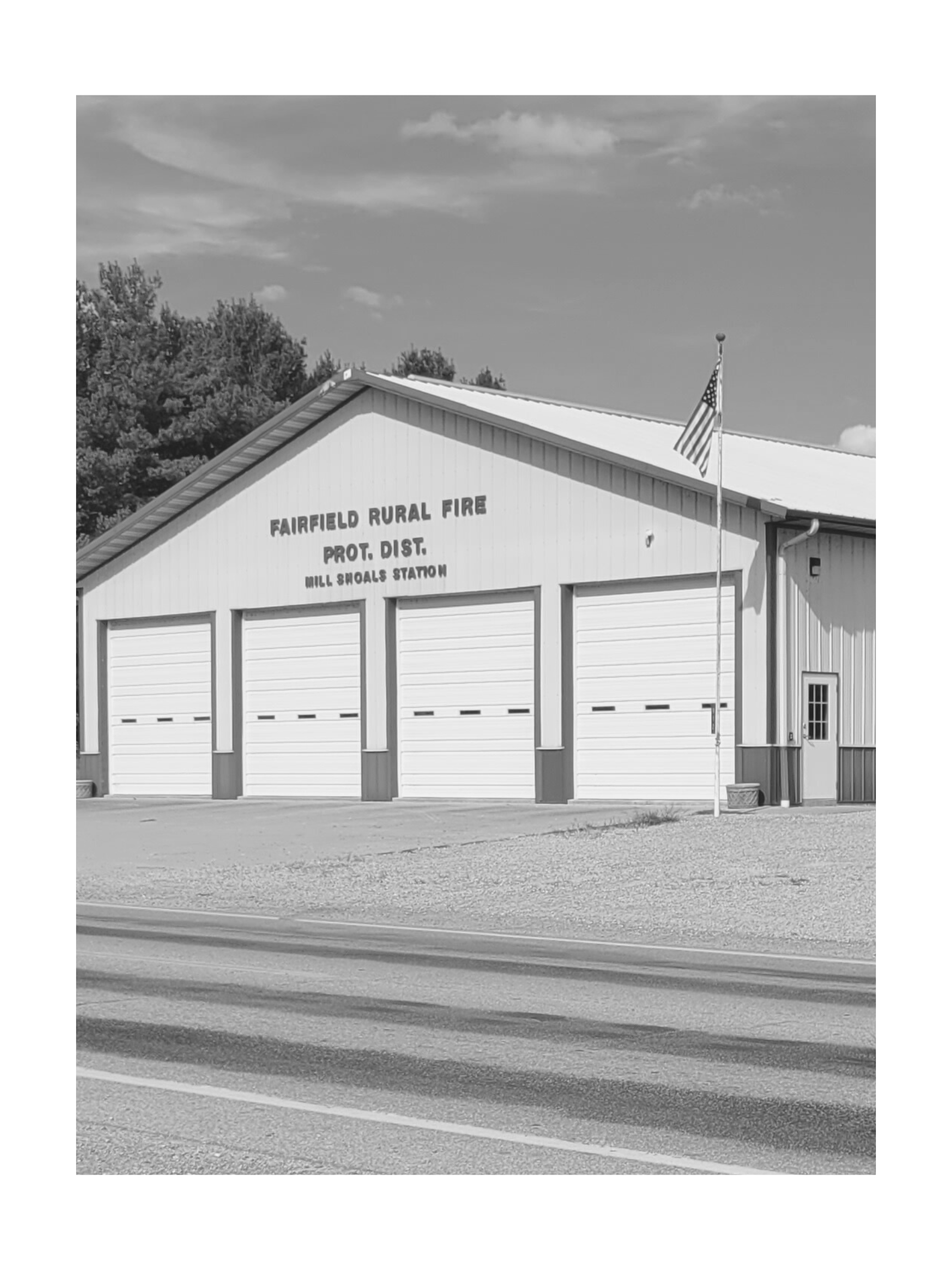
Village of Mill Shoals, Illinois, Fairfield Rural Fire Department Branch

=== A Portrait of the Village of Mill Shoals in 1978 ===
From the Institute of Cultural Affairs 1978 Human Development Project Report:

"Mill Shoals is a representative mid-American small town with a population of 314 people situated in White County in southern Illinois. It is one of many secluded villages in the hills surrounded by fertile river bottomlands that make up the Wabash Meadows. U. S. Highway 45 passes north-south through the center of town, and a spur of the Baltimore and Ohio Railroad, built in 1870, brings two freight trains weekly. A county road connects Mill Shoals with Burnt Prairie five miles east along the old stagecoach trail that once connected Ohio River traffic from Shawneetown to central Illinois."

Incorporated in 1872, Mill Shoals takes its name from the water mill built by William Weed in 1835 on the shoals of the Skillet Fork River at the western boundary of the community. The town is governed by an elected mayor and council, who were responsible for a water supply system and a new grade school in 1965.

Mill Shoals sometimes refers to itself as the key ring capital of the world, an outgrowth of the ring binder, invented by Henry T. Adams of Mill Shoals in 1902, Besides the Adams Manufacturing Company is the Behimer and Kissner Grain Elevator and the more recent Grace Agricultural Products (chemical fertilizers). In addition there is a post office, a hardware store that doubles as an ice manufacturing source for the area, a grocery store, cafe, two service stations, two beauty shops, several private contractors, a funeral parlor, and five churches.

Mill Shoals has a high percentage of retired senior citizens. Most of the citizens who are employed work in nearby Fairfield. The town began informally between 1808 and 1835 as various groups of settlers camped on the high ground in the "drowned lands". Unremitting floods, plus major fires in 1900 and 1924 devastated the river settlement.

==== Railroad ====
During the first quarter of the 20th Century Mill Shoals. gradually moved east of the railroad tracks, away from the river. Thus Mill Shoals shifted from a 19th Century milling settlement on the shoals to a 20th Century way-station along the highway. Powerful but transitory economic resources have involved Mill Shoals in booms of productivity followed by periods of depression, depletion of strength and dispersion of employment.

==== Mill and Village Expansion ====
The first boom occurred with the arrival of the Hawkins and Smith Stave Mill in 1892. By the turn of the century the population had mushroomed to 1,500, and the town included a flour mill, saw mill, lumber factory, tile factory, canning factory, grain elevator, two hotels, opera house, saloon, pool room, drug store, hardware store, restaurant, two groceries, barber shop, two general stores, two doctors and a livery stable. A bank was first established in 1903, and in 1906 a Farmers' Mutual Benefit Association was formed to raise and market livestock. Besides this, Mill Shoals had a weekly newspaper, sidewalks, and obtained electric lighting before Fairfield, with the departure of the stave mill in 1909 a ten-year lull followed which is remembered by old-timers primarily for its great reunions and travelling circus. The Egyptian Tie and Timber Company sustained the economy for the decade of the 20's as the lumbering business boomed.

==== 1930s-1940s Oil Boom ====
The devastation of the depression was softened only by the oil boom from 1938 to the end of World War II. A long period of economic neglect has seen the growth of welfare dependency and the recent loss of the high school [Mills Prairie, on the Eastern outskirts of Mill Shoals] which had sustained the social life of Mill Shoals since it became a four-year school in 1945. As the nation becomes more dependent on local energy sources, Mill Shoals could well be near the center of a potential coal boom. The question for this community that has held on so tenaciously through boom times and hard times is how it can tie in to another boom and at the same time build a lasting foundation for continuous economic self-sufficiency in the future.

== Geography ==
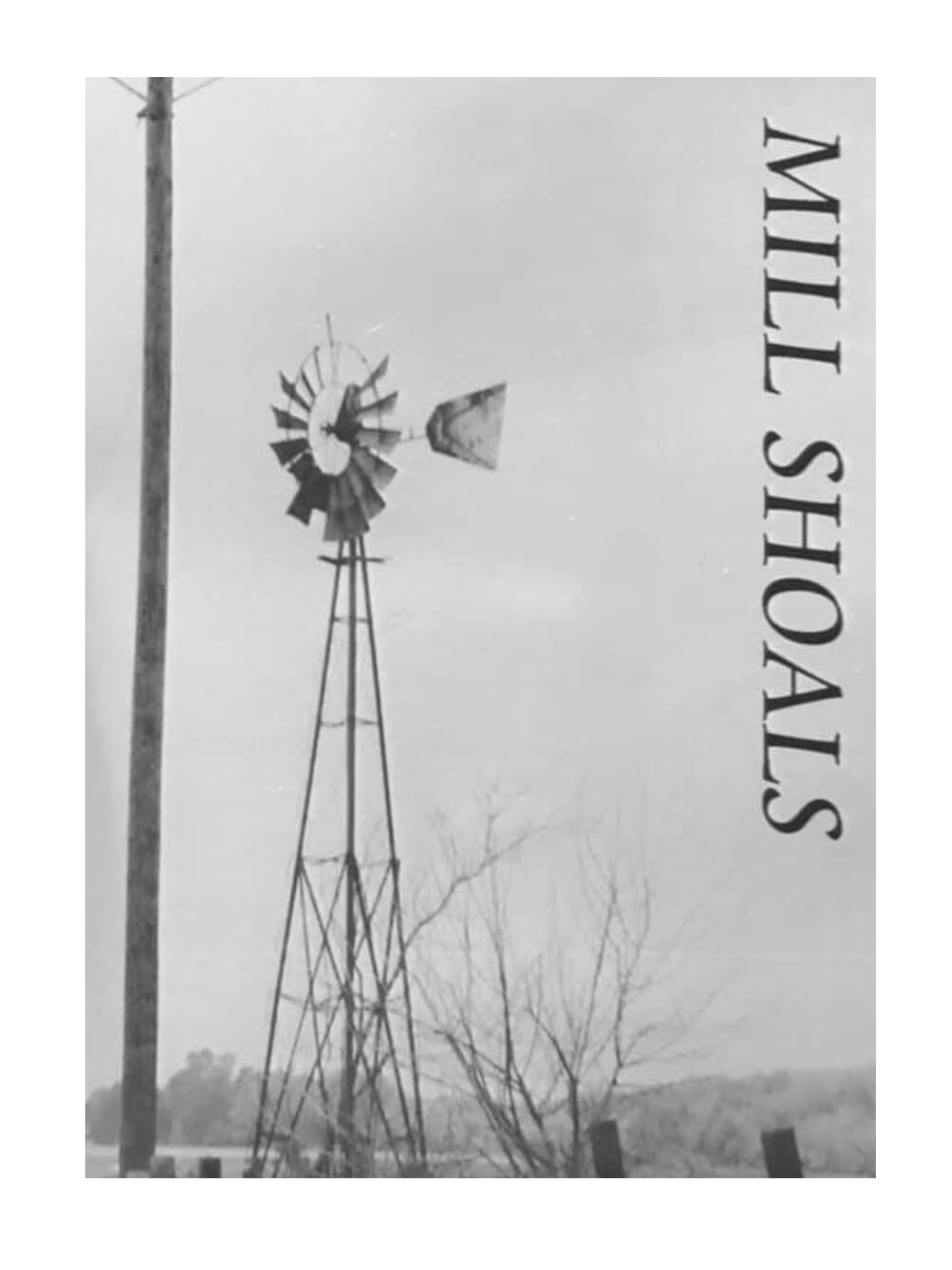
1950s Village of Mill Shoals, Illinois Postcard Featuring a Fencerow and Windmill

According to the 2010 census, Mill Shoals has a total area of 0.79 square miles (2.05 km^{2}), all land.

Mill Shoals is located in Illinois, two-thirds of the way from St. Louis, Missouri, to Evansville, Indiana, at the juncture of Interstate 64 and U.S. Highway 45.

=== Local Geography ===
"Inside a 200 mile radius of Mill Shoals is a unique geographical and historical area described as the Mid-America Basin. It was here, 175,000 years ago, that the Illinoian Glacier withdrew, leaving two great drainage systems in its wake. On the west side of the Basin the Illinois and Missouri Rivers join the Mississippi River; on the east side the Wabash and Tennessee Rivers join the Ohio River. The systems meet at Cairo, Illinois to begin a long journey through the Gulf Coastal Plain. The retreating glacier left rich mineral deposits of oil, coal, and fluorite to await 20th Century exploitation, and ground out a fine top-soil that was to yield vast timber areas of maple, ash, and oak, as well as fertile fields of wheat, corn, barley, and soybeans, As early as 15,000 B. C., pre-historic Indian peoples hunted the mammoths that roamed the area and eventually developed a series of substantial civilizations of the mounds and of the woodlands, climaxing in the Illini Confederation of the 17th and 18th Centuries. In the 18th Century, French and English explorers competed for these lands beginning with Marquette and Joliet in 1673 and ending with the American conquest under George Rogers Clark in 1778, when the Province of Virginia claimed the territory west to the Mississippi River. The next quarter century saw the advent of frontiersmen such as Daniel Boone paving the way for the great western migration. After the War of 1812, the pioneers poured into the Basin along the Cumberland Highway (now U. S. 40) through Terre Haute, Indiana, on the north side of the Basin. They came down the Ohio River from Cincinnati and Louisville, and from Tennessee and Kentucky across the Ohio at Shawneetown, just below the Wabash junction. Thus the Basin became the great staging area that was to funnel settlers through the gate of St. Louis into the far West. Subsequently, the area became the commercial, cultural, and political center for the new frontier--until the construction of the Illinois-Michigan Canal in 1848 shifted the focus northward to Chicago. It was during this time that another famous trail-blazer made his way through the area, giving his name to the nearby Lincoln Heritage Trail. Significant among early 19th Century settlements were experiments in comprehensive self-sufficient communities such as Albion, Illinois, and New Harmony, Indiana, both in the Mill Shoals vicinity. With the advent of the Mill Shoals Human Development Project the Mid-American Basin once again becomes a staging area for the nation's effort to pioneer authentic local community."

From the 1978 Village Report by the Institute of Cultural Affairs:

"The area is in the northwest corner of White County, Illinois, thirty miles north of Carmi; the county seat, and 160 miles southeast of the state capital, Springfield, Illinois. Evansville, Indiana, is the nearest large city, sixty miles east. The project area is bounded on the north by the county line and on the west by the Skillet Fork River; it extends approximately one mile south and one and one-half miles east from these boundaries. U. S. Highway 45 runs north and south through the town, and Interstate 64, a major east-west route, is two miles north of town. Approximately twenty per cent of the land is farmed (soy-bean and corn), thirty per cent is developed, and fifty per cent is unused. Thirty acres on the southeast edge of town is municipally owned. Annual flooding occurs over the western third of the project area in the flood plain. Of the 314 persons residing in the town of Mill Shoals, seventy-five are retired persons and 107 are dependent children. Educational facilities for the community are the elementary school in Mill Shoals and the high school in Fairfield. nine miles north on Highway 45. Fairfield also serves as the major commercial center used by Mill Shoals residents."

=== Weather ===
Mill Shoals, Illinois experiences a humid continental climate, characterized by hot summers and cold winters. The average temperature in the summer months of June to August ranges from 70 °F to 85 °F, while in the winter months of December to February, it drops to around 20 °F to 35 °F. The town also receives a moderate amount of precipitation throughout the year, with the wettest months being May and June. Additionally, Mill Shoals is located in an area that is prone to severe thunderstorms and tornadoes during the spring and summer months. It is important for residents and visitors to stay informed about weather conditions and take necessary precautions to stay safe during severe weather events.

== Demographics ==
Historical population
Census	Pop.	Note	%±
1880	25		—
1890	221		784.0%
1900	669		202.7%
1910	700		4.6%
1920	356		−49.1%
1930	465		30.6%
1940	537		15.5%
1950	417		−22.3%
1960	322		−22.8%
1970	292		−9.3%
1980	333		14.0%
1990	247		−25.8%
2000	235		−4.9%
2010	215		−8.5%
2020	176	U.S. Census Bureau	−18.1%
U.S. Decennial Census

At the 2020 census, there were 176 people, a median household income of $51,731, 4.3% of the population held a bachelor's degree or Higher, 51% were employed, 97 total housing units, 3.5% without healthcare coverage, 70 families residing in the village, and 35 as the median age, 39 as the median age in Illinois.

=== 2020 Census Ancestry ===
2.9% of the Village residents have Italian Ancestry compared to the 5.3% of the state of Illinois. Ancestry of the Village of Mill Shoals is 9.8% English, 38.2% German, 20.8% Irish, 2.9% Italian, 1.2% Norwegian, 11.6% Polish, 0% Scottish, 0% Subs-saharan Africa, and 0% French.

=== 2020 Census Language Spoken at Home ===
0% language other than English is spoken at home, compared to 23.3% in the state of Illinois.

=== 2020 Census Native and Foreign Born ===
0% of the population of Mill Shoals is foreign born, compared to 14.2% in the state of Illinois.

=== 2020 Census Older Population ===
30.1% of Mill Shoals residents are 65 years and older, compared to 16.6% of the state of Illinois. 19.1% are 65 to 74 years, 9.8% are 75 to 84 years, and 1.2% are 85 years and over.

2020 Census Mobility

3% of residents moved from a different state in the last year, compared to 1.6% in the state of Illinois

=== 2020 Census Veterans ===
9.2% of residents are veterans, compared to 5% in the state of Illinois. All Mill Shoals veterans are male.

=== 2020 Census Income and Earning & Poverty ===
$51,731 is the median household income, compared to $72,205 in the state of Illinois. 8.1% of residents are in poverty, compared to 12.1% in poverty for the state of Illinois. 14.8% of Mill Shoals Village poverty are residents under 18 years old, 6% ages 18 to 64, and 3.8% 65 years and over.

=== 2020 Census Education ===
4.3% hold a bachelor's degree or higher, 37.1% hold a bachelor's degree or higher in the state of Illinois. 29.9% of the Village hold a high school or equivalent degree, 35% have some college and no degree, 22% hold an associate degree, and 4.3% hold a bachelor's degree.

=== 2000 Census ===
As of the 2000 census, there were 235 people, 111 households, and 72 families residing in the village. The population density was 299.9 inhabitants per square mile (115.8/km^{2}). There were 133 housing units at an average density of 169.8 per square mile (65.6/km^{2}). The racial makeup of the village was 99.57% White, and 0.43% from two or more races.

There were 111 households, out of which 24.3% had children under the age of 18 living with them, 57.7% were married couples living together, 5.4% had a female householder with no husband present, and 35.1% were non-families. 33.3% of all households were made up of individuals, and 16.2% had someone living alone who was 65 years of age or older. The average household size was 2.12 and the average family size was 2.67.

In the village, the population was spread out, with 20.0% under the age of 18, 8.1% from 18 to 24, 18.7% from 25 to 44, 33.6% from 45 to 64, and 19.6% who were 65 years of age or older. The median age was 48 years. For every 100 females, there were 92.6 males. For every 100 females age 18 and over, there were 93.8 males.

The median income for a household in the village was $27,292, and the median income for a family was $33,750. Males had a median income of $34,375 versus $20,000 for females. The per capita income for the village was $14,355. About 5.7% of families and 9.9% of the population were below the poverty line, including 17.6% of those under the age of eighteen and 11.4% of those 65 or over.

== Economy ==
Agriculture plays a significant role in the economy of Mill Shoals, Illinois, and the surrounding area. The town is located in a region that is known for its fertile soil, making it an ideal location for farming. The primary crops grown in the area include corn, soybeans, and wheat. In addition to crop production, the area is also home to several livestock farms, including beef and dairy cattle, pigs, and poultry. These farms not only provide food for the local community but also contribute to the economy through job creation and the sale of agricultural products. Overall, agriculture is a vital part of Mill Shoals' economy and way of life.

== Infrastructure ==
Public facilities include a post office, the elementary school, a combination town hall and fire station. and a new town recreation park under construction. The 176 housing units in Mill Shoals are mainly small, single family dwellings, nearly one fourth of which are mobile homes. Fifty-five per cent of the housing was judged sound in a 1976 survey. At that time, about five per cent of the units were vacant, several of which could be restored for community projects.

The city water is piped into a majority of the homes, while others have pressurized cisterns.

Sewage is processed in septic tanks, many of which are sub-standard. Drainage for the considerable overflow is through open ditches, prohibiting normal laundry activity within the community and occasioning a serious health hazard.

Gas heating and electricity are found in most homes, but telephones are more scarce.

Four of the five churches serving the area are located in Mill Shoals.
