= Prairie Township, Illinois =

Prairie Township, Illinois may refer to one of the following townships:

== Homonyms ==
- Prairie Township, Crawford County, Illinois
- Prairie Township, Edgar County, Illinois
- Prairie Township, Hancock County, Illinois
- Prairie Township, Shelby County, Illinois

== Include "Prairie" in the name ==
- Belle Prairie Township, Livingston County, Illinois
- Buffalo Prairie Township, Rock Island County, Illinois
- Burnt Prairie Township, White County, Illinois
- Elk Prairie Township, Jefferson County, Illinois
- Grand Prairie Township, Jefferson County, Illinois
- Heralds Prairie Township, White County, Illinois
- Indian Prairie Township, Wayne County, Illinois
- Knights Prairie Township, Hamilton County, Illinois
- La Prairie Township, Marshall County, Illinois
- Moore’s Prairie Township, Jefferson County, Illinois
- Prairie City Township, McDonough County, Illinois
- Prairie Creek Township, Logan County, Illinois
- Prairie du Long Township, St. Clair County, Illinois
- Prairie Green Township, Iroquois County, Illinois
- Prairieton Township, Christian County, Illinois
- Sand Prairie Township, Tazewell County, Illinois

== See also ==
- Prairie Township (disambiguation)
