= The Carmi Times =

Newspaper in Carmi, Illinois

- Type: Daily newspaper
- Owner: USA Today Co.
- Founded: December 22, 1950
- Headquarters: 323 East Main Street, Carmi, Illinois 62821, United States
- OCLC number: 15118722
- Website: carmitimes.com

The Carmi Times was an American daily newspaper published in Carmi, Illinois. In 1987, the paper was acquired by Hollinger. Former owner GateHouse Media purchased roughly 160 daily and weekly newspapers from Hollinger in 1997.

The daily newspaper covers the White County communities of Carmi, Grayville and Norris City. GateHouse also publishes a Weekly Times in Carmi, and the Norris City Banner weekly.
