= Phillips Township =

Phillips Township may refer to one of the following places:

== Canada ==
- Phillips Township, Kenora District, Ontario

== United States ==
- Phillips Township, White County, Illinois
- Phillips Township, Coal County, Oklahoma

== See also ==
- Phillips (disambiguation)
