= Haas Building (disambiguation) =

Haas Building may refer to the Haas Building (Los Angeles) and if not then maybe you’re looking for:

in the United States

(by state then city)

- Haas Candy Factory, San Francisco, California, listed on the NRHP in San Francisco
- L. Haas Store, Carmi, Illinois, listed on the NRHP in White County
- Elias Haas Building, St. Louis, Missouri, listed on the NRHP in St. Louis
- Haas Building (St. Louis, Missouri), listed on the NRHP in St. Louis
- Rohm and Haas Corporate Headquarters, Philadelphia, Pennsylvania, NRHP-listed
