= Crossville =

Crossville is the name of the following towns in the United States:

- Crossville, Alabama
- Crossville, Illinois
- Crossville, Tennessee
