= Emma, Illinois =

- Unincorporated community
- Location within Illinois Location within the United States
- Coordinates: 37°58′29″N 88°07′13″W
- Country: United States
- State: Illinois
- County: White
- Elevation: 367 ft (112 m)
- Time zone: UTC-6 (Central (CST))
  - Summer (DST): UTC-5 (CDT)
- ZIP code: 62834
- Area code: 618
- GNIS feature ID: 408006

Emma is an unincorporated community in White County, Illinois, United States. It is located on the Little Wabash River, 4.5 miles (7.2 km) north of New Haven. It has a post office.
