= Carmi-White County High School =

Location
- 800 West Main Street; Carmi, Illinois 62821; United States
- 38°5′2.33″N 88°10′15.65″W

Information
- Funding type: Public
- Motto: Failure is not an option
- Founded: 1885
- School district: Carmi-White County Community Unit School District 5
- Superintendent: Jarrod Newell
- Principal: Bart King
- Teaching staff: 27.60 (FTE)
- Grades: 9-12
- Enrollment: 405 (2023-2024)
- Student to teacher ratio: 14.67
- Color: Maroon White
- Athletics conference: Black Diamond Conference
- Nickname: Bulldogs; Lady Bulldogs
- Rival: Fairfield Community High School
- Yearbook: The Carmian
- Website: www.carmischools.org/o/cwchs

Carmi-White County High School is a public high school in Carmi, Illinois, United States. It is a part of Carmi-White County Community Unit School District 5.

The school district (in which this is the sole comprehensive high school) includes Carmi, Crossville, Maunie, and Phillipstown.

== Athletics ==
Carmi-White County High School plays in the Black Diamond Conference (East Division).

=== State championships ===
- Boys Golf (Class A)
  - Team
    - 1975-76
    - 1976-77
    - 1977-78
    - 1978-79
    - 1979-80
  - Individual
    - 1976-77 John Given
    - 1978-79 John Given
    - 1979-80 Keith Bratton
    - 2001-02 Kyle Hosick

== Notable alumni ==
- Josh Elder - comic book creator (Mail Order Ninja, StarCraft: Frontline)
- Frederick J. Karch - U.S. Marine Corps Brigadier General (World War II, Vietnam)
- Glenn Poshard - Illinois State Senator (1984–1988), U.S. Representative (1989–1999), Illinois Gubernatorial Candidate (1998), President of Southern Illinois University (2006–Present)

== Clubs and extracurricular activities ==
- Band
- Thespian/Drama Club
- Student Council/Class Officef
- Math Team
- Science Club
- National Honor Society
- Fellowship of Christian Athletes
- Girls' Athletic Club
- Art Club

== Band ==
Carmi-White County High School Band participates in several activities and plays at all the Varsity Home games for Football and Basketball.

- Marching Band
- Pep Band
- Concert Band
- Jazz Band
