= Enfield Township, White County, Illinois =

Enfield Township
- Township

- Location of Illinois in the United States
- Coordinates: 38°04′32″N 88°18′58″W
- Country: United States
- State: Illinois
- County: White
- Organized: November 7, 1871

Area
  - Total: 35.45 sq mi (91.8 km^{2})
  - Land: 35.43 sq mi (91.8 km^{2})
  - Water: 0.01 sq mi (0.026 km^{2})
- Elevation: 433 ft (132 m)

Population (2010)
  - Estimate (2016): 885
- Time zone: UTC-6 (CST)
  - Summer (DST): UTC-5 (CDT)
- ZIP code: XXXXX
- Area code: 618
- FIPS code: 17-193-24192

Enfield Township is located in White County, Illinois. As of the 2010 census, its population was 905 and it contained 429 housing units.

== Geography ==
According to the 2010 census, the township has a total area of 35.45 square miles (91.8 km^{2}), of which 35.43 square miles (91.8 km^{2}) (or 99.94%) is land and 0.01 square miles (0.026 km^{2}) (or 0.03%) is water.

== Demographics ==
Historical population
Census	Pop.	Note	%±
2016 (est.)	885
U.S. Decennial Census
