= Gray Township, White County, Illinois =

Gray Township
- Township

- Location of Illinois in the United States
- Coordinates: 38°14′29″N 88°04′13″W
- Country: United States
- State: Illinois
- County: White
- Organized: November 7, 1871

Area
  - Total: 27.39 sq mi (70.9 km^{2})
  - Land: 26.94 sq mi (69.8 km^{2})
  - Water: 0.45 sq mi (1.2 km^{2})
- Elevation: 387 ft (118 m)

Population (2010)
  - Estimate (2016): 1,115
- Time zone: UTC-6 (CST)
  - Summer (DST): UTC-5 (CDT)
- ZIP code: XXXXX
- Area code: 618
- FIPS code: 17-193-31069

Gray Township is located in White County, Illinois. According to the 2010 census, it had a population of 1,141 and contained 556 housing units.

== History ==
Gray Township was named after James Gray, the founder of Grayville.

== Geography ==
According to the 2010 census, the township has a total area of 27.39 square miles (70.9 km^{2}), of which 26.94 square miles (69.8 km^{2}) (or 98.36%) is land and 0.45 square miles (1.2 km^{2}) (or 1.64%) is water.

== Demographics ==
Historical population
Census	Pop.	Note	%±
2016 (est.)	1,115
U.S. Decennial Census
