= Indian Creek Township, White County, Illinois =

Indian Creek Township
- Township

- Location of Illinois in the United States
- Coordinates: 37°58′26″N 88°19′11″W
- Country: United States
- State: Illinois
- County: White
- Organized: November 7, 1871

Area
  - Total: 54.16 sq mi (140.3 km^{2})
  - Land: 53.86 sq mi (139.5 km^{2})
  - Water: 0.31 sq mi (0.80 km^{2})
- Elevation: 420 ft (130 m)

Population (2010)
  - Estimate (2016): 2,263
- Time zone: UTC-6 (CST)
  - Summer (DST): UTC-5 (CDT)
- ZIP code: XXXXX
- Area code: 618
- FIPS code: 17-193-37231
- Website: indiancreektownship.com

Indian Creek Township is located in White County, Illinois. As of the 2010 census, its population was 2,322 and it contained 1,137 housing units.

== Geography ==
According to the 2010 census, the township has a total area of 54.16 square miles (140.3 km^{2}), of which 53.86 square miles (139.5 km^{2}) (or 99.45%) is land and 0.31 square miles (0.80 km^{2}) (or 0.57%) is water.

== Demographics ==
Historical population
Census	Pop.	Note	%±
2016 (est.)	2,263
U.S. Decennial Census
