= Carmi-White County Community Unit School District 5 =

School district in Illinois, United States

Carmi-White County Community Unit School District 5 is a school district headquartered in Carmi, Illinois.

The district is in White County. The district includes the townships of: Carmi, Hawthorne, Phillips, most of Burnt Prairie and Emma, and parts of Enfield, Heralds Prairie, and Mill Shoals. Places in the district include Carmi, Crossville, Maunie, and Phillipstown. The district has an area of about 240 square miles (620 km^{2}).

== History ==
In 2020 the enrollment was about 1,400. That year, the district was determining the internet statuses of families during the COVID-19 pandemic in Illinois, which disrupted in person education and required an internet-based education for a period. In 2023 the district began using the Affordable Internet Program to allow families of students to obtain internet service which had a cost lower than the standard cost.

In 2023 the district was searching for a superintendent. Robert Beskow of the Hometown Register stated that "many in the community [were] airing their frustrations" when the board of trustees did not select Amy Dixon, a principal and administrator, for the position; Beskow described her as "a popular choice". By November, of that year Dixon became the superintendent of Harrisburg Unit District 3.

== Schools ==
- Carmi-White County High School (Grades 9-12)
- Carmi White County Junior High School (7-8)
- Washington Attendance Center (4-6)
- Jefferson Attendance Center (2-3)
- Lincoln Attendance Center (Kindergarten and Grade 1)
- Prekindergarten Facility

As of the 2022-2023 school year, the district operates Brownsville Attendance Center (1-12) but there were zero students.
