= Mill Shoals Township, White County, Illinois =

Mill Shoals Township
- Township

- Location of Illinois in the United States
- Coordinates: 38°11′09″N 88°19′16″W
- Country: United States
- State: Illinois
- County: White
- Organized: November 7, 1871

Area
  - Total: 53.29 sq mi (138.0 km^{2})
  - Land: 53.26 sq mi (137.9 km^{2})
  - Water: 0.03 sq mi (0.078 km^{2})
- Elevation: 358 ft (109 m)

Population (2010)
  - Estimate (2016): 656
- Time zone: UTC-6 (CST)
  - Summer (DST): UTC-5 (CDT)
- ZIP code: XXXXX
- Area code: 618
- FIPS code: 17-193-49360

Mill Shoals Township is located in White County, Illinois. As of the 2010 census, its population was 668 and it contained 338 housing units.

== Geography ==
According to the 2010 census, the township has a total area of 53.29 square miles (138.0 km^{2}), of which 53.26 square miles (137.9 km^{2}) (or 99.94%) is land and 0.03 square miles (0.078 km^{2}) (or 0.06%) is water.

== Demographics ==
Historical population
Census	Pop.	Note	%±
2016 (est.)	656
U.S. Decennial Census
