= Carmi Township, White County, Illinois =

Carmi Township
- Township

- Location of Illinois in the United States
- Coordinates: 38°04′58″N 88°12′29″W
- Country: United States
- State: Illinois
- County: White
- Organized: November 7, 1871

Area
  - Total: 36.42 sq mi (94.3 km^{2})
  - Land: 35.95 sq mi (93.1 km^{2})
  - Water: 0.47 sq mi (1.2 km^{2})
- Elevation: 400 ft (120 m)

Population (2010)
  - Estimate (2016): 6,599
- Time zone: UTC-6 (CST)
  - Summer (DST): UTC-5 (CDT)
- ZIP code: XXXXX
- Area code: 618
- FIPS code: 17-193-11306
- Website: carmitownship.org

Carmi Township is located in White County, Illinois. As of the 2010 census, its population was 6,770 and it contained 3,271 housing units.

== Geography ==
According to the 2010 census, the township has a total area of 36.42 square miles (94.3 km^{2}), of which 35.95 square miles (93.1 km^{2}) (or 98.71%) is land and 0.47 square miles (1.2 km^{2}) (or 1.29%) is water.

== Demographics ==
Historical population
Census	Pop.	Note	%±
2016 (est.)	6,599
U.S. Decennial Census
