= Crossville, Illinois =

Crossville
- Village
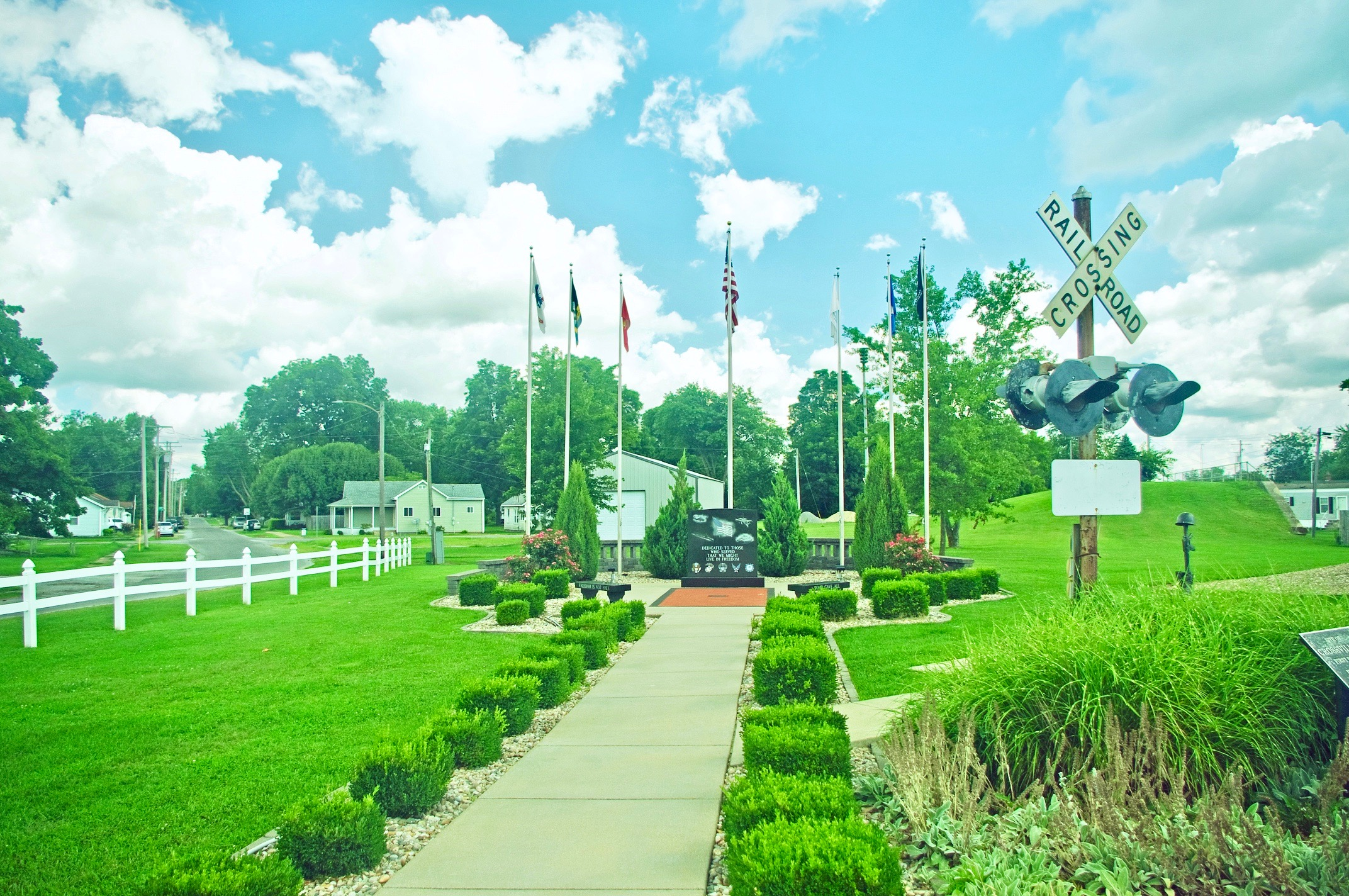
- Jacobs Park

- Location of Crossville in White County, Illinois.
- Coordinates: 38°09′45″N 88°03′52″W
- Country: United States
- State: Illinois
- County: White

Area
  - Total: 0.64 sq mi (1.66 km^{2})
  - Land: 0.64 sq mi (1.66 km^{2})
  - Water: 0 sq mi (0.00 km^{2})
- Elevation: 397 ft (121 m)

Population (2020)
  - Total: 623
  - Density: 972.7/sq mi (375.57/km^{2})
- Time zone: UTC-6 (CST)
  - Summer (DST): UTC-5 (CDT)
- ZIP code: 62827
- Area code: 618
- FIPS code: 17-17783
- GNIS ID: 2398655

Crossville is a village in White County, Illinois, United States. As of the 2020 census, Crossville had a population of 623.

== History ==
Crossville was laid out by surveyor John Mills in 1872 for Thomas Cross and Silas Elliott, and named for Thomas Cross. The original plat was one half mile square (160 acres or a quarter section), located in Section 23, Township 4 South, Range 10 East of the 3rd Principal Meridian.

The town's existence is closely tied to the opening of the Cairo and Vincennes Railroad on December 9, 1872. In 1853 the Vincennes and Paducah Railway Company was formed for the purpose of creating a railroad through the area, but that venture was unsuccessful. In 1857 the Illinois Southern Railway Company took up the idea, with a plan that originally contemplated routing the railroad through Phillipstown, but local land owners Stephen Fitzgerald and Solomon Charles refused to donate land to the Railway. Instead, in 1857 Thomas Cross donated right-of-way through the center of what would later become Crossville. The railroad project was stalled during the Civil War, but in 1867 the Cairo and Vincennes Railway Company was formed and work on the railroad proceeded in earnest.

The town was incorporated on September 30, 1895, and the town charter was filed on October 12, 1895, at 11:05 am.

=== 2017 tornado ===
On February 28, 2017, an EF3 wedge tornado touched down in Crossville, damaging the village as it passed through, resulting in one fatality.

== Geography ==
Crossville is concentrated around the intersection of Illinois State Route 1 and Illinois State Route 14, northeast of Carmi, and several miles west of the Illinois-Indiana state line along the Wabash River.

According to the 2010 census, Crossville has a total area of 0.64 square miles (1.66 km^{2}), all land.

== Demographics ==
Historical population
Census	Pop.	Note	%±
1880	162		—
1900	523		—
1910	574		9.8%
1920	558		−2.8%
1930	508		−9.0%
1940	666		31.1%
1950	866		30.0%
1960	874		0.9%
1970	860		−1.6%
1980	944		9.8%
1990	805		−14.7%
2000	782		−2.9%
2010	745		−4.7%
2020	623		−16.4%
U.S. Decennial Census

As of the census of 2000, there were 782 people, 341 households, and 220 families residing in the village. The population density was 1,217.1 inhabitants per square mile (469.9/km^{2}). There were 388 housing units at an average density of 603.9 per square mile (233.2/km^{2}). The racial makeup of the village was 97.70% White, 1.15% Native American, and 1.15% from two or more races. Hispanic or Latino of any race were 1.02% of the population.

There were 341 households, out of which 29.9% had children under the age of 18 living with them, 51.9% were married couples living together, 9.4% had a female householder with no husband present, and 35.2% were non-families. 31.1% of all households were made up of individuals, and 18.2% had someone living alone who was 65 years of age or older. The average household size was 2.29 and the average family size was 2.89.

In the village, the population was spread out, with 24.3% under the age of 18, 6.8% from 18 to 24, 27.7% from 25 to 44, 21.7% from 45 to 64, and 19.4% who were 65 years of age or older. The median age was 40 years. For every 100 females, there were 97.5 males. For every 100 females age 18 and over, there were 90.4 males.

The median income for a household in the village was $31,202, and the median income for a family was $35,972. Males had a median income of $33,000 versus $17,250 for females. The per capita income for the village was $14,835. About 10.9% of families and 16.4% of the population were below the poverty line, including 26.2% of those under age 18 and 8.3% of those age 65 or over.

== Education ==
It is in the Carmi-White County Community Unit School District 5. The district's comprehensive high school is Carmi-White County High School.
