= WROY =

- Carmi, Illinois; United States
- Frequency: 1460 kHz
- Branding: All Oldies 1460

Programming
- Format: Oldies
- Affiliations: Fox News Radio

Ownership
- Owner: Mark Lange and Saundra Lange; (The Original Company, Inc.)
- Sister stations: WRUL

History
- First air date: December 13, 1948

Technical information
- Licensing authority: FCC
- Facility ID: 9011
- Class: D
- Power: 1,000 watts day 85 watts night
- Transmitter coordinates: 38°04′57.2″N 88°12′6.1″W
- Translator: 93.3 W227ED (Carmi)

Links
- Public license information: Public file; LMS
- Website: WROY Online

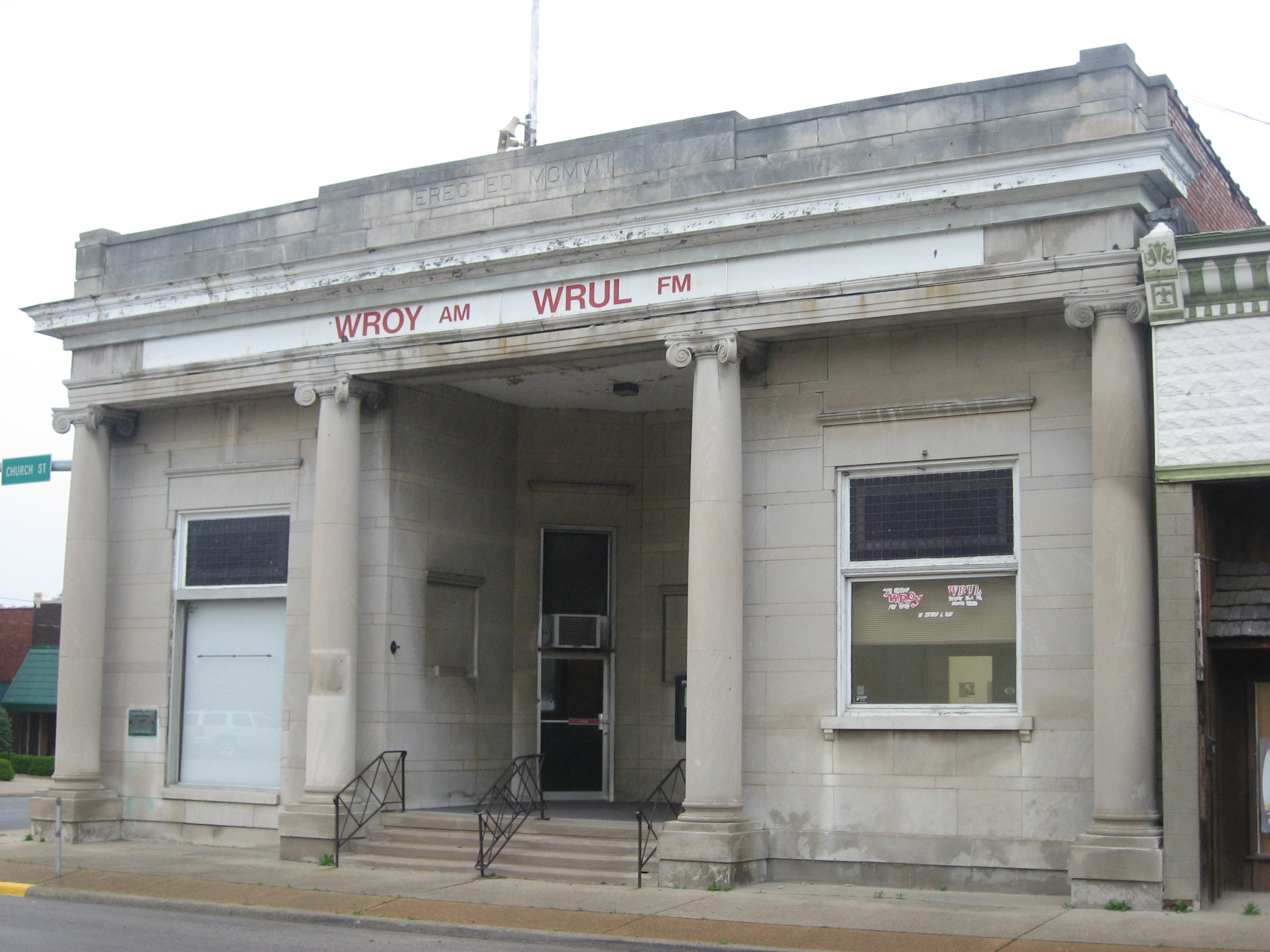
WROY offices in Carmi

WROY (1460 AM, "All Oldies 1460") is an American radio station licensed to serve the community of Carmi, Illinois. WROY broadcasts an oldies format and is owned by Mark and Saundra Lange, through licensee The Original Company, Inc.

== History ==
WROY was first licensed December 13, 1948. The station ran 1,000 watts during daytime hours only. By 1990, nighttime operations had been added, running 85 watts. By 1991, the station had begun airing an oldies format.
