= Bieker-Wilson Village Site =

Archaeological site in Illinois, United States

- U.S. National Register of Historic Places
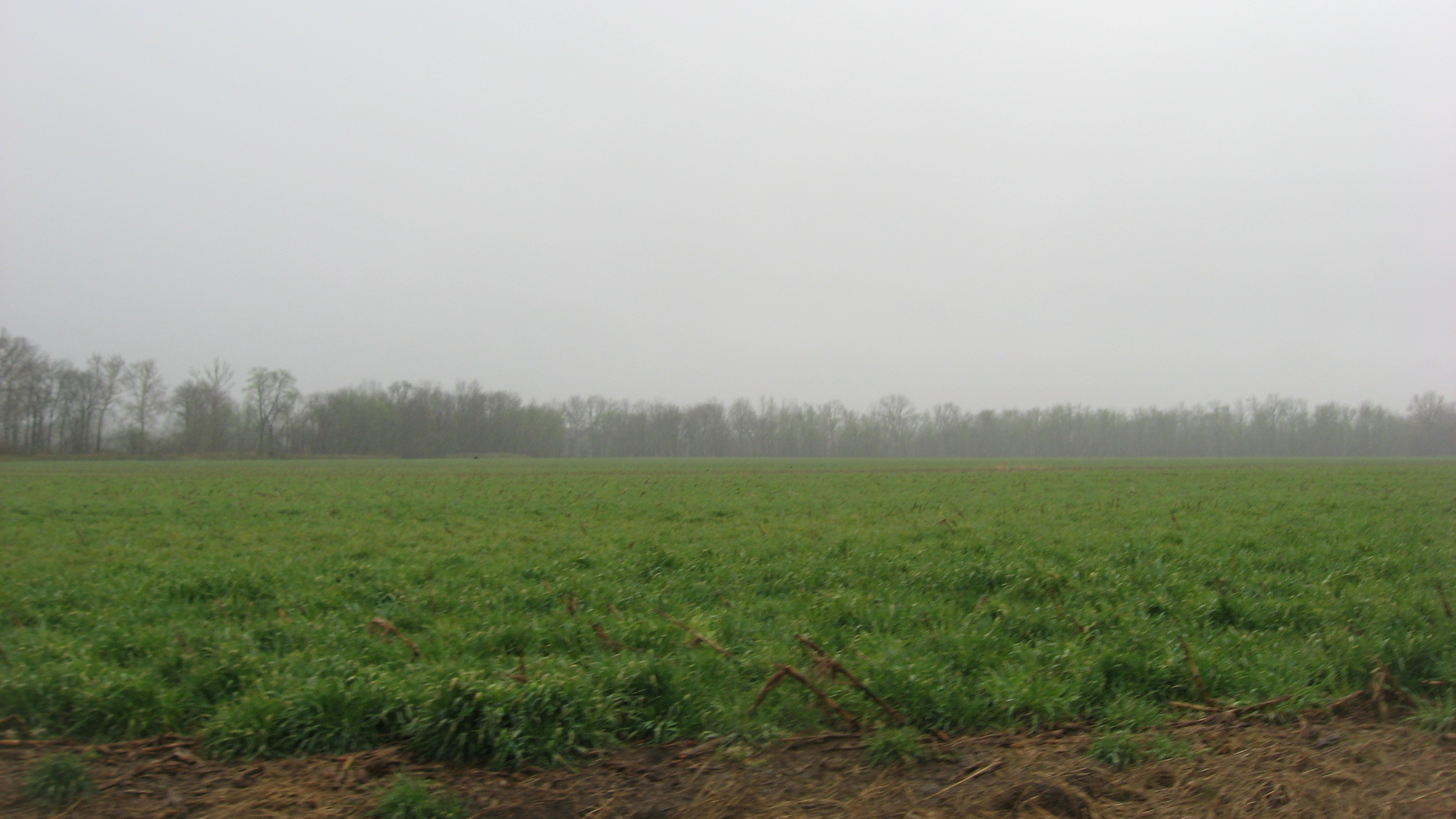
- Fields at the site on a rainy day

- Location within Illinois Location within the United States
- Location: Sandy Slough, southeast of the junction of County Road 300N and 1650E
- Nearest city: New Haven, Illinois
- Coordinates: 37°55′2″N 88°4′34″W
- Area: 40 acres (16 ha)
- NRHP reference No.: 78001197
- Added to NRHP: November 21, 1978

The Bieker-Wilson Village Site is an archaeological site in the far southeastern section of the U.S. state of Illinois. Inhabited during multiple periods over more than five hundred years, the village has been designated a historic site.

== Geographic context ==
Bieker-Wilson occupies river bottomland near the mouth of the Wabash River. It was previously located on the riverside, but the river has shifted and now flows farther to the east; the old river is now a slow-moving bayou locally known as Sandy Slough. Today, the site is farmland; it lies about 2.5 miles (4.0 km) northeast of the small community of New Haven. One of numerous archaeological sites on the Illinois side of the lower Wabash valley, it lies in a region inhabited for thousands of years before Columbus.

== Archaeological work ==
In the 1960s, regional interests proposed the construction of the Cross Wabash Valley Waterway, which would have required extensive construction projects along the river in order to make it more accessible to riverine shipping. Before the project was cancelled, the Corps arranged with the University of Illinois to conduct a field survey of the river valley. Under the direction of Robert Clouse, surveyors discovered the Bieker-Wilson Site in 1972, and further study was performed one year later by Southern Illinois University scholar Ronald Pulcher. While neither survey conducted any excavations, simple observation of the site and collection of artifacts from the surface has shown it to have been a significant settlement at one time: a portion of the site slightly less than 4 acres (1.6 ha) in area has soil much darker in color than the rest of the field, which the surveyors interpreted as evidence of a substantial midden in the darkened area.

== Research conclusions ==
Although the site has not been excavated, the surface collections performed by the original surveyors have enabled scholars to form some conclusions about Bieker-Wilson's inhabitants. It is known that the site was occupied during the Middle and Late Woodland Period as well as by peoples of the later Mississippian culture; the site was inhabited for at least five hundred years, and occupation for more than a millennium is possible. Multiple major Woodland sites have been found in the immediate vicinity; two such sites, Hubele and Wilson, are located about 5 miles (8.0 km) to the northeast. During the succeeding Late Woodland period, people of a culture known as the Duffy Complex lived on the Illinois side of the Wabash near its mouth; Bieker-Wilson, like Hubele, is one of the few sites that has been identified as a potential Duffy village site. Because the Duffy Complex is known from so few sites, comparatively little is known about its people; their distinctively plain pottery is well attested, but their chronological place in relation to other Woodland cultures is uncertain, as is their relationship (if any) with other peoples living at the same time period. Even the cursory surveys performed at Bieker-Wilson were able to demonstrate that Duffy peoples lived there, and as such it is deemed important because of the possibility that excavation of its large midden could clarify much that remains unknown about the culture. The site's uses were apparently minimal during the Middle Woodland; it was seemingly employed for toolworking purposes or used as a campsite, but even such a slight occupation has the chance of expanding current knowledge about Middle Woodland campsites. Finally, because the site was used during multiple phases of prehistory, the surveyors suggested that it would hold clues to cultural transitions: how did the Late Woodland peoples of the area come to participate in what today is known as the Mississippian culture? The chance that Bieker-Wilson might be able to answer this and similar questions was central to its importance for regional archaeology.

== Preservation ==
Immediately after the site's discovery, when no formal protection had been applied to it, Bieker-Wilson was being well maintained; the owner was employing it as part of his farm, and no substantial evidence of damage could be found. In order to give the site additional protection, the Illinois Archaeological Survey produced an application in June 1977 for the site to be listed on the National Register of Historic Places, and the National Park Service granted this designation in November 1978. While National Register designation does not infringe on private landowners' rights to use their properties as they wish, it prohibits federal agencies and federally funded projects undertaken by other agencies from damaging the property without first engaging in a lengthy review process. Bieker-Wilson is one of eleven National Register-listed locations in White County; the Hubele and Wilson village sites are among the other ten, and most of the remainder are located in the city of Carmi.

== See also ==
- List of archaeological sites on the National Register of Historic Places in Illinois
