= WRUL =

Radio station in Carmi, Illinois

- Carmi, Illinois; United States
- Broadcast area: Evansville, Indiana
- Frequency: 97.3 MHz

Programming
- Format: Country
- Affiliations: Fox News Radio; Compass Media Networks

Ownership
- Owner: Mark Lange and Saundra Lange; (The Original Company, Inc.)
- Sister stations: WROY

History
- First air date: July 2, 1951 (first license granted)

Technical information
- Licensing authority: FCC
- Facility ID: 9010
- Class: B
- ERP: 50,000 watts
- HAAT: 149.0 meters (488.8 ft)
- Transmitter coordinates: 38°4′54.00″N 88°12′4.00″W

Links
- Public license information: Public file; LMS
- Webcast: Listen Live
- Website: wrul.com

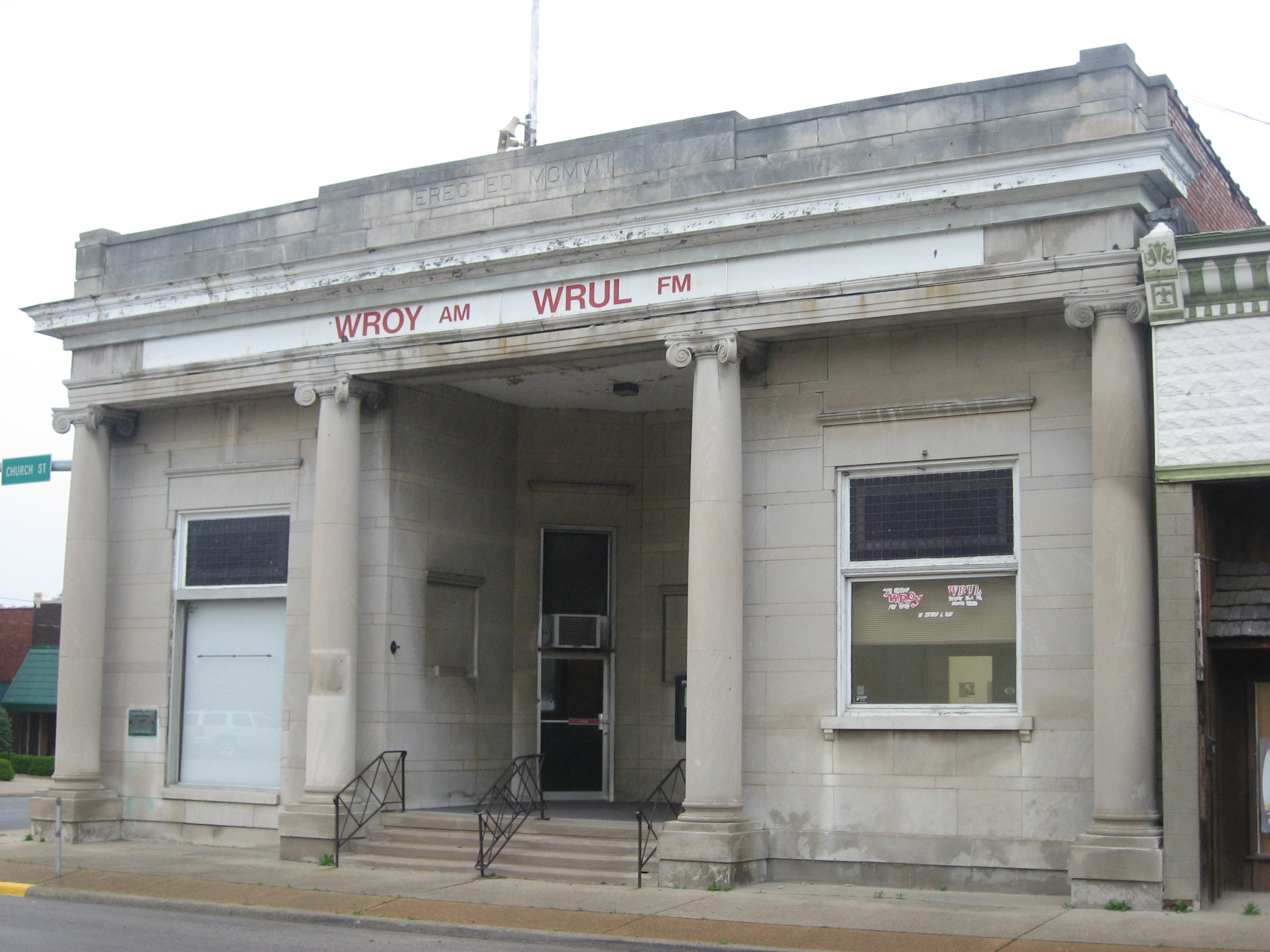
WRUL offices in Carmi

WRUL (97.3 FM) is a radio station broadcasting a country music format. Licensed to Carmi, Illinois, United States, the station serves the Evansville, Indiana area. The station is currently owned by Mark and Saundra Lange, through licensee The Original Company, Inc., and features programming from Fox News Radio and Compass Media Networks.

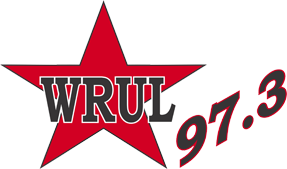
Previous logo

== See also ==
Fred G. Hoffherr
