= Davenport Griffen =

American painter

William Davenport Griffen (1894 Millbrook, New York – 1986 San Rafael, California) was an American artist and muralist.

== Education ==
He graduated from Iowa State University and studied at the Chicago Academy of Fine Arts and at the Art Institute of Chicago. In 1928, he won the $750 John Quincy Adams scholarship to the Art Institute.

== Career ==
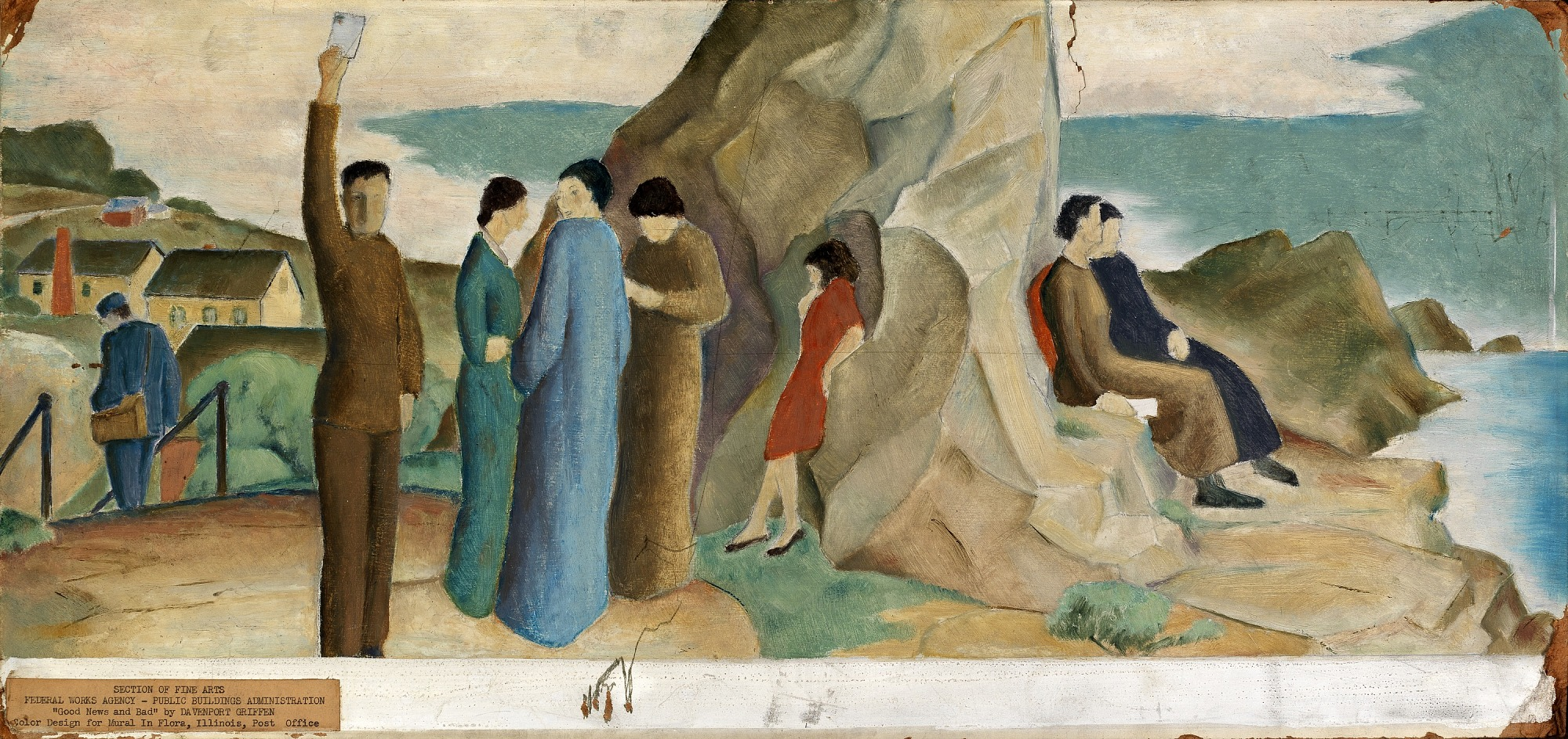
Good News and Bad (1936), study for Griffen's post office mural in Flora, Illinois

He worked for the Illinois Works Progress Administration. For the Treasury Department's Section of Painting and Sculpture, he painted a mural at the Flora, Illinois post office, Good News and Bad, in 1937. He painted a second post office mural in Carmi, Illinois titled Service to the Farmer, in 1939. His works are displayed at the Pennsylvania Academy of the Fine Arts, Smithsonian American Art Museum, and the Whitney Museum of American Art. His work was exhibited at the Carnegie Institute, Corcoran gallery of art, Pennsylvania academy of the Fine arts and the Art Institute of Chicago and more
