= Fred G. Hoffherr =

French-American professor, author, and activist

Frédéric Georges Hoffherr (c. 1888 – October 11, 1956) was a French-American professor, author and anti-Vichy activist.

Hoffherr was a professor emeritus and led the French department at Barnard College. He joined the Columbia faculty in 1919, promoted to an "assistant professorship of French" in 1926, the following year, he was awarded the Guggenheim Fellowship. He was chairman of the French department from 1927 to 1936. Hoffherr retired in 1953, but had been a special lecturer until 1955.

== WWII ==
During WWII Hoffherr worked for de Gaulle, serving as head of press and information services for him and broadcast for the Voice of America. He was of the founders of France Forever, becoming its publicity director and later its executive vice-president.

He made use of the WRUL radio station since the beginning of 1941. Of his radio addresses in 1942, were published in a book.

== Books ==
Hoffherr had directed the editorship of L'évolution de la littérature française; petit traité à l'usage des étudiants américains, wrote a foreword for A Mystery Story of Napoleon's Court, had authored: the Basic College French; French Language Chrestomaties and reader; and the Book of Friendship: Le Livre de L'amitié.
