= Epworth, Illinois =

- Unincorporated community
- Location within Illinois Location within the United States
- Coordinates: 38°04′14″N 88°06′22″W
- Country: United States
- State: Illinois
- County: White
- Elevation: 390 ft (120 m)
- Time zone: UTC-6 (Central (CST))
  - Summer (DST): UTC-5 (CDT)
- Area code: 618
- GNIS feature ID: 408050

Epworth (also Hawthorn Station) is an unincorporated community in White County, Illinois, United States.
