= Phillipstown, Illinois =

Phillipstown
- Village
- Location of Phillipstown in White County, Illinois.
- Coordinates: 38°08′34″N 88°01′05″W
- Country: United States
- State: Illinois
- County: White

Area
  - Total: 0.27 sq mi (0.70 km^{2})
  - Land: 0.27 sq mi (0.70 km^{2})
  - Water: 0 sq mi (0.00 km^{2})
- Elevation: 489 ft (149 m)

Population (2020)
  - Total: 34
  - Density: 125.7/sq mi (48.54/km^{2})
- Time zone: UTC-6 (CST)
  - Summer (DST): UTC-5 (CDT)
- ZIP code: 62827
- Area code: 618
- FIPS code: 17-59520
- GNIS ID: 2399664

Phillipstown is a village in White County, Illinois, United States. As of the 2020 census, Phillipstown had a population of 34.

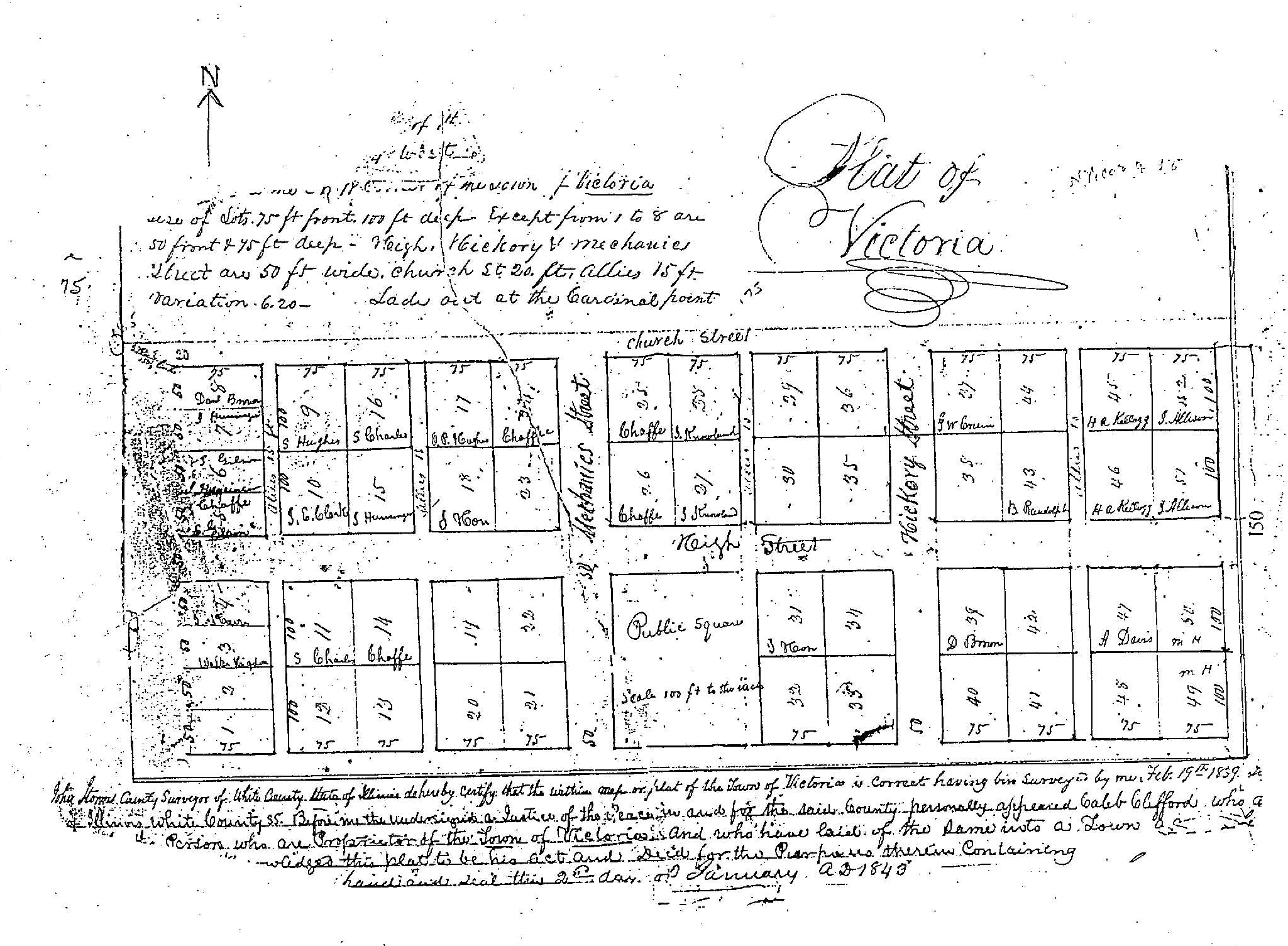
Plat of Victoria, now Phillipstown

== History ==
Phillipstown was surveyed for Caleb Clifford on February 19, 1839, and the plat was recorded on January 2, 1843. It was originally named Victoria, but at that time the name was already in use by another post office in Illinois, so a new name had to be chosen. By order of the State Legislature, on January 29, 1840, it was renamed in honor of Major Alexander Phillips, an early settler of the area who had made a land entry for an adjoining property in 1817 while the area was still part of Illinois Territory.

The land upon which Phillipstown was platted had originally been entered by James Phillips, who quite likely was Alexander Phillips' father. James' interest in the land was sold to David Phillips and John McClure Graham (husband of Rebecca Phillips), who received a patent to the land on November 15, 1830 (David and Rebecca were likely siblings of Alexander). They sold the property to Major Alexander Phillips on January 6, 1837. On February 17, 1837, he sold the property to Caleb Clifford.

In addition to his service during the War of 1812, Major Alexander Phillips was also elected to serve in the House of Representatives for White County, Illinois in the 1st, 2nd, 3rd, 4th, 11th and 12th Illinois General Assemblies.

== Geography ==
According to the 2010 census, Phillipstown has a total area of 0.27 square miles (0.70 km^{2}), all land.

== Demographics ==
Historical population
Census	Pop.	Note	%±
1900	100		—
1910	105		5.0%
1920	70		−33.3%
1930	47		−32.9%
1940	53		12.8%
1950	102		92.5%
1960	69		−32.4%
1970	55		−20.3%
1980	37		−32.7%
1990	48		29.7%
2000	28		−41.7%
2010	44		57.1%
2020	34		−22.7%
U.S. Decennial Census

As of the census of 2000, there were 28 people, 13 households, and 7 families residing in the village. The population density was 103.3 inhabitants per square mile (39.9/km^{2}). There were 15 housing units at an average density of 55.3 per square mile (21.4/km^{2}). The racial makeup of the village was 100.00% White.

There were 13 households, out of which 15.4% had children under the age of 18 living with them, 61.5% were married couples living together, and 38.5% were non-families. 30.8% of all households were made up of individuals, and 15.4% had someone living alone who was 65 years of age or older. The average household size was 2.15 and the average family size was 2.75.

In the village, the population was spread out, with 14.3% under the age of 18, 7.1% from 18 to 24, 35.7% from 25 to 44, 17.9% from 45 to 64, and 25.0% who were 65 years of age or older. The median age was 42 years. For every 100 females, there were 86.7 males. For every 100 females age 18 and over, there were 100.0 males.

The median income for a household in the village was $42,917, and the median income for a family was $44,167. Males had a median income of $43,125 versus $43,750 for females. The per capita income for the village was $21,188. There were no families and 4.0% of the population living below the poverty line, including no under eighteens and none of those over 64.

== Education ==
It is in the Carmi-White County Community Unit School District 5. The district's comprehensive high school is Carmi-White County High School.
