= Burnt Prairie Township, White County, Illinois =

Burnt Prairie Township
- Township

- Location of Illinois in the United States
- Coordinates: 38°11′46″N 88°12′18″W
- Country: United States
- State: Illinois
- County: White
- Organized: November 7, 1871

Area
  - Total: 54.04 sq mi (140.0 km^{2})
  - Land: 54.03 sq mi (139.9 km^{2})
  - Water: 0.01 sq mi (0.026 km^{2})
- Elevation: 407 ft (124 m)

Population (2010)
  - Estimate (2016): 339
- Time zone: UTC-6 (CST)
  - Summer (DST): UTC-5 (CDT)
- ZIP code: XXXXX
- Area code: 618
- FIPS code: 17-193-09902

Burnt Prairie Township is located in White County, Illinois. As of the 2010 census, its population was 345 and it contained 195 housing units.

== Geography ==
According to the 2010 census, the township has a total area of 54.04 square miles (140.0 km^{2}), of which 54.03 square miles (139.9 km^{2}) (or 99.98%) is land and 0.01 square miles (0.026 km^{2}) (or 0.02%) is water.

== Demographics ==
Historical population
Census	Pop.	Note	%±
2016 (est.)	339
U.S. Decennial Census
