= L. Haas Store =

- U.S. National Register of Historic Places
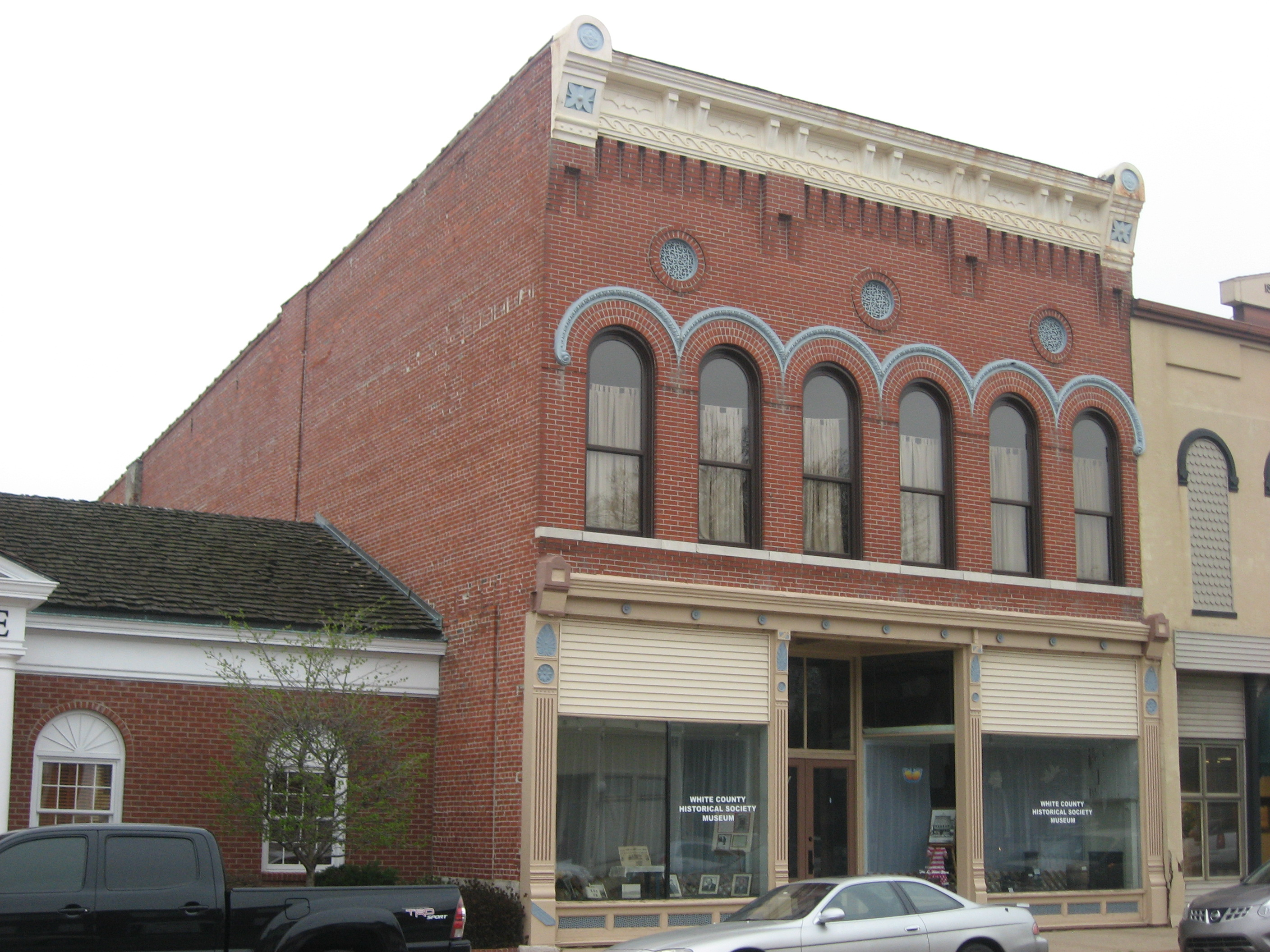

- Location within Illinois Location within the United States
- Location: 219 E. Main St., Carmi, Illinois
- Coordinates: 38°5′26″N 88°9′36″W
- Area: less than one acre
- Built: 1896
- Architectural style: Italian Renaissance Revival
- NRHP reference No.: 94000026
- Added to NRHP: February 4, 1994

The L. Haas Store is a historic commercial building located at 219 E. Main St. in Carmi, Illinois. The store was built in 1896 for merchant Louis Haas, a Jewish immigrant from Germany. Though the store was named for and run by Haas, he did not actually own the building, which was the property of local businessman John Storms. The store was designed in the Italian Renaissance Revival style. The first floor of the store has a cast iron storefront manufactured by the J. B. Mesker Company; the company also made the building's ornate iron cornice and the iron grilles above the second floor. The second floor features six tall, arched windows, which are topped by a thin strip of curved limestone. The store now houses a history museum run by the White County Historical Society.

The building was added to the National Register of Historic Places on February 4, 1994.
