= Springerton, Illinois =

Springerton
- Village
- Location of Springerton in White County, Illinois.
- Coordinates: 38°10′43″N 88°21′19″W
- Country: United States
- State: Illinois
- County: White

Area
  - Total: 0.14 sq mi (0.36 km^{2})
  - Land: 0.14 sq mi (0.36 km^{2})
  - Water: 0 sq mi (0.00 km^{2})
- Elevation: 417 ft (127 m)

Population (2020)
  - Total: 101
  - Density: 735.2/sq mi (283.88/km^{2})
- Time zone: UTC-6 (CST)
  - Summer (DST): UTC-5 (CDT)
- ZIP code: 62887
- Area code: 618
- FIPS code: 17-71643
- GNIS ID: 2399879

Springerton is a village in White County, Illinois, United States. As of the 2020 census, Springerton had a population of 101.

== Geography ==
According to the 2010 census, Springerton has a total area of 0.12 square miles (0.31 km^{2}), all land.

== Demographics ==
Historical population
| Census | Pop. | Note | %± |
|---|---|---|---|
| 1880 | 133 | | — |
| 1900 | 378 | | — |
| 1910 | 418 | | 10.6% |
| 1920 | 318 | | −23.9% |
| 1930 | 365 | | 14.8% |
| 1940 | 301 | | −17.5% |
| 1950 | 279 | | −7.3% |
| 1960 | 232 | | −16.8% |
| 1970 | 228 | | −1.7% |
| 1980 | 154 | | −32.5% |
| 1990 | 166 | | 7.8% |
| 2000 | 134 | | −19.3% |
| 2010 | 110 | | −17.9% |
| 2020 | 101 | | −8.2% |
U.S. Decennial Census

As of the census of 2000, there were 134 people, 56 households, and 36 families residing in the village. The population density was 1,068.7 inhabitants per square mile (412.6/km^{2}). There were 71 housing units at an average density of 566.3 per square mile (218.6/km^{2}). The racial makeup of the village was 97.76% White, 0.75% Native American, and 1.49% from two or more races.

There were 56 households, out of which 30.4% had children under the age of 18 living with them, 58.9% were married couples living together, 5.4% had a female householder with no husband present, and 35.7% were non-families. 33.9% of all households were made up of individuals, and 25.0% had someone living alone who was 65 years of age or older. The average household size was 2.39 and the average family size was 3.14.

In the village, the population was spread out, with 25.4% under the age of 18, 7.5% from 18 to 24, 26.9% from 25 to 44, 19.4% from 45 to 64, and 20.9% who were 65 years of age or older. The median age was 41 years. For every 100 females, there were 88.7 males. For every 100 females age 18 and over, there were 96.1 males.

The median income for a household in the village was $26,000, and the median income for a family was $30,000. Males had a median income of $30,625 versus $16,250 for females. The per capita income for the village was $12,568. There were 10.0% of families and 10.6% of the population living below the poverty line, including 18.9% of under eighteens and 7.1% of those over 64.
