= Phillips Township, White County, Illinois =

Phillips Township
- Township

- Location of Illinois in the United States
- Coordinates: 38°10′09″N 88°02′58″W
- Country: United States
- State: Illinois
- County: White
- Organized: November 7, 1871

Area
  - Total: 66.38 sq mi (171.9 km^{2})
  - Land: 65.05 sq mi (168.5 km^{2})
  - Water: 1.33 sq mi (3.4 km^{2})
- Elevation: 476 ft (145 m)

Population (2010)
  - Estimate (2016): 1,214
- Time zone: UTC-6 (CST)
  - Summer (DST): UTC-5 (CDT)
- ZIP code: XXXXX
- Area code: 618
- FIPS code: 17-193-59507

Phillips Township is located in White County, Illinois. As of the 2010 census, its population was 1,258 and it contained 610 housing units.

== History ==
Phillips Township was likely named for Major Alexander Phillips, who made a land entry in 1817 for a quarter section of land abutting to the west of where Phillipstown, Illinois would be platted two decades later.

== Geography ==
According to the 2010 census, the township has a total area of 66.38 square miles (171.9 km^{2}), of which 65.05 square miles (168.5 km^{2}) (or 98.00%) is land and 1.33 square miles (3.4 km^{2}) (or 2.00%) is water.

== Demographics ==
Historical population
Census	Pop.	Note	%±
2016 (est.)	1,214
U.S. Decennial Census
