= Rising Sun, White County, Illinois =

Rising Sun, Illinois
- Unincorporated community
- Location within Illinois Location within the United States
- Coordinates: 38°00′01″N 88°01′41″W
- Country: United States
- State: Illinois
- County: White
- Elevation: 371 ft (113 m)
- Time zone: UTC-6 (Central (CST))
  - Summer (DST): UTC-5 (CDT)
- Area code: 618
- GNIS feature ID: 416692

Rising Sun is an unincorporated community in White County, Illinois, United States. Rising Sun is located on the Wabash River southeast of Maunie.
