= Heralds Prairie Township, White County, Illinois =

Heralds Prairie Township
- Township

- Location of Illinois in the United States
- Coordinates: 37°58′31″N 88°12′06″W
- Country: United States
- State: Illinois
- County: White
- Organized: November 7, 1871

Area
  - Total: 54.75 sq mi (141.8 km^{2})
  - Land: 54.11 sq mi (140.1 km^{2})
  - Water: 0.64 sq mi (1.7 km^{2})
- Elevation: 443 ft (135 m)

Population (2010)
  - Estimate (2016): 573
- Time zone: UTC-6 (CST)
  - Summer (DST): UTC-5 (CDT)
- ZIP code: XXXXX
- Area code: 618
- FIPS code: 17-193-34228
- Website: www.heraldsprairietownship.com

Heralds Prairie Township is located in White County, Illinois. As of the 2010 census, its population was 594 and it contained 269 housing units.

== Geography ==
According to the 2010 census, the township has a total area of 54.75 square miles (141.8 km^{2}), of which 54.11 square miles (140.1 km^{2}) (or 98.83%) is land and 0.64 square miles (1.7 km^{2}) (or 1.17%) is water.

== Demographics ==
Historical population
Census	Pop.	Note	%±
2016 (est.)	573
U.S. Decennial Census
