= Wilson Mounds and Village Site =

Archaeological site in Illinois, United States

- U.S. National Register of Historic Places
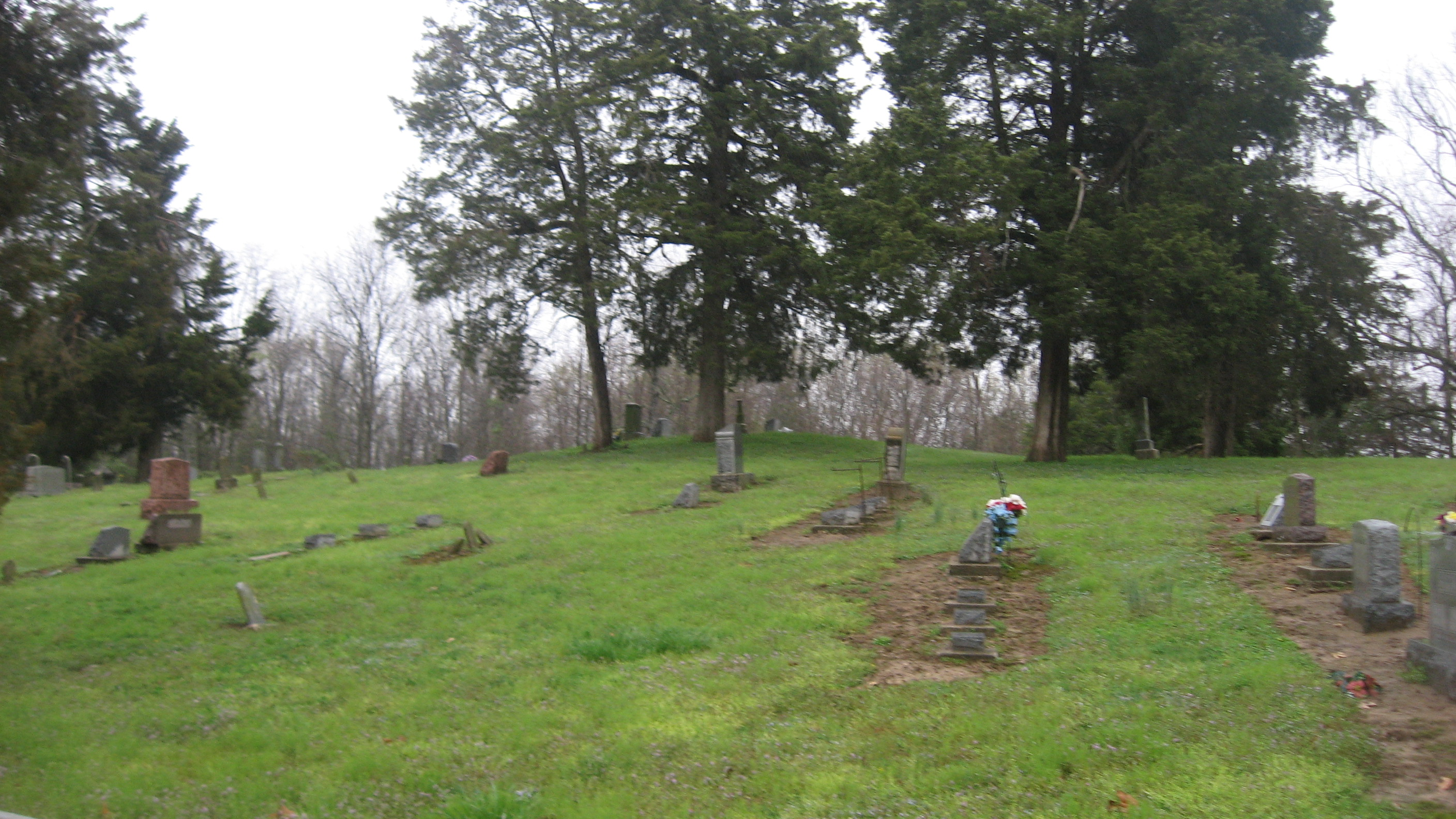

- Location within Illinois Location within the United States
- Location: Within and surrounding the Marshall Ferry Cemetery at Rising Sun
- Coordinates: 37°59′57″N 88°1′55″W
- Area: 430 acres (170 ha)
- NRHP reference No.: 77000491
- Added to NRHP: November 16, 1977

The Wilson Mounds and Village Site is a prehistoric archaeological site located in and around the Marshall Ferry Cemetery in Rising Sun, White County, Illinois. The site includes twelve Hopewell burial mounds and a village site.

== History ==
The site was inhabited by Hopewell peoples from approximately 400 B.C. to 400 A.D.

Excavations at the site began in the 1940s; the first formal investigations were conducted the following decade by the Illinois State Museum and the University of Chicago. The site was part of a trade network which spanned much of the eastern United States, as resources from as far away as North Carolina and the Lake Superior region have been found at the site. Two different skeletal types have been recovered from the site, indicating the presence of multiple cultures at the village. The site also includes a prehistoric cemetery in addition to burial mounds, suggesting that burials were organized based on social status.

The site was added to the National Register of Historic Places on November 16, 1977.

== See also ==
- List of archaeological sites on the National Register of Historic Places in Illinois
