= White County, Illinois =

County in Illinois, United States

- County
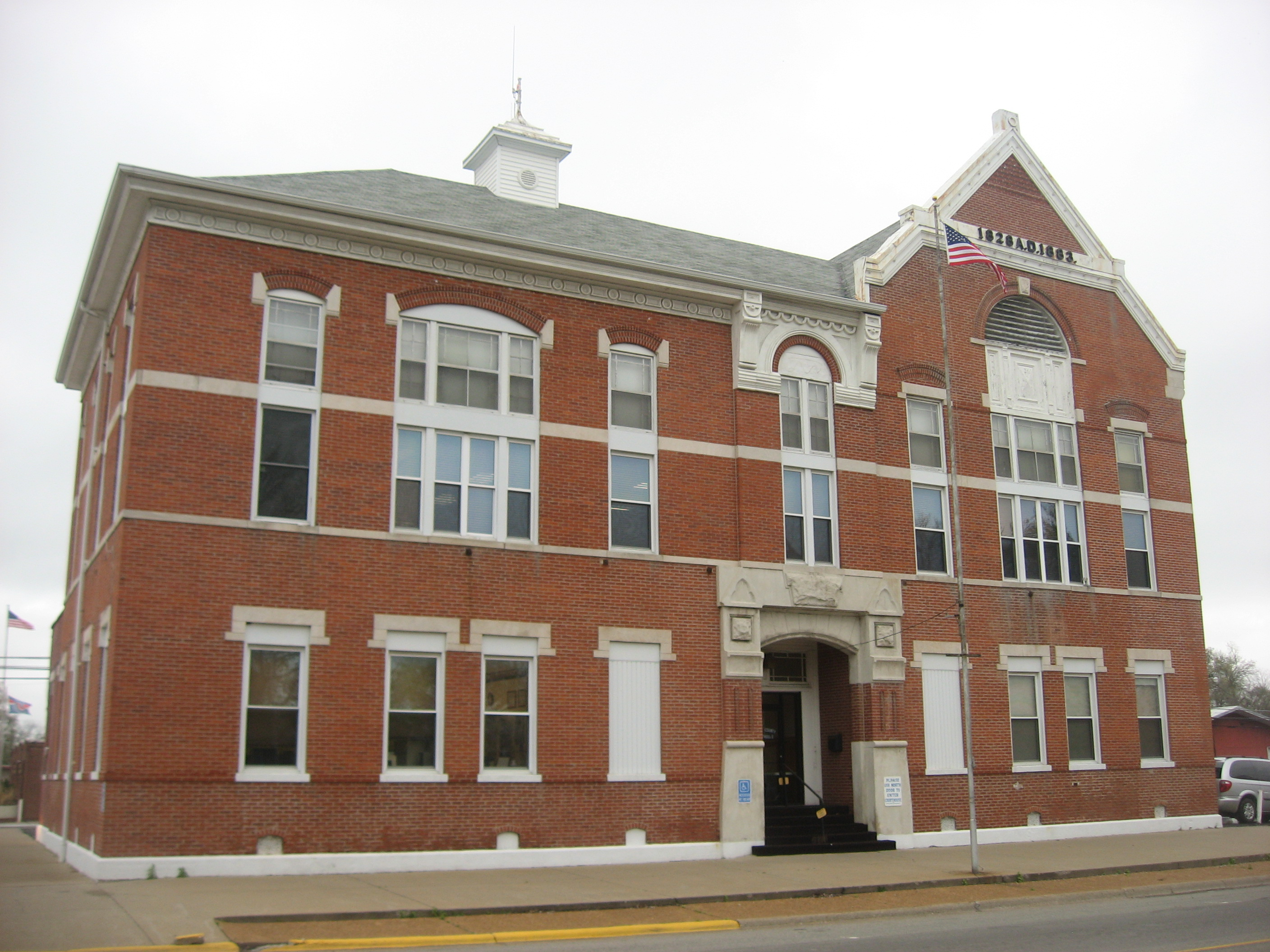
- White County Courthouse in Carmi

- Location within the U.S. state of Illinois
- Coordinates: 38°05′N 88°11′W
- Country: United States
- State: Illinois
- Founded: 1815
- Named for: Isaac White
- Seat: Carmi
- Largest city: Carmi

Area
  - Total: 502 sq mi (1,300 km^{2})
  - Land: 495 sq mi (1,280 km^{2})
  - Water: 7.1 sq mi (18 km^{2}) 1.4%

Population (2020)
  - Total: 13,877
  - Estimate (2025): 13,250 ▼
  - Density: 28.0/sq mi (10.8/km^{2})
- Time zone: UTC−6 (Central)
  - Summer (DST): UTC−5 (CDT)
- Congressional district: 12th
- Website: www.whitecounty-il.gov

White County is a county located in the U.S. state of Illinois. According to the 2020 census, it had a population of 13,877. Its county seat is Carmi. It is located in the southern portion of Illinois known locally as "Little Egypt".

== History ==
White County was organized from Gallatin County in 1815, and was named after Captain Leonard White, a Gallatin County legislator who is credited with the idea of extending the Illinois-Wisconsin border a few miles north of the southern tip of Lake Michigan. He was killed in 1811 at the Battle of Tippecanoe. The county seat, Carmi, was founded in 1814, and incorporated in 1816. The first courthouse was in the log cabin of John Craw.

The first white settlers came to White County between 1807 and 1809. The first settlements were near the Little Wabash River and Big Prairie, one of the numerous prairies in the county. These families—Hanna, Land, Hay, Williams, Calvert, Ratcliff, Holderby, Robinson, Stewart, among others—typically had spent time in the Carolinas, Kentucky or Tennessee before moving into Illinois, and most were of Scots-Irish descent. Many came through the land office at Shawneetown, Illinois, which was a port for flatboats which traveled the Ohio River.

Other early settlements were Grayville, located at the mouth of Bonpas Creek and the Wabash River, settled by the Gray family around 1810; Phillipstown, on the bluffs above the Wabash and Fox River floodplain; and New Haven (mostly in Gallatin County), which was home to a brother of Daniel Boone around 1818. Old Sharon Church (Presbyterian), located near the later village of Sacramento, was organized around 1816, and the village of Seven Mile Prairie was established a few miles north of the church in the 1830s. The parents of longtime Abraham Lincoln girlfriend Ann Rutledge were part of this group, along with families named McArthy, Miller, McClellan, Pollard, Storey, Fields, and Johnson.

About 1839, a group of Irish immigrants began moving into the extreme western part of Enfield Township, led by Patrick Dolan, as well as members of the Mitchell and Dunn clans. Dolan was auctioneer in 1853 when the village of Enfield was platted, as Seven Mile moved west in anticipation of a railroad line, which was not built until 1872. German families moved into the middle portion of the county in the 1840s and onward, especially from the Baden region, and included the family names of Rebstock, Dartt, Brown, Sailer, Stanley, and Drone.

The second half of the 19th century saw the establishment of the towns of Norris City, Springerton, Mill Shoals (once the home of a thriving barrel-making industry which depleted the nearby virgin forests), Epworth, Herald, Burnt Prairie (previously known as "Liberty"), Crossville, Phillipstown, Concord (also known as Emma), Maunie and Rising Sun (commonly called Dogtown)--the latter two villages are located on the Wabash and attracted several African-American families. A number of villages which no longer exist were also formed: Trumbull, Roland, Middle Point, Stokes Station, Gossett, Bungay, Calvin, Iron, and Dolan Settlement.

In 1925, White County was the last of five Illinois counties affected by the infamous Tri-State Tornado. Although the storm spared the towns of Carmi, Enfield and Crossville, significant damage was done to the surrounding rural areas, where 28 people were killed, dozens were injured and scores of homes and farms were destroyed.

Agriculture was the primary industry of White County until the summer of 1939, when oil was discovered in the Storms and Stinson fields in the Wabash River Bottoms. The population of Carmi doubled within two years, from 2,700 to 5,400, with corresponding increases at Crossville and Grayville—in 1940 it was said one could walk between these two towns by simply walking from rig to rig. Many of these workers migrated from previous oil booms in Texas and Oklahoma. As of 2013, fracking is underway near Carmi.

The current population of White County is a little over 17,000, with 6,500 in the county seat of Carmi. There is a high number of retired people, and many citizens work in the factories of Evansville or Mount Vernon, Indiana, located 45 and 25 miles to the east, respectively. Besides oil and agriculture, industries include auto parts manufacturing, plastics, a convenience store distribution center and underground coal mining.

Due to legal actions enforced by Indiana courts, White County, Illinois was also the site of the ill-fated Erie Canal Soda Pop Festival also known as the Bull Island Fest in 1972. Three county sheriffs were the only police force present at the festival.

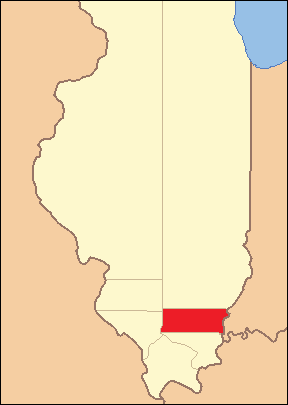
White County between its 1815 creation and 1818

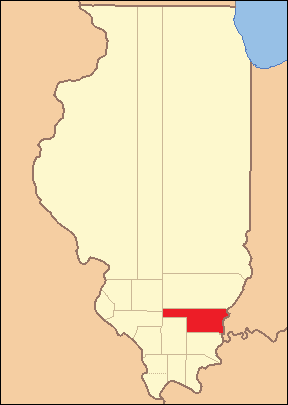
White County between 1818 and 1819

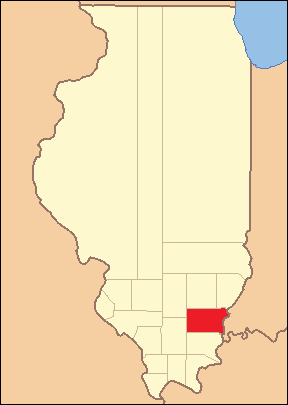
White County between 1819 and 1821

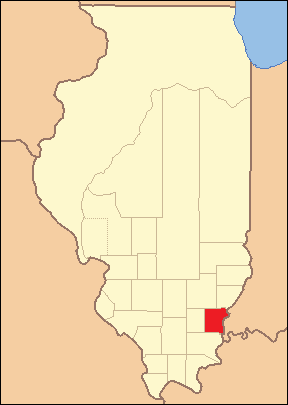
White County in 1821, reduced to its current borders by the creation of Hamilton County

== Geography ==
According to the U.S. Census Bureau, the county has a total area of 502 square miles (1,300 km^{2}), of which 495 square miles (1,280 km^{2}) is land and 7.1 square miles (18 km^{2}) (1.4%) is water.

=== Climate and weather ===
Carmi, Illinois

Climate chart (precipitation, max. and min. temperature)
J	F	M	A	M	J	J	A	S	O	N	D
3.1 40 22	3 46 26	4.4 57 35	4.2 68 44	5 77 53	4.6 86 63	4.6 89 67	3.6 88 64	3.1 81 57	2.6 70 44	4.2 56 36	4 44 26
- █ Average max. and min. temperatures in °F
- █ Precipitation totals in inches
- Source: The Weather Channel
Metric conversion
J	F	M	A	M	J	J	A	S	O	N	D
78 4 −6	76 8 −3	112 14 2	106 20 7	127 25 12	116 30 17	117 32 19	91 31 18	80 27 14	66 21 7	107 13 2	102 7 −3
- █ Average max. and min. temperatures in °C
- █ Precipitation totals in mm

In recent years, average temperatures in the county seat of Carmi have ranged from a low of 22 °F (−6 °C) in January to a high of 89 °F (32 °C) in July, although a record low of −20 °F (−29 °C) was recorded in January 1994 and a record high of 103 °F (39 °C) was recorded in August 2007. Average monthly precipitation ranged from 2.61 inches (66 mm) in October to 5.00 inches (127 mm) in May.

=== Transit ===
- Rides Mass Transit District

=== Major highways ===
- Interstate 64
- U.S. Highway 45
- Illinois Route 1
- Illinois Route 14
- Illinois Route 141

=== Adjacent counties ===
- Edwards County (north)
- Gibson County, Indiana (northeast, now separated by Bonpas Creek instead of the Wabash River)
- Posey County, Indiana (east, intermittent sections of water and land boundaries)
- Gallatin County (south)
- Saline County (southwest)
- Hamilton County (west)
- Wayne County (northwest)

== Demographics ==
Historical population
Census	Pop.	Note	%±
1820	4,828		—
1830	6,091		26.2%
1840	7,919		30.0%
1850	8,925		12.7%
1860	12,403		39.0%
1870	16,846		35.8%
1880	23,087		37.0%
1890	25,005		8.3%
1900	25,386		1.5%
1910	23,052		−9.2%
1920	20,081		−12.9%
1930	18,149		−9.6%
1940	20,027		10.3%
1950	20,935		4.5%
1960	19,373		−7.5%
1970	17,312		−10.6%
1980	17,864		3.2%
1990	16,522		−7.5%
2000	15,371		−7.0%
2010	14,665		−4.6%
2020	13,877		−5.4%
2025 (est.)	13,250	▼	−4.5%
U.S. Decennial Census; 1790-1960 1900-1990; 1990-2000 2010-2013

=== 2020 census ===
As of the 2020 census, the county had a population of 13,877. The median age was 45.1 years. 20.8% of residents were under the age of 18 and 24.0% of residents were 65 years of age or older. For every 100 females there were 95.9 males, and for every 100 females age 18 and over there were 92.5 males age 18 and over.

As of the 2020 census, the racial makeup of the county was 94.1% White, 0.7% Black or African American, 0.2% American Indian and Alaska Native, 0.5% Asian, 0.2% Native Hawaiian and Pacific Islander, 0.4% from some other race, and 4.0% from two or more races. Hispanic or Latino residents of any race comprised 1.4% of the population.

As of the 2020 census, 36.5% of residents lived in urban areas, while 63.5% lived in rural areas.

There were 5,846 households in the county, of which 26.2% had children under the age of 18 living in them. Of all households, 48.3% were married-couple households, 19.7% were households with a male householder and no spouse or partner present, and 26.3% were households with a female householder and no spouse or partner present. About 32.2% of all households were made up of individuals and 16.5% had someone living alone who was 65 years of age or older.

There were 6,751 housing units, of which 13.4% were vacant. Among occupied housing units, 77.1% were owner-occupied and 22.9% were renter-occupied. The homeowner vacancy rate was 2.6% and the rental vacancy rate was 10.5%.

=== Racial and ethnic composition ===
White County, Illinois – Racial and ethnic composition Note: the US Census treats Hispanic/Latino as an ethnic category. This table excludes Latinos from the racial categories and assigns them to a separate category. Hispanics/Latinos may be of any race.
Race / Ethnicity (NH = Non-Hispanic)	Pop 1980	Pop 1990	Pop 2000	Pop 2010	Pop 2020	% 1980	% 1990	% 2000	% 2010	% 2020
White alone (NH)	17,665	16,352	15,033	14,308	13,007	98.89%	98.97%	97.80%	97.57%	93.73%
Black or African American alone (NH)	28	41	40	37	91	0.16%	0.25%	0.26%	0.25%	0.66%
Native American or Alaska Native alone (NH)	39	33	40	40	22	0.22%	0.20%	0.26%	0.27%	0.16%
Asian alone (NH)	23	35	25	31	65	0.13%	0.21%	0.16%	0.21%	0.47%
Native Hawaiian or Pacific Islander alone (NH)	x	x	1	5	18	x	x	0.01%	0.03%	0.13%
Other race alone (NH)	7	3	1	2	15	0.04%	0.02%	0.01%	0.01%	0.11%
Mixed race or Multiracial (NH)	x	x	128	84	471	x	x	0.83%	0.57%	3.39%
Hispanic or Latino (any race)	102	58	103	158	188	0.57%	0.35%	0.67%	1.08%	1.35%
Total	17,864	16,522	15,371	14,665	13,877	100.00%	100.00%	100.00%	100.00%	100.00%

=== 2010 census ===
As of the 2010 United States census, there were 14,665 people, 6,313 households, and 4,142 families residing in the county. The population density was 29.6 inhabitants per square mile (11.4/km^{2}). There were 7,181 housing units at an average density of 14.5 per square mile (5.6/km^{2}). The racial makeup of the county was 98.1% white, 0.4% black or African American, 0.3% American Indian, 0.2% Asian, 0.2% from other races, and 0.7% from two or more races. Those of Hispanic or Latino origin made up 1.1% of the population. In terms of ancestry, 25.5% were German, 15.8% were Irish, 14.0% were American, and 11.8% were English.

Of the 6,313 households, 27.3% had children under the age of 18 living with them, 52.1% were married couples living together, 9.5% had a female householder with no husband present, 34.4% were non-families, and 30.5% of all households were made up of individuals. The average household size was 2.26 and the average family size was 2.78. The median age was 45.2 years.

The median income for a household in the county was $39,728 and the median income for a family was $48,666. Males had a median income of $41,712 versus $26,168 for females. The per capita income for the county was $22,081. About 10.1% of families and 14.8% of the population were below the poverty line, including 25.7% of those under age 18 and 6.3% of those age 65 or over.

== Communities ==
=== Cities ===
- Carmi
- Grayville (Partially in Edwards County)

=== Villages ===
- Burnt Prairie
- Crossville
- Enfield
- Maunie
- Mill Shoals
- Norris City
- Phillipstown
- Springerton

=== Unincorporated towns ===
- Brownsville
- Emma
- Epworth
- Herald
- Rising Sun

=== Townships ===
White County is divided into ten townships:

- Burnt Prairie
- Carmi
- Emma
- Enfield
- Gray
- Hawthorne
- Heralds Prairie
- Indian Creek
- Mill Shoals
- Phillips

== Politics ==
White County is powerfully Republican and as of 2026 has shut out Democrats at both the federal and state for twenty years. Donald Trump won more than three quarters of its vote in all of his presidential bids.

However, the Republican monopoly is relatively recent. White County began as a Whig stronghold before shifting to the Democrats when the former party collapsed. Democrats would win all statewide elections until 1920, when it became more competitive. From 1920 to 2004, it voted for the winner of the presidential race in all but two elections.

United States presidential election results for White County, Illinois
Year	Republican		Democratic		Third party(ies)	
Year	No.	%	No.	%	No.	%
1892	2,215	40.40%	2,954	53.88%	314	5.73%
1896	2,771	44.44%	3,421	54.87%	43	0.69%
1900	2,658	44.94%	3,170	53.59%	87	1.47%
1904	2,515	45.19%	2,774	49.84%	277	4.98%
1908	2,436	43.50%	2,934	52.39%	230	4.11%
1912	591	11.16%	2,708	51.11%	1,999	37.73%
1916	4,137	43.76%	5,066	53.59%	250	2.64%
1920	4,494	51.23%	4,148	47.29%	130	1.48%
1924	3,780	44.71%	4,377	51.77%	297	3.51%
1928	4,177	53.01%	3,666	46.53%	36	0.46%
1932	3,320	35.71%	5,909	63.55%	69	0.74%
1936	4,322	39.62%	6,511	59.68%	76	0.70%
1940	5,459	47.50%	5,909	51.41%	125	1.09%
1944	5,139	51.12%	4,822	47.97%	91	0.91%
1948	4,498	48.17%	4,761	50.99%	79	0.85%
1952	6,141	58.87%	4,284	41.07%	6	0.06%
1956	6,128	56.13%	4,778	43.77%	11	0.10%
1960	5,810	54.93%	4,756	44.97%	11	0.10%
1964	4,000	40.15%	5,963	59.85%	0	0.00%
1968	5,351	53.77%	3,837	38.56%	764	7.68%
1972	6,052	62.10%	3,678	37.74%	16	0.16%
1976	4,600	46.31%	5,306	53.42%	27	0.27%
1980	5,279	58.19%	3,463	38.17%	330	3.64%
1984	5,500	61.23%	3,457	38.48%	26	0.29%
1988	4,354	51.04%	4,144	48.58%	33	0.39%
1992	3,057	34.70%	4,308	48.89%	1,446	16.41%
1996	2,878	39.15%	3,553	48.33%	921	12.53%
2000	4,521	59.20%	2,958	38.73%	158	2.07%
2004	5,180	62.40%	3,071	37.00%	50	0.60%
2008	3,987	53.50%	3,315	44.48%	151	2.03%
2012	4,731	66.80%	2,188	30.90%	163	2.30%
2016	5,640	76.89%	1,412	19.25%	283	3.86%
2020	5,791	77.93%	1,517	20.41%	123	1.66%
2024	5,586	78.84%	1,390	19.62%	109	1.54%

== Education ==
School districts (unified K-12 except when otherwise specified) include:

- Carmi-White County Community Unit School District 5
- Gallatin Community Unit School District 7
- Grayville Community Unit School District 1
- Norris City-Omaha-Enfield Community Unit School District 3
- Fairfield Community High School District 225 (secondary grades only)
- New Hope Community Consolidated School District 6 (elementary grades only)

== See also ==
- National Register of Historic Places listings in White County, Illinois
