= Maunie, Illinois =

Maunie
- Village
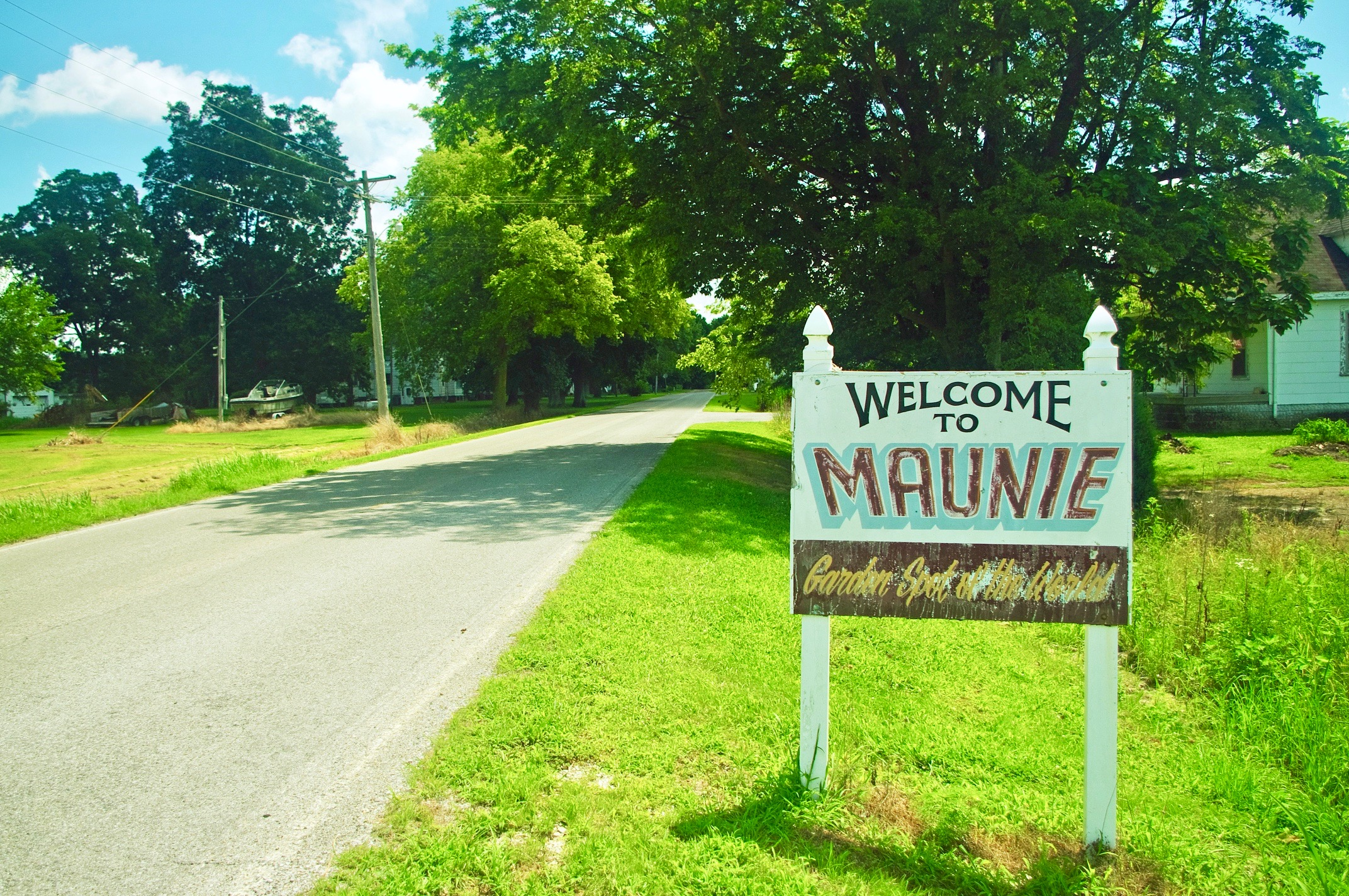
- Welcome sign

- Location of Maunie in White County, Illinois.
- Coordinates: 38°02′08″N 88°02′44″W
- Country: United States
- State: Illinois
- County: White

Area
  - Total: 0.17 sq mi (0.43 km^{2})
  - Land: 0.16 sq mi (0.41 km^{2})
  - Water: 0.0077 sq mi (0.02 km^{2})
- Elevation: 371 ft (113 m)

Population (2020)
  - Total: 91
  - Density: 573.4/sq mi (221.41/km^{2})
- Time zone: UTC-6 (CST)
  - Summer (DST): UTC-5 (CDT)
- ZIP code: 62861
- Area code: 618
- FIPS code: 17-47592
- GNIS ID: 2399276

Maunie is a village in White County, Illinois, United States. As of the 2020 census, Maunie had a population of 91.

== History ==
The village name is a portmanteau of the first names of Maude Sheridan and Jennie Pumphrey, wives of two early settlers (John Pumphrey and G.S. Sheridan). A post office was established at Maunie in 1893. The village incorporated in 1901.

On January 18, 1929, at 11.20 a.m., a tornado hit Maunie, killing two school children.

== Geography ==
Maunie is located in eastern Illinois along the Wabash River, which marks the Illinois-Indiana state line.

According to the 2010 census, Maunie has a total area of 0.16 square miles (0.41 km^{2}), all land.

== Demographics ==
Historical population
Census	Pop.	Note	%±
1910	512		—
1920	480		−6.2%
1930	455		−5.2%
1940	521		14.5%
1950	412		−20.9%
1960	363		−11.9%
1970	275		−24.2%
1980	225		−18.2%
1990	119		−47.1%
2000	177		48.7%
2010	139		−21.5%
2020	91		−34.5%
U.S. Decennial Census

As of the census of 2000, there were 177 people, 77 households, and 48 families residing in the village. The population density was 1,096.2 inhabitants per square mile (423.2/km^{2}). There were 98 housing units at an average density of 607.0 per square mile (234.4/km^{2}). The racial makeup of the village was 94.35% White, 1.69% African American, 1.13% Native American, 0.56% Asian, and 2.26% from two or more races. Hispanic or Latino of any race were 0.56% of the population.

There were 77 households, out of which 23.4% had children under the age of 18 living with them, 50.6% were married couples living together, 10.4% had a female householder with no husband present, and 36.4% were non-families. 31.2% of all households were made up of individuals, and 11.7% had someone living alone who was 65 years of age or older. The average household size was 2.30 and the average family size was 2.84.

In the village, the population was spread out, with 20.9% under the age of 18, 6.2% from 18 to 24, 27.7% from 25 to 44, 28.2% from 45 to 64, and 16.9% who were 65 years of age or older. The median age was 43 years. For every 100 females, there were 113.3 males. For every 100 females age 18 and over, there were 100.0 males.

The median income for a household in the village was $15,500, and the median income for a family was $19,375. Males had a median income of $22,143 versus $15,417 for females. The per capita income for the village was $10,165. About 20.4% of families and 26.0% of the population were below the poverty line, including 19.2% of those under the age of eighteen and 46.7% of those 65 or over.

== Education ==
It is in the Carmi-White County Community Unit School District 5. The district's comprehensive high school is Carmi-White County High School.
