= Carmi, Illinois =

- City
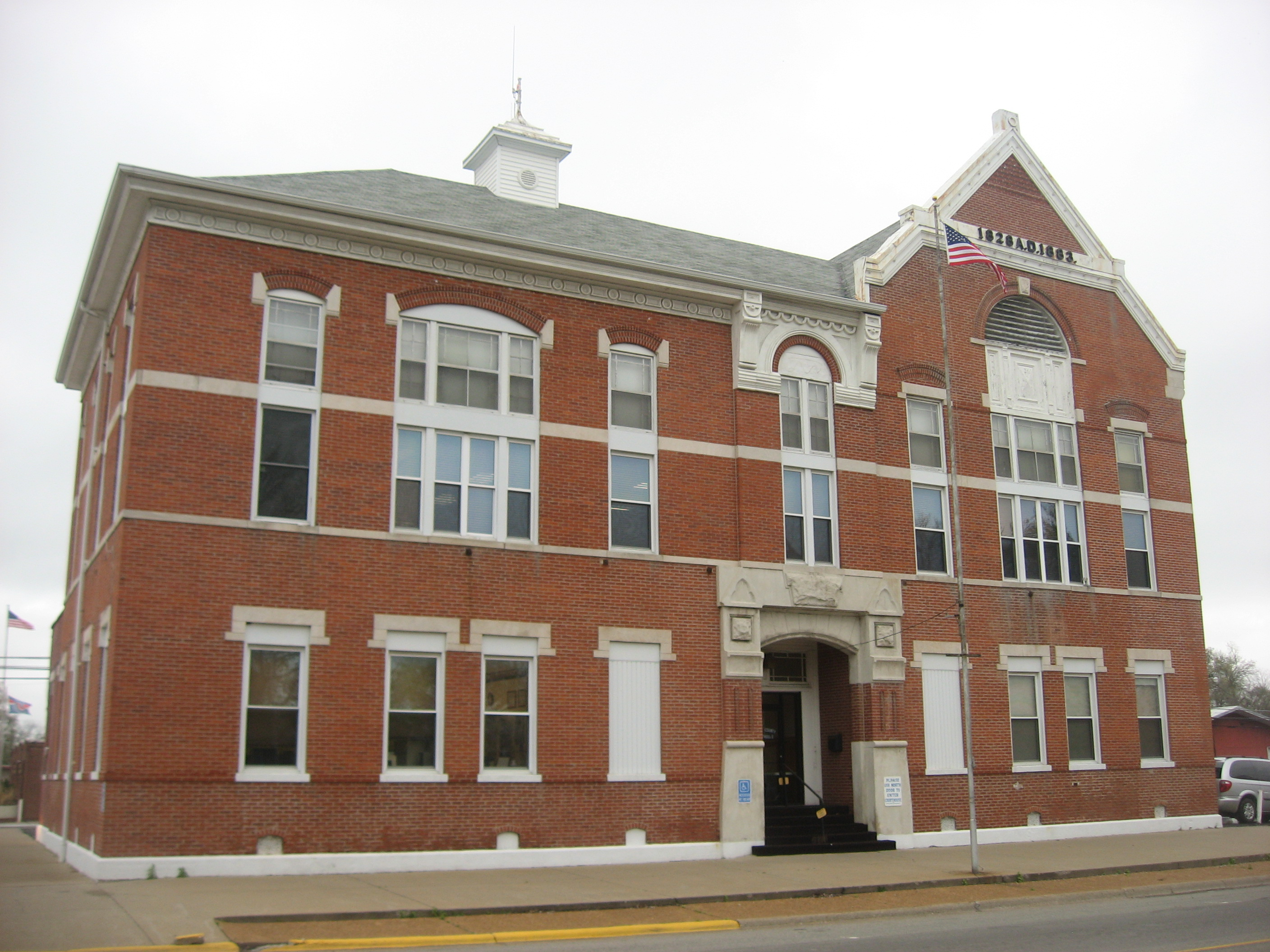
- White County Courthouse
- Etymology: Biblical: Carmi, nephew of Jacob.
- Motto: Where northern vigor meets southern hospitality
- Interactive map of Carmi, Illinois
- Location within Illinois Location within the United States
- Coordinates: 38°05′10″N 88°10′19″W
- Country: United States
- State: Illinois
- County: White
- Founded: 1816

Government
  - Type: Mayor-council government

Area
  - Total: 2.62 sq mi (6.79 km^{2})
  - Land: 2.59 sq mi (6.71 km^{2})
  - Water: 0.031 sq mi (0.08 km^{2}) 1.22%
- Elevation: 390 ft (120 m)

Population (2020)
  - Total: 4,865
  - Density: 1,878.8/sq mi (725.41/km^{2})
- Time zone: UTC-6 (CST)
  - Summer (DST): UTC-5 (CDT)
- ZIP code: 62821
- Area code: 618
- FIPS code: 17-11293
- GNIS ID: 2393751
- Website: www.cityofcarmi.org

Carmi (CAR-mī) is a city in and the county seat of White County, Illinois, United States, along the Little Wabash River. As of the 2020 census, Carmi had a population of 4,865..

== History ==
Carmi post office has been in operation since 1817. Since 1939 a WPA oil on canvas mural called Service to the Farmer by Davenport Griffen has been displayed in the post office. Carmi is a biblical name.

== Geography ==
According to the 2010 census, Carmi has a total area of 2.531 square miles (6.56 km^{2}), of which 2.5 square miles (6.47 km^{2}) (or 98.78%) is land and 0.031 square miles (0.08 km^{2}) (or 1.22%) is water.

=== Climate ===
Precipitation ranges from 79 mm (3.1 in) to 131 mm. Snowfall reaches 12 cm (0.39 ft) in February.

Climate data for Carmi, Illinois (1991–2020 normals, extremes 1987–present)
Month	Jan	Feb	Mar	Apr	May	Jun	Jul	Aug	Sep	Oct	Nov	Dec	Year
Record high °F (°C)	72 (22)	77 (25)	82 (28)	89 (32)	93 (34)	108 (42)	106 (41)	103 (39)	100 (38)	96 (36)	84 (29)	74 (23)	108 (42)
Mean maximum °F (°C)	63.2 (17.3)	68.9 (20.5)	76.4 (24.7)	83.2 (28.4)	89.1 (31.7)	94.3 (34.6)	95.0 (35.0)	95.1 (35.1)	92.8 (33.8)	86.0 (30.0)	74.2 (23.4)	65.1 (18.4)	97.3 (36.3)
Mean daily maximum °F (°C)	41.1 (5.1)	46.0 (7.8)	56.1 (13.4)	68.0 (20.0)	76.8 (24.9)	85.3 (29.6)	87.6 (30.9)	86.8 (30.4)	81.4 (27.4)	70.1 (21.2)	56.2 (13.4)	45.0 (7.2)	66.7 (19.3)
Daily mean °F (°C)	31.2 (−0.4)	34.7 (1.5)	44.3 (6.8)	55.5 (13.1)	65.1 (18.4)	73.9 (23.3)	76.7 (24.8)	74.9 (23.8)	68.1 (20.1)	56.4 (13.6)	44.1 (6.7)	35.0 (1.7)	55.0 (12.8)
Mean daily minimum °F (°C)	21.2 (−6.0)	23.4 (−4.8)	32.5 (0.3)	43.0 (6.1)	53.5 (11.9)	62.5 (16.9)	65.7 (18.7)	63.0 (17.2)	54.8 (12.7)	42.8 (6.0)	32.1 (0.1)	25.0 (−3.9)	43.3 (6.3)
Mean minimum °F (°C)	2.8 (−16.2)	7.7 (−13.5)	16.7 (−8.5)	28.4 (−2.0)	38.7 (3.7)	49.9 (9.9)	56.7 (13.7)	53.9 (12.2)	41.2 (5.1)	28.8 (−1.8)	18.5 (−7.5)	8.2 (−13.2)	−1.2 (−18.4)
Record low °F (°C)	−20 (−29)	−9 (−23)	−3 (−19)	18 (−8)	32 (0)	41 (5)	50 (10)	47 (8)	31 (−1)	22 (−6)	7 (−14)	−17 (−27)	−20 (−29)
Average precipitation inches (mm)	3.50 (89)	3.11 (79)	4.37 (111)	5.17 (131)	5.16 (131)	4.31 (109)	4.43 (113)	3.50 (89)	3.22 (82)	3.43 (87)	4.22 (107)	3.90 (99)	48.32 (1,227)
Average snowfall inches (cm)	2.5 (6.4)	4.9 (12)	1.8 (4.6)	0.0 (0.0)	0.0 (0.0)	0.0 (0.0)	0.0 (0.0)	0.0 (0.0)	0.0 (0.0)	0.2 (0.51)	0.2 (0.51)	2.1 (5.3)	11.7 (30)
Average precipitation days (≥ 0.01 in)	9.9	9.1	11.2	10.6	12.3	10.5	9.6	8.3	7.1	8.1	8.7	10.2	115.6
Average snowy days (≥ 0.1 in)	2.5	2.4	0.5	0.0	0.0	0.0	0.0	0.0	0.0	0.0	0.2	1.8	7.4
Source: NOAA

== Demographics ==
Historical population
Census	Pop.	Note	%±
1880	2,512		—
1890	2,785		10.9%
1900	2,939		5.5%
1910	2,833		−3.6%
1920	2,667		−5.9%
1930	2,932		9.9%
1940	4,098		39.8%
1950	5,574		36.0%
1960	6,152		10.4%
1970	6,033		−1.9%
1980	6,107		1.2%
1990	5,564		−8.9%
2000	5,422		−2.6%
2010	5,240		−3.4%
2020	4,865		−7.2%
U.S. Decennial Census

=== 2020 census ===
As of the 2020 census, Carmi had a population of 4,865. The median age was 44.7 years. 20.5% of residents were under the age of 18 and 25.6% of residents were 65 years of age or older. For every 100 females there were 87.4 males, and for every 100 females age 18 and over there were 83.3 males age 18 and over.

99.9% of residents lived in urban areas, while 0.1% lived in rural areas.

There were 2,109 households in Carmi, of which 24.3% had children under the age of 18 living in them. Of all households, 39.7% were married-couple households, 20.4% were households with a male householder and no spouse or partner present, and 34.0% were households with a female householder and no spouse or partner present. About 39.1% of all households were made up of individuals and 20.5% had someone living alone who was 65 years of age or older.

There were 2,431 housing units, of which 13.2% were vacant. The homeowner vacancy rate was 3.4% and the rental vacancy rate was 10.6%.

Racial composition as of the 2020 census
Race	Number	Percent
White	4,530	93.1%
Black or African American	27	0.6%
American Indian and Alaska Native	7	0.1%
Asian	41	0.8%
Native Hawaiian and Other Pacific Islander	9	0.2%
Some other race	23	0.5%
Two or more races	228	4.7%
Hispanic or Latino (of any race)	87	1.8%

=== 2000 census ===
As of the census of 2000, there were 5,422 people, 2,390 households, and 1,477 families residing in the city. The population density was 2,187.7 inhabitants per square mile (844.7/km^{2}). There were 2,667 housing units at an average density of 1,076.1 per square mile (415.5/km^{2}). The racial makeup of the city was 98.30% White, 0.48% African American, 0.35% Native American, 0.24% Asian, 0.06% from other races, and 0.57% from two or more races. Hispanic or Latino of any race were 0.65% of the population.

There were 2,390 households, out of which 23.8% had children under the age of 18 living with them, 49.7% were married couples living together, 9.2% had a female householder with no husband present, and 38.2% were non-families. 35.3% of all households were made up of individuals, and 20.3% had someone living alone who was 65 years of age or older. The average household size was 2.16 and the average family size was 2.78.

In the city, the population was spread out, with 20.4% under the age of 18, 8.2% from 18 to 24, 23.7% from 25 to 44, 21.7% from 45 to 64, and 25.9% who were 65 years of age or older. The median age was 43 years. For every 100 females, there were 84.4 males. For every 100 females age 18 and over, there were 81.7 males.

The median income for a household in the city was $25,667, and the median income for a family was $32,456. Males had a median income of $30,735 versus $16,693 for females. The per capita income for the city was $15,886. About 11.7% of families and 15.1% of the population were below the poverty line, including 21.4% of those under age 18 and 11.6% of those age 65 or over.

== Education ==
=== College ===
- Southeastern Illinois College David L. Stanley White County Center

=== Public ===
- Carmi-White County Community School District #5:
  - Carmi-White County High School - grades 7–12
  - Washington Attendance Center - grades 4–6
  - Jefferson Attendance Center - grades 2–3
  - Lincoln Attendance Center - grades K-1

=== Private ===
- Carmi Christian School

== Media ==
=== Radio ===
- WRUL 97.3 FM
- WROY 1460 AM

=== Print ===
- Carmi Times
- Carmi Chronicle

== Notable people ==
- King Brockett, professional baseball player
- Orlando Burrell, White County judge, White County Sheriff, congressman
- Roy Clippinger, congressman
- Everton Conger, Union Army Lieutenant colonel, federal territorial judge
- Caswell J. Crebs, Illinois Supreme Court justice
- John M. Crebs, Union Army Lieutenant colonel, congressman
- Josh Elder, comic book creator
- Ivan A. Elliott, Illinois Attorney General
- Frederick J. Karch, Brigadier General, USMC (World War II, Vietnam War)
- Samuel D. Lockwood, Illinois Attorney General, Secretary of State, and Supreme Court justice
- Glenn Poshard, state senator, congressman, and president of Southern Illinois University
- John McCracken Robinson, senator, Illinois Supreme Court justice
- Run Kid Run, Christian band
- Side Walk Slam, punk rock band
- Charles Peyton, adult film actor, fashion model
- James R. Williams, congressman
- William Wilson, Chief Justice of the Illinois Supreme Court

== See also ==
- Carmi Air Force Station
- Erie Canal Soda Pop Festival
- Little Egypt
