= George W. Barrett =

American car thief and murder (1887–1936)

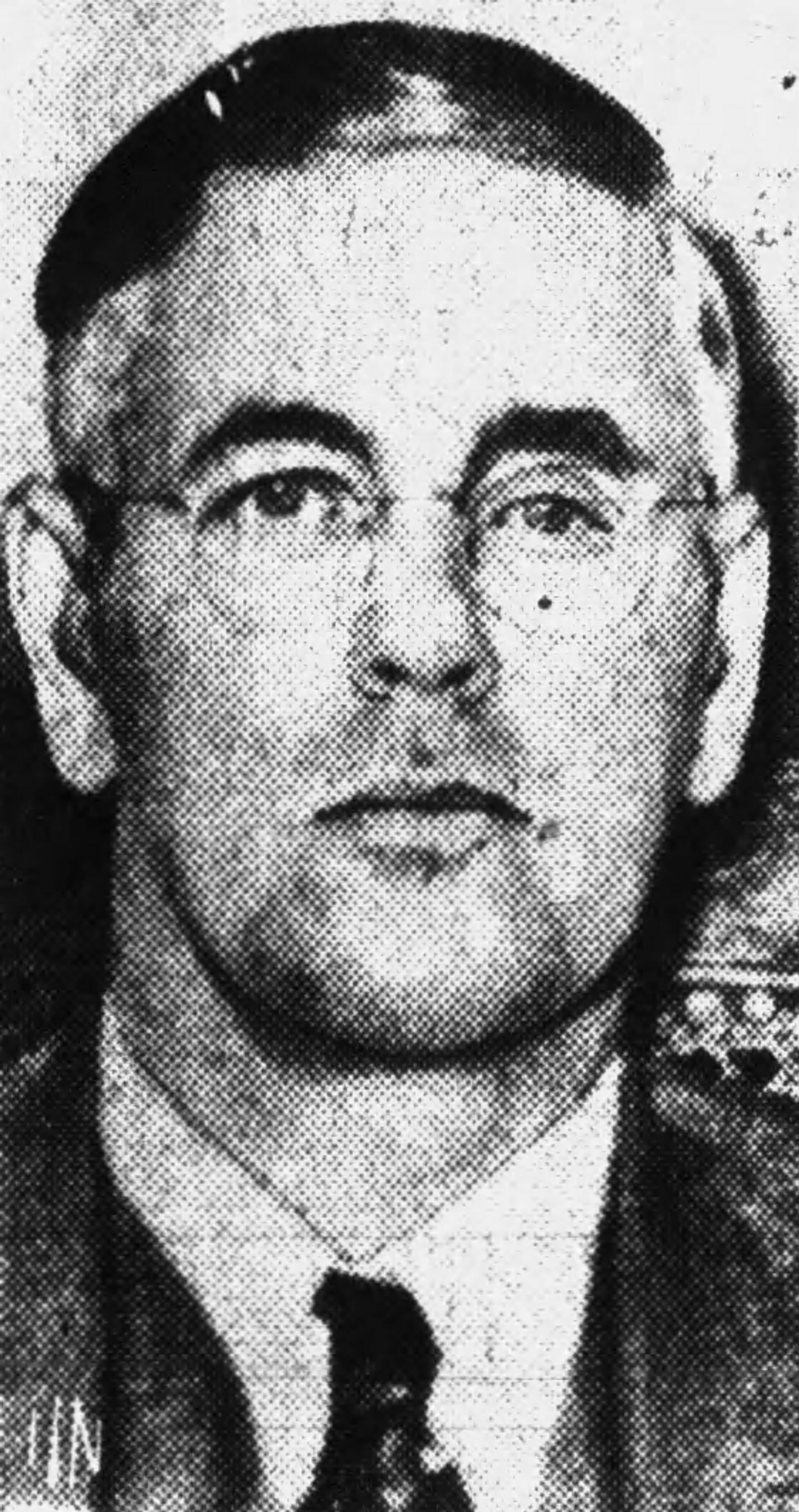
- Born: February 28, 1887; Clay County, Kentucky, U.S.
- Died: March 24, 1936 (aged 49); Marion County Jail, Indiana, U.S.
- Occupation: Streetcar conductor
- Status: Executed by hanging
- Motive: To avoid arrest
- Conviction: First degree murder of a federal employee
- Penalty: Death by hanging

George W. Barrett (February 28, 1887 – March 24, 1936), also known as "The Diamond King" and "Bad George," was an American car thief and murderer who became the first person sentenced to death by hanging under a congressional act that made it a capital offense to kill a federal agent.

== Early life ==
Barrett was born in Kentucky, one of at least seven children of William Barrett and Nancy Jane Bowling. He had worked as a streetcar conductor in Cincinnati and was a "career hoodlum, moonshiner, car thief and murderer" prior to killing the federal agent. He was known as the "Diamond King" because he supposedly carried diamonds in his pocket.

On September 2, 1930, Barrett shot and killed his own 71-year-old mother (who had reportedly whipped his 11-year-old son) and pistol whipped his sister Rachel, whom he shot through the ear. His two brothers posted a $500 reward for his capture. After eight months of being on the run, he turned himself in the next spring and was charged with killing his mother and wounding his sister. The trial resulted in a hung jury. It was later reported that he had been tried for killing both his mother and sister. He admitted to shooting his mother in self-defense, but denied killing his sister, whom he said had died of pneumonia. According to records, Rachael Barrett Maupin did die of double bronchial pneumonia on October 18, 1930, a month after the attack.

== Shootout ==
Barrett came to the attention of the FBI because he was wanted for car theft and interstate transportation of vehicles as far as California. Barrett would buy a model of a popular car and then steal an identical one. He would then sell the stolen car to an unsuspecting buyer using the papers of the car he bought legitimately. He had warrants for his arrest in San Diego and in Indiana.

On August 16, 1935, FBI agents Nelson B. Klein and Donald McGovern had tracked Barrett to West College Corner, Indiana, and called the sheriff for assistance. Klein spotted Barrett standing by a car and gave chase on foot, not realizing that Barrett was armed with a .45 caliber Colt revolver. Barrett ran to a home owned by Mrs. Agatha McDonough and barricaded himself behind a garage, where he began to shoot at Klein and McGovern. Klein, a 37-year-old agent from Cincinnati, was shot six times in his chest and arms. The mortally wounded Klein fired back, along with McGovern. Barrett was shot in the knees and had two broken legs.

Klein died on the spot. Homeowner Agatha McDonough was the first to reach Barrett, who was lying wounded in her yard. According to McDonough, Barrett bragged to her, "I beat him to the trigger. I shot him."

Shortly thereafter, the local police arrived, and Barrett was taken to a local hospital and treated for his wounds. After several days he was released and then taken to Indianapolis, where he was tried and convicted of the murder of a federal agent.

== Trial and execution ==
On December 7, 1935, Barrett was convicted of first degree murder for the death of special agent Nelson B. Klein by a federal jury.

The state of Indiana adopted the electric chair as execution method in 1913, and was unprepared to carry out the hanging as required in Barrett's federal sentence. On March 24, 1936, Illinois farmer Phil Hanna, who had taken up the study of hanging executions as a hobby, served as volunteer executioner.

For his customary last meal, Barrett ordered the "biggest steak in town", french fries, stewed corn, lettuce salad, and coffee. According to contemporary reports, he gave half of the steak to a jail cat. A later interview suggests Barrett did not eat the steak at all, but a reporter present for his execution found the steak in the jail's kitchen and helped himself to it.

Barrett was still crippled from his wounds and had to be carried to the gallows on a stretcher and supported by deputy marshals. His last request was to see his younger brother, John, but no response was received to a telegram sent before his execution. Before the trap was sprung at 12:02 pm, Barrett was asked if he had any last words, but did not respond. He was pronounced dead, at age 49, before about 50 official witnesses.

== See also ==
- Capital punishment by the United States federal government
- List of people executed by the United States federal government
- List of people executed in Indiana (pre-1972)
- List of people executed in the United States in 1936
