= Phil Hanna =

American volunteer hangman of 70 criminals (1873–1948)

George Phillip Hanna (September 16, 1873 – September 6, 1948) was an American farmer and volunteer hangman who traveled across the United States to facilitate as many as 70 hangings, including the final U.S. public hanging of Rainey Bethea in 1936.

Hanna was known for his wealth in his home of Epworth, Illinois, where he owned the family farm he and his brother inherited. He directed a bank, and became a car dealer after being the county's first person with an automobile.

== Early life ==
George Phillip Hanna was born on September 16, 1873, to George and Mary Hanna of Epworth, Illinois. He grew up on the family's 2000 acre farm, purchased in 1808 by a family member who had immigrated from Ireland. He and his brother Harry inherited the land.

== Volunteer hangman career ==
In 1896, 22-year-old Hanna witnessed a botched execution where the inexperienced official tied a noose incorrectly, causing the man to slowly die of strangulation before the disturbed crowd. He became passionate about better processes and began testing hanging as a hobby, using plow lines and dummies made of straw.

On March 26, 1920, he witnessed an execution in Poplar Bluff, Missouri, in which the rope broke, causing the man to fall to the ground. Hanna went to retrieve the severely injured man, who reportedly stated, "Hurry up, boys, and get me out of my misery" according to later press reports. Hanna always brought multiple ropes to hangings he facilitated and tested them extensively for strength.

In Spring 1921, Hanna officiated his first hanging in Carmi, Illinois, killing his neighbor, Frank Lowhone. His skill attracted the attention of sheriffs and officials.

=== Practices ===
Hanna was requested to perform hangings across the Midwest and South, where officials were untrained in public hangings. Hanna did not accept payment for this work, and brought his own supplies and equipment. He frequently described the practice as humanitarian. He was not involved in the springing of the trap, and instead had a different person perform this task.

Hanna was meticulous, thoroughly testing the gallows before hangings and knotting the noose under the neck and left ear to ensure the falling body's weight broke the neck in a square jerk. He provided expensive hoods for the criminals to wear while hung, which were sewn by his sister-in-law and later by his wife, and allowed them to choose between a white or black hood. He performed many of his hangings with a $65 black hemp rope, .75 inches thick and handmade by a St. Louis seller. He would test the rope repeatedly with heavy sandbags.

Hanna spent the criminal's final hours with him, sometimes staying overnight. He developed a rapport and expressed that he intended to help them. He advised them on certain aspects of the event, such as standing in the very middle of the trap so they fell straight through. Previously at one of Hanna's early hangings in 1921, a victim hit the side and had a drawn out death.

Hanna eventually developed his own equipment including a portable 15-foot scaffold, which he transported to hangings around the country.

=== Notable hangings ===
In 1928, Hanna facilitated the execution of the prominent mobster Charlie Birger, who agreed when Hanna asked to be forgiven for what had to be done.

In 1936, Hanna performed his 69th execution on George W. Barrett, a car thief and feudist who was hung in the gallows at Marion County Jail in Indianapolis. Barrett was the first person sentenced to death row for killing a United States officer, which a new Federal law had made a capital offense by hanging.

In 1936, he facilitated the highly publicized execution of Rainey Bethea in 1936, the last criminal to be publicly executed in the United States. The event drew national media and crowds estimated at as many as 20,000 people.

=== Beliefs ===
Hanna believed that hangings should be public for all to view because he felt they were crime deterrents.

In a newspaper article he wrote in 1921, Hanna explained, "I do not do this through blood lust but simply because the chance for human interest study at first attracted me and later I have been able to be of assistance in making the executions more humane."

In 1932 Hanna said, "I haven't much nerve ... I dread hangings. I'm upset for days before and afterwards."

He came to believe hanging was more humane than electrical chair execution upon witnessing the latter once and never returning again. Though he initially said "What a contraption!" he became concerned that the body lunged forward from the chair's current, and that its straps could break.

== Personal life ==
Hanna was a bachelor until age 54, when he married Martha Crebbs. They moved from the farm house to a cottage on the property. She sewed the expensive black and white hoods that victims wore when executed.

He was known to have a fear of pain, and would struggle at home in the days after a hanging with anxiety. He built houses for the birds on his property rather than shooting them. He enjoyed radio.

In his den, he displayed a collection of items from the executions he had attended and facilitated, including a machine gun that he was given by Charlie Birger.

Hanna was a well-known wealthy businessman, and served as director of First National Bank of Carmi. He owned the first automobile in White County. He was described as generous.

=== Automobiles ===
He bought his first car around 1903 in Evansville. While driving it home, the car had transmission problems. A man suggested Hanna put sand on the transmission like was done with threshing machines. However, this ruined the transmission. In 1912, he became a car dealer.

=== Death ===
Shortly after his wife left him, Hanna was brought to an Evansville hospital for sickness. He reportedly shook his bed's railings in frustration and became belligerent before dying of hardened arteries in 1948 at age 74.
