= Charles W. Anderson Jr. =

American lawyer, politician, and activist (1907–1960)

Member of the Kentucky House of Representatives
- In office January 1, 1936 – May 2, 1946
- Preceded by: George R. McIntosh
- Succeeded by: Dennis Henderson
- Constituency: 58th district (1936–1944); 42nd district (1944–1946)

Personal details
- Born: May 26, 1907 Louisville, Kentucky
- Died: June 14, 1960 (aged 53) Shelby County, Kentucky
- Resting place: Eastern Cemetery
- Party: Republican
- Education: Wilberforce University; Howard University School of Law

Charles W. Anderson Jr. (May 26, 1907 – June 14, 1960) was an African-American lawyer, state legislator and civil rights leader in Kentucky. A member of the Republican Party, he served in the Kentucky House of Representatives from 1936 until 1946, and was the first African American elected to the Kentucky legislature. He later served as an alternate delegate to the United Nations and as president of the Louisville NAACP branch.

== Early life and education ==
Anderson was born May 26, 1907, in Louisville, Kentucky to Dr. Charles W. Anderson and Tabitha Murphy Anderson. His father was a doctor and his mother a schoolteacher. He attended Kentucky State College (now Kentucky State University) and graduated from Wilberforce University in Ohio before moving to Washington, D.C to obtain his law degree from Howard University School of Law.

== Career ==
Anderson returned to Kentucky and was admitted to the bar February 1932. He then started his own law practice in Louisville in 1933. Around this time he became president of the National Association for the Advancement of Colored People.

In April 1935, Anderson decided to run for a seat in the Kentucky House representing the fifty-eighth district. He was a Republican and ran against four Democrats: Charles E. Tucker, Rev. Ernest Grundy, Dr. Richard P. Beckman and James D. Bailey. Anderson won the seat and was the only Republican to be elected to represent Jefferson County that session, a first for many years. He was the first African-American to be elected into the Kentucky legislature. He went on to serve six two-year sessions in total from 1936 until 1946.

Anderson worked to pass legislation outlawing public hanging in Kentucky and to provide state aid for African Americans seeking higher degrees out-of-state due to Kentucky segregation laws. He also passed legislation equalizing the pay of teachers independent of skin color and allowing women to keep their positions as public school teachers after marriage. He helped establish new African American units in the Kentucky National Guard for the first time. While he was a representative he was one of several African-American lawyers to appeal the hanging of Rainey Bethea, who was the last person publicly executed in the United States, but on August 10, 1936, he announced that all appeals had been exhausted.

Anderson served as president of the National Negro Bar Association for two terms starting in 1943. U.S. President Dwight D. Eisenhower appointed him an alternate delegate to the United Nations in the 1950s, and he served as the president of Louisville's NAACP branch.

Anderson resigned from his seat in the house in 1946 to become the Assistant Commonwealth Attorney for Jefferson County, another first for an African-American in Kentucky. Three years later in 1949 he was nominated for the position of judge for the third municipal district, but was narrowly defeated at the election.

== Family life and death ==
Anderson had two children with his second wife. His half-sister Florence was an educator. Anderson was killed June 14, 1960 when his car was hit by a train at a crossing in Shelby County. He was buried at Eastern Cemetery. There is a historical marker in Louisville (No. 1964) marking his as the first African American elected in the state.

== See also ==
- African-American officeholders (1900–1959)
