= Rainey Bethea =

Last United States criminal to be publicly executed (c. 1909–1936)

- Bethea in August 14, 1936. shortly before leaving the Jefferson County jail for his execution.
- Born: c. October 16, 1909; Roanoke, Virginia, U.S.
- Died: August 14, 1936 (aged 26); Owensboro, Kentucky, U.S.
- Resting place: Owensboro Cemetery, Owensboro, Ky. (also known as City Cemetery and "Potter's Field")
- Known for: Being one of the last people to be publicly executed in the United States
- Status: Executed by hanging (August 14, 1936; 90 years ago)
- Conviction: Rape (Note: Trial testimony alleged that Bethea had committed the additional crimes of murder, burglary, and robbery, but he was neither indicted nor convicted of those crimes.)
- Penalty: Death

Rainey Bethea (c. 1909 (Note: Bethea's birthdate has not been conclusively proven. He variously gave his birth year as 1909 to 1913. His Kentucky prison record states he was born October 16, 1909, but this might have been an approximation. The birthdate on his death certificate is blank. The 1910 United States Census for Bethea Township, Dillon County, South Carolina, lists a "Rainey Bethea," age 5, step son of Strans Bethea and son of Beulah Bethea. Similarly, a Rainey Bethea, Jr., age 11, son of Rainey Bethea, Sr., appears in the 1920 United States Census for Reaves Township, Marion County, South Carolina.) – August 14, 1936), was the last person publicly executed in Kentucky. Bethea, who confessed to the rape and killing of a 70-year-old woman named Lishia Edwards, was convicted of her rape and publicly hanged in Owensboro, Kentucky.

== Biography ==
=== Early life ===
Little is known about Bethea's life before he arrived in Owensboro in 1933. Born around 1909 in Roanoke, Virginia, Bethea was an African-American man orphaned after the death of his mother in 1919 and his father in 1926. He worked for the Rutherford family and lived in their basement for about a year, and then he moved to a cabin behind the house of a man named Emmett Wells. He worked as a laborer and later rented a room from a woman, Mrs. Charles Brown. He attended a Baptist church.

Bethea's criminal record began in 1935, when he was charged with breach of the peace and fined $20. In April of the same year, he was caught stealing two purses from the Vogue Beauty Shop. Since the value of the purses exceeded $25, Bethea was convicted of a felony, grand larceny, and consequently sentenced to one year in the Kentucky State Penitentiary at Eddyville. He arrived there on June 1, 1935, and his prison physical exam information describes him as 5 ft. 4 3/8 inches (1.635 m) tall and weighing 128 pounds (58 kg). He gained parole half a year later on December 1, 1935.

On release, he returned to Owensboro and continued to work as a laborer, earning about seven dollars per week. Less than a month later, he was arrested for house breaking. On January 6, 1936, the court amended this charge to being drunk and disorderly in public and imposed a $100 fine (equivalent to $2320 in 2025). Because he could not afford to pay, he remained incarcerated in the Daviess County Jail until April 18, 1936.

=== Crime and arrest ===
During the early morning of June 7, 1936, Bethea entered the home of Lishia Rarick Edwards on East Fifth Street by climbing onto the roof of an outbuilding next door. From there, he jumped onto the roof of the servant's quarters of Emmett Wells' house, and then walked down a wooden walkway. He climbed over the kitchen roof to Edwards' bedroom window.

After removing a screen from her window, he entered the room, waking her. Bethea then choked Edwards and violently raped her. After she was unconscious, he searched for valuables and stole several of her rings. In the process, he removed his own black celluloid prison ring, and failed to later retrieve it. He left the bedroom and hid the stolen jewels in a barn not far from the house.

The crime was discovered late that morning after the Smith family, who lived downstairs, noticed they had not heard Edwards stirring in her room. They feared she might have been ill and knocked on the door of her room, attempting to rouse her. They found the door locked with a key still inside the lock from the inside, which prevented another key from being placed in the lock from the outside. They contacted a neighbor, Robert Richardson, hoping he could help, and he managed to knock the key free, but another skeleton key would not unlock the door. Smith then got a ladder. He climbed into the room through the transom over the door and discovered that Edwards was dead.

The Smiths alerted Dr. George Barr while he was attending a service at the local Methodist Church. Dr. Barr realized there was not much he could do and summoned the local coroner, Delbert Glenn, who attended the same church. The Smiths also called the Owensboro police. Officers found the room was otherwise tidy, but there were muddy footprints everywhere. Coroner Glenn also found Bethea's celluloid prison ring. By late Sunday afternoon, the police already suspected Rainey Bethea after several residents of Owensboro stated that they had previously seen Bethea wearing the ring. Since Bethea had a criminal record, the police could use the then-new identification technique of fingerprints to establish that Bethea had recently touched items inside the bedroom. Police searched for Bethea over the next four days.

On the Wednesday following the discovery of the murder, Burt "Red" Figgins was working on the bank of the Ohio River, when he observed Bethea lying under some bushes. Figgins asked Bethea what he was doing, and Bethea responded he was "cooling off." Figgins then reported this sighting to his supervisor, Will Faith, and asked him to call the police. By the time Faith had returned to the spot on the river bank, Bethea had moved to the nearby Koll's Grocery. Faith followed him and then found a policeman in the drugstore, but when they searched for Bethea, he again eluded capture.

Later that afternoon, Bethea was again spotted. This time, he was cornered on the river bank after he tried to board a barge. When police officers questioned him, he denied that he was Bethea, claiming his name was James Smith. The police played along with the fabricated name, fearing a mob would develop if residents were to learn that they had captured Bethea. After his arrest, Bethea was identified by a scar on the left side of his head.

=== Trial ===
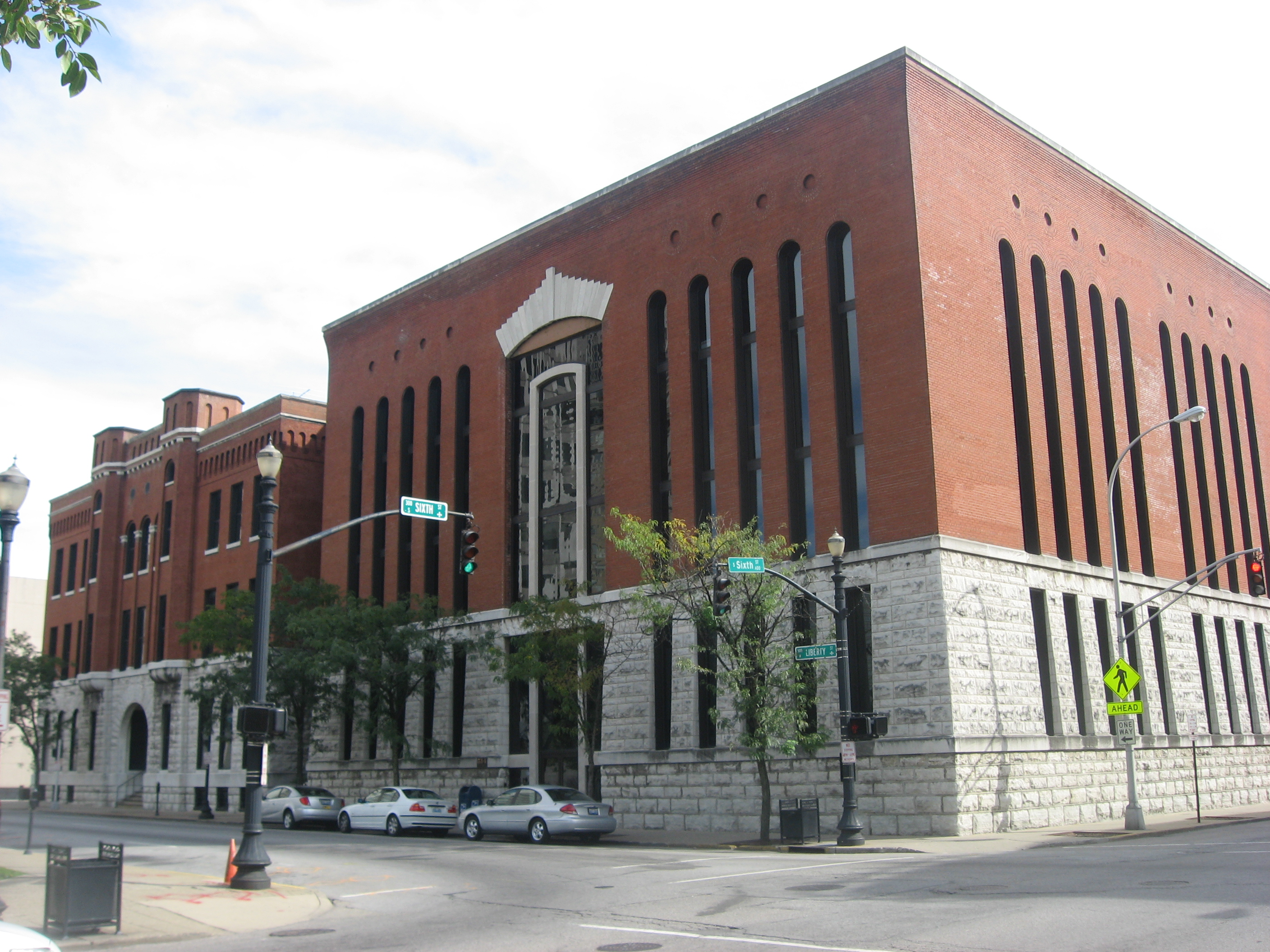
Jefferson County Jail

Judge Forrest A. Roby of the Daviess Circuit Court ordered the sheriff to transport Bethea to the Jefferson County Jail in Louisville. While being transferred, Bethea made his first confession, admitting that he had raped Edwards and strangled her to death. Bethea also lamented the fact that he had made a mistake by leaving his ring at the crime scene, stating that he had removed the ring in order to try on Edwards's rings.

On June 12, 1936, Bethea confessed a second time, telling the guards where he had hidden the stolen jewelry. Owensboro police searched a barn in Owensboro and found the jewelry where Bethea said he had left it. Under Kentucky law, the grand jury could not convene until June 22, and the prosecutor charged Bethea solely with rape. Under extant state statutes, executions for murder and robbery were carried out by electrocution at the state penitentiary in Eddyville. Rape, however, could be punished by public hanging in the county seat where the crime occurred. Bethea was never charged with the remaining crimes of theft, robbery, burglary, giving a false name to police, or murder. After one hour and 40 minutes, the grand jury returned an indictment, charging Bethea with rape.

On June 25, 1936, officers returned Bethea to Owensboro for the trial, which took place that same day. Bethea asserted a Clyde Maddox would provide an alibi, but Maddox claimed he did not know Bethea. The defense subpoenaed four witnesses: Maddox, Ladd Moorman, Willie Johnson (a supposed accomplice given Bethea's statements), and Allen McDaniel. The first three were served; however, the sheriff's office could not find a person named Allen McDaniel.

On the night before the trial, Bethea announced to his lawyers that he wanted to plead guilty, doing so the next day at the start of the trial. The prosecutor still presented the state's case to the jury in spite of the guilty plea, requesting a death penalty for Bethea. In his opening statement, Commonwealth's Attorney Herman Birkhead said, "This is one of the most dastardly, beastly, cowardly crimes ever committed in Daviess County. Justice demands and the Commonwealth will ask and expect a verdict of the death penalty by hanging."

After questioning 21 witnesses, the prosecution closed its case. The defense did not present or examine any witnesses. After a closing statement by the prosecutor, the judge instructed the jury that since Bethea had pleaded guilty, they must "...fix his punishment, at confinement in the penitentiary for not less than ten years nor more than twenty years, or at death." After only four and a half minutes of deliberation, the jury returned with a sentence of death by hanging. Bethea was then quickly removed from the courthouse and returned to the Jefferson County Jail. In all, Bethea's trial lasted for three hours.

=== Appeal and petition for habeas corpus ===
Back in Louisville, Bethea acquired five new African-American lawyers to try to save his life: Charles Ewbank Tucker, Stephen A. Burnley, Charles W. Anderson Jr., Harry E. Bonaparte, and R. Everett Ray. They worked pro bono to challenge the sentence, which they saw as their ethical duty for the indigent defendant who could not pay standard legal fees. On July 10, 1936, they filed a motion for a new trial. The judge summarily denied this on the grounds that under Section 273 of the Kentucky Code of Practice in Criminal Cases, a motion for a new trial had to have been received before the end of the court's term, which had ended on July 4.

Bethea's team then tried to appeal to the Kentucky Court of Appeals, which was also not in session at that time. On July 29, Justice Gus Thomas returned to Frankfort where he heard the oral motion. Justice Thomas refused to let them file the appeal, on the grounds that the trial court record was incomplete since it only included the judge's ruling. While the lawyers knew that the Kentucky courts would deny the appeal, they filed it anyway as a formality in order to exhaust the state court remedies available to them before they filed a petition for writ of habeas corpus in a federal court. Once Thomas denied the motion to file a belated appeal, Bethea's attorneys filed a petition for writ of habeas corpus in the U.S. District Court for the Western District of Kentucky at Louisville.

On August 5, a hearing was held at the Federal Building in Louisville before United States District Judge Elwood Hamilton. During the hearing, Bethea claimed that he had pled guilty unwillingly and had wanted to subpoena three witnesses to testify on his behalf, but his initial lawyers had forced him to plead guilty and did not have the desired witnesses testify. He also claimed that his five confessions had been made under duress and that he had signed one confession unaware of what he was signing. The Commonwealth brought several witnesses to refute these claims. Ultimately, Judge Hamilton denied the habeas corpus petition and ruled that the hanging could proceed.

=== Execution ===
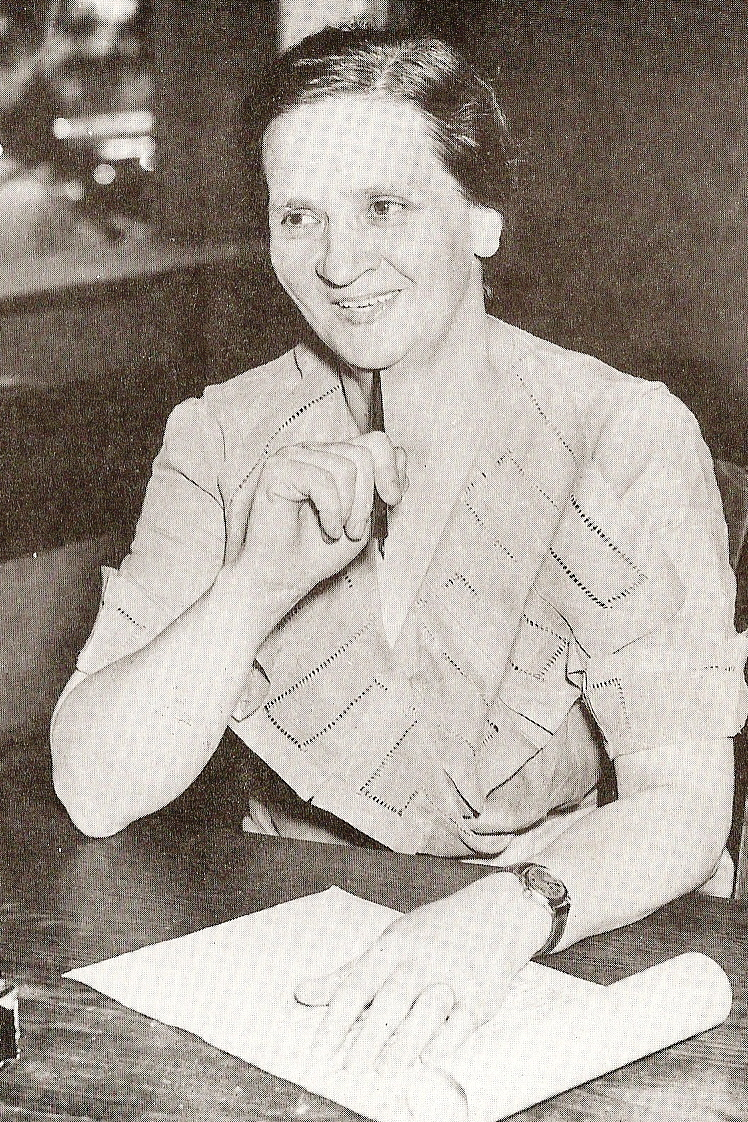
Sheriff Florence Thompson

While the crime was infamous locally, it came to nationwide attention because the sheriff of Daviess County was a woman. Florence Shoemaker Thompson had become sheriff on April 13, 1936, after her husband Everett Thompson unexpectedly died of pneumonia on April 10. Florence Thompson became sheriff through widow's succession, and as sheriff of the county, she was tasked with hanging Bethea.

Arthur L. Hash, a former Louisville police officer, offered his services free of charge to perform the execution. Thompson accepted this offer. He asked that she not make his name public. Hash arrived at the site intoxicated wearing a white suit and a white Panama hat. At this time, no one but he and Thompson knew that he would pull the trigger.

On August 6, the Governor of Kentucky, Albert Chandler, signed Bethea's execution warrant and set the execution for sunrise on August 14. Thompson requested the governor to issue a revised death warrant because the original warrant specified that the hanging would take place in the courthouse yard where the county had recently planted, at significant cost, new shrubs and flowers. Chandler was out of state, so Lieutenant Governor of Kentucky Keen Johnson, as acting governor, signed a second death warrant moving the location of the hanging from the courthouse yard to an empty lot near the county garage.

Rainey Bethea's last meal consisted of fried chicken, pork chops, mashed potatoes, pickled cucumbers, cornbread, lemon pie, and ice cream, which he ate at 4:00 p.m. on August 13 in Louisville. At about 1:00 a.m., Daviess County deputy sheriffs transported Bethea from Louisville to Owensboro. At the Daviess County Jail, professional hangman Phil Hanna of Epworth, Illinois, visited Bethea and instructed him to stand on the X that would be marked on the trapdoor.

Bethea left the Daviess County Jail at 5:21 a.m. and walked with two deputies to the scaffold. Within two minutes, he was at the base of the scaffold. Removing his shoes, he put on a new pair of socks. He ascended the steps and stood on the large X as instructed. After Bethea made his final confession to Fr Herman J. Lammers of the Cathedral of the Assumption in Louisville, who had also supervised Bethea's conversion to Catholicism during Bethea's incarceration at the Jefferson County Jail two weeks prior to the execution, officers placed a black hood over his head and fastened three large straps around his ankles, thighs, arms, and chest.

Hanna placed the noose around Bethea's neck, adjusted it, and then signaled to Hash to pull the trigger. Instead, Hash, who was drunk, did nothing. Hanna shouted at Hash, "Do it!" A deputy then leaned onto the trigger, which sprang the trap door. Bethea fell 8 feet (2.4 m), and his neck was instantly broken. Afterward, two doctors confirmed he was dead. He wanted his body to be sent to his sister in South Carolina so that she could arrange for him to be interred next to his father, but against these wishes, he was buried in a pauper's grave at Owensboro Cemetery (also known as City Cemetery and "Potter's Field") in Owensboro.

It was estimated that a crowd of about 20,000 people gathered to watch the execution. One man, 36-year-old Leonard A. Peters, was killed in a car accident while driving to Owensboro to witness the hanging. Three others, including his wife, were injured. Afterwards, Hanna complained that Hash should not have been allowed to perform the execution in his drunken condition. Hanna further said it was the worst display he experienced in the 70 hangings he had supervised.

== End of public executions in Kentucky ==
As the Kentucky General Assembly had been meeting in its biennial sessions at the time, the media circus surrounding the Bethea execution embarrassed members of the Kentucky legislature. In spite of the humiliation, they could not amend laws regarding executions until the next session in 1938. However, the trial judges in two separate Kentucky rape cases ordered that the hangings of John "Pete" Montjoy and Harold Van Venison be conducted privately. Montjoy, age 23, was privately hanged in Covington on December 17, 1937.

On January 17, 1938, William R. Attkisson of the Kentucky State Senate's 38th District (representing Louisville), introduced Senate Bill 69, repealing the requirement in Section 1137 that executions for convicted rapists be conducted by hanging in the county seat where they raped their victims. The bill was promoted in the Kentucky House of Representatives by Representative Charles W. Anderson Jr., one of the attorneys who assisted Bethea in his post-conviction relief motions.

After both houses approved the bill, Governor Chandler signed it into law on March 12, 1938; it became effective on May 30 of that year. Chandler later expressed regret at having approved the repeal, claiming, "Our streets are no longer safe." The last person ever legally hanged in Kentucky was Harold Van Venison, a 33-year-old African-American singer, who was privately executed in Covington on June 3, 1938.

== See also ==
- Capital punishment in Kentucky
- List of people executed in Kentucky (pre-1972)
- List of people executed in the United States in 1936
