= Prison ring =

Plastic jewelry made by prisoners

A prison ring is a type of plastic jewelry fashioned by hand in prisons. Due to the scarcity or lack of access to traditional jewellery making tools and materials (metals and jewels) in prisons; prisoners were able to utilize other readily available plastic materials, commonly celluloid; prisoners improvised by working scrap plastic material, salvaged from combs, pens, toothbrushes, eyeglasses and other items. Celluloid was historically a popular material since it could be heat bonded and glues were often less available. A common feature of prison rings were small photos mounted on the bezel.

The rings were produced as early as the 1920s. Rainey Bethea, the last person to be publicly executed in the United States, was caught after a 1936 rape and murder because he left a distinctive prison ring at the murder scene.
