= Florence Shoemaker Thompson =

American sheriff and executioner (1892–1961)

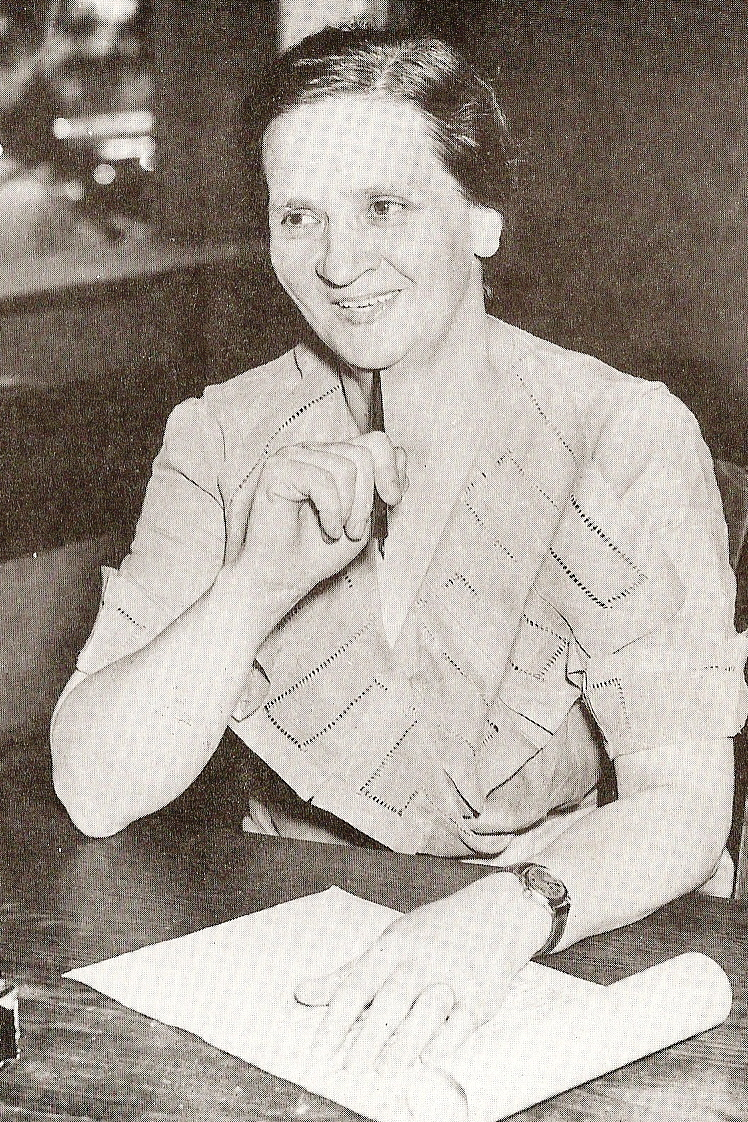
- Sheriff Florence Thompson
- Born: October 30, 1892; Louisville, Kentucky, US
- Died: April 13, 1961 (aged 68); Owensboro, Kentucky, US
- Occupation: Sheriff
- Spouse: Joseph Everett Thompson (m. 1915; died 1936)
- Children: 4, including James

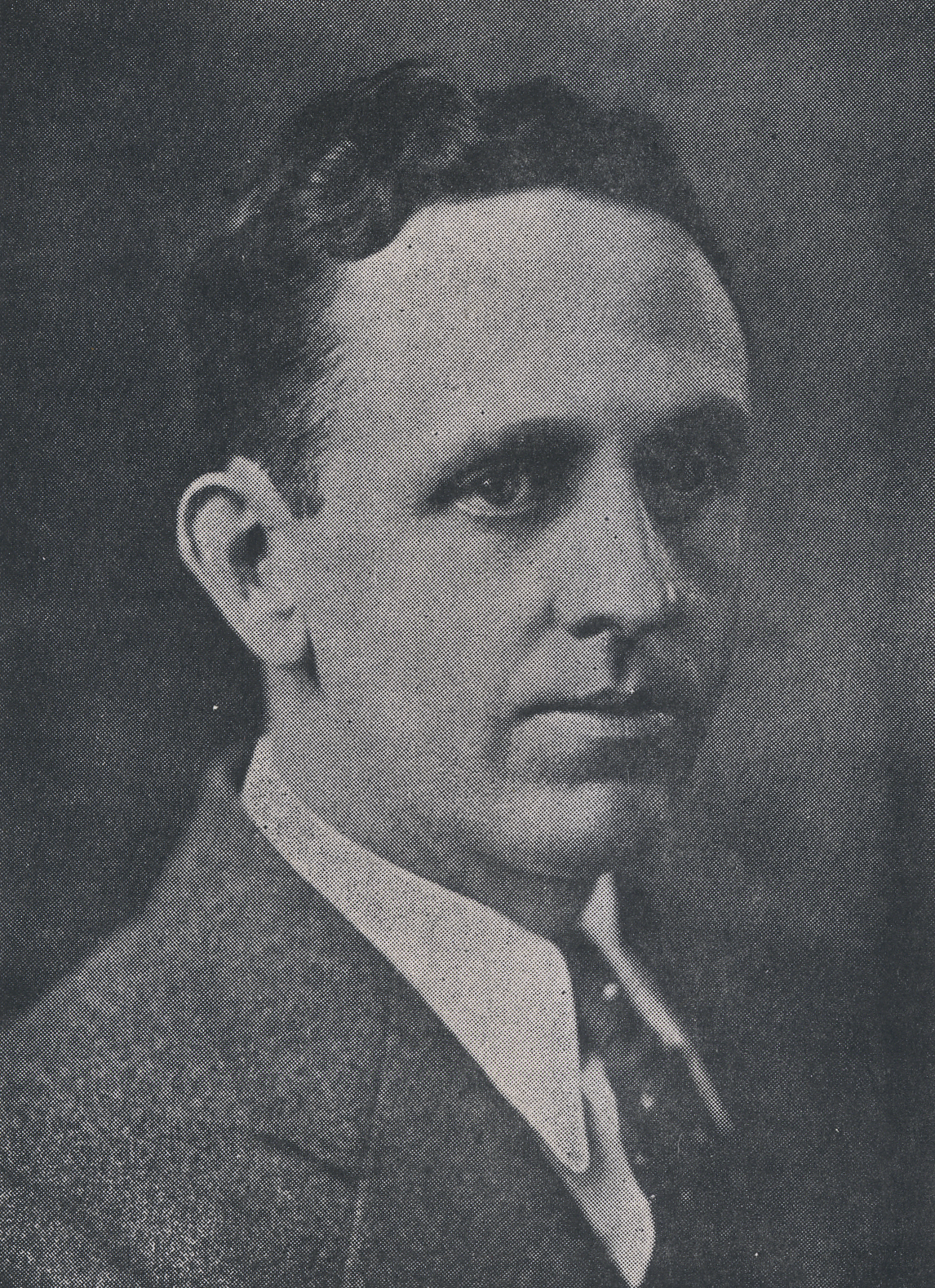
Everett Thompson (1893–1936)

Florence Katherine Shoemaker Thompson Riney (October 30, 1892 – April 13, 1961) was the first female sheriff in the United States to carry out an execution. She oversaw the execution of Rainey Bethea, the last man to be publicly executed in Kentucky, who was convicted of rape and sentenced to death by hanging in Daviess County, Kentucky.

== Early life ==
Florence Shoemaker was born to Andrew Jefferson and Henrietta Fronie Shoemaker in Louisville, Kentucky. She married Joseph Everett Thompson on January 12, 1915, and had four children. Everett was sworn in as the sheriff of Daviess County on January 1, 1934. On April 10, 1936, Everett Thompson died of suspected pneumonia at the age of 42. After her husband died, Florence had no way to provide for her family. By law, the county judge needed to appoint a sheriff to finish Everett's position until someone else could be elected. The judge asked Florence to fill the vacancy (customarily known as widow's succession) and she accepted as a way to support her family.

== Time as sheriff ==
Florence Thompson was sworn in on the day after her husband's funeral. Throughout her time as sheriff she rarely wore a uniform, but would sometimes wear a badge on her dress. She generally did not perform arrests but would do so when no one else was available. In her first few years as sheriff she was diagnosed with Parkinson's disease.

=== Public execution of Rainey Bethea ===
On July 25, 1936, just over two months into Thompson's term, Rainey Bethea was sentenced to death by hanging for raping Lischia Edwards. Because of the way the law was written, Bethea had to be returned to Daviess County to have the execution carried out and because Thompson was the sheriff at the time, it was her duty to carry out the execution. She was quite conflicted with the ruling and its impact on her role as sheriff and as a woman. She wanted to carry out her duties, but being a devout Christian was concerned about her standing with the church should she follow through with the hanging. Her friend and confidant, Father Albert J. Thompson, priest at an Owensboro church, assured her she could perform all of her duties, including the execution and remain in good standing with the church.

As news of the hanging got around, she was bombarded with reporters. They expected her to effect the actual execution, which would make her the first American woman to kill a man by court order. The journalists nicknamed Thompson as "The Hangwoman". She received many letters, some encouraging her to do the execution herself while others expressed distress at the thought of her carrying out the task. The secretary of the Louisville National Association for the Advancement of Colored People, Bessie Etherly, wrote to the current Governor, Happy Chandler, concerned about the way the execution would take place. Governor Chandler wrote to Thompson requesting that she not make it a spectacle. He also included Etherly's letter with his. Thompson also received letters from people offering to carry out the execution for her. Thompson decided not to perform the execution herself. Thompson had asked each of her deputies if they would carry out the execution before offering the job to Arthur L. Hash, a former Louisville police officer and World War I veteran.

Thompson had forbidden all of her children from attending and had made arrangements for her children to stay at her friend Elmer Dyer's home. Death threats had been made toward Thompson's children. An FBI agent drove Thompson to the scaffold the morning of the execution, and she stayed in the car about 50 yards (46 m) away then drove away soon after Bethea was executed. Hash was so intoxicated that when given the sign to pull the lever, he did not do it and ultimately, one of Thompson's deputies had to lean on the lever to open the trap door. A reporter for The New York Times wrote: "Ten thousand white persons, some jeering and others festive, saw a prayerful black man put to death today on Daviess County's 'pit and gallows'." The Chicago Sun reported that Thompson fainted at the base of the scaffold, forcing Hash to perform the task. Some reported that the crowd was rowdy and unruly while others reported that the crowd jumped on the body and began ripping off the hood.

Because of these reports and the nature of the hanging, Thompson received multiple marriage proposals and death threats. One threat said that they already had Hash and that they were coming for her and her children next.

=== Landslide election victory ===
Thompson's appointment by the county judge did not run the entire length of her deceased husband's term, and an election was required to determine who would be sheriff for the remaining term. Thompson subsequently ran and was elected by a landslide. Thompson received 9,811 votes. Simon B. Smith, a competitor, received two votes and Tom Gall, another competitor, received one vote. On November 3, 1936, Thompson was elected to carry out the remainder of her husband's term. Thompson did not run for sheriff after her elected term, and Simon B. Smith was sworn on January 3, 1938.

== Later life ==
Thompson was appointed a deputy sheriff by Simon B. Smith and was in the position for nine years. In December 1944, Thompson married J. Carl Riney after his wife, one of Thompson's friends, had died nine years prior. Her Parkinson's continued to progress. In July 1959 Thompson was admitted to Our Lady of Mercy Hospital in Owensboro, Kentucky. On April 13, 1961, she died there at the age of 68. Her funeral was held at St. Stephen's Catholic Cathedral by Reverend Anthony Higdon. She was buried beside her first husband, Everett, in the Mater Dolorosa Catholic Cemetery in Owensboro.

== See also ==
- Rainey Bethea
- Hanging in the United States
- Pearl Carter Pace
