= List of acts of the 116th United States Congress =

The 116th United States Congress, which began on January 3, 2019, and ended on January 3, 2021, enacted 344 public laws and zero private laws.

== Public laws ==
The 116th Congress enacted the following laws:

Public law number (Linked to Wikisource)	Date of enactment	Official short title(s)	Official title	Link to GPO
116-1	January 16, 2019	Government Employee Fair Treatment Act of 2019	A bill to provide for the compensation of Federal and other government employees affected by lapses in appropriations.	Pub. L. 116–1 (text) (PDF)
116-2	January 18, 2019	Chemical Facility Anti-Terrorism Standards Program Extension Act	To extend by 15 months the Chemical Facility Anti-Terrorism Standards Program of the Department of Homeland Security, and for other purposes.	Pub. L. 116–2 (text) (PDF)
116-3	January 24, 2019	Medicaid Extenders Act of 2019	To extend the Medicaid Money Follows the Person Rebalancing demonstration, to extend protection for Medicaid recipients of home and community-based services against spousal impoverishment, and for other purposes.	Pub. L. 116–3 (text) (PDF)
116-4	January 24, 2019	TANF Extension Act of 2019	To extend the program of block grants to States for temporary assistance for needy families and related programs through June 30, 2019.	Pub. L. 116–4 (text) (PDF)
116-5	January 25, 2019	Further Additional Continuing Appropriations Act, 2019	Making further continuing appropriations for fiscal year 2019, and for other purposes.	Pub. L. 116–5 (text) (PDF)
116-6	February 15, 2019	Consolidated Appropriations Act, 2019	Making consolidated appropriations for the fiscal year ending September 30, 2019 and for other purposes.	Pub. L. 116–6 (text) (PDF)
116-7	February 21, 2019	National FFA Organization's Federal Charter Amendments Act	To amend the charter of the Future Farmers of America, and for other purposes.	Pub. L. 116–7 (text) (PDF)
116-8	March 8, 2019	Pesticide Registration Improvement Extension Act of 2018	A bill to enact into law a bill by reference.	Pub. L. 116–8 (text) (PDF)
116-9	March 12, 2019	John D. Dingell Jr. Conservation, Management, and Recreation Act	To provide for the management of the natural resources of the United States, and for other purposes.	Pub. L. 116–9 (text) (PDF)
116-10	March 21, 2019	(No short title)	A bill to designate the outstation of the Department of Veterans Affairs in North Ogden, Utah, as the "Major Brent Taylor Vet Center Outstation".	Pub. L. 116–10 (text) (PDF)
116-11	April 6, 2019	(No short title)	A bill to authorize the honorary appointment of Robert J. Dole to the grade of colonel in the regular Army.	Pub. L. 116–11 (text) (PDF)
116-12	April 8, 2019	(No short title)	A bill to amend title 38, United States Code, to clarify the grade and pay of podiatrists of the Department of Veterans Affairs.	Pub. L. 116–12 (text) (PDF)
116-13	April 12, 2019	Recognizing Achievement in Classified School Employees Act	To direct the Secretary of Education to establish the Recognizing Inspiring School Employees (RISE) Award Program recognizing excellence exhibited by classified school employees providing services to students in prekindergarten through high school.	Pub. L. 116–13 (text) (PDF)
116-14	April 16, 2019	Colorado River Drought Contingency Plan Authorization Act	To direct the Secretary of the Interior to execute and carry out agreements concerning Colorado River Drought Contingency Management and Operations, and for other purposes.	Pub. L. 116–14 (text) (PDF)
116-15	April 16, 2019	(No short title)	A bill to change the address of the postal facility designated in honor of Captain Humayun Khan.	Pub. L. 116–15 (text) (PDF)
116-16	April 18, 2019	Medicaid Services Investment and Accountability Act of 2019	To amend title XIX to extend protection for Medicaid recipients of home and community-based services against spousal impoverishment, establish a State Medicaid option to provide coordinated care to children with complex medical conditions through health homes, prevent the misclassification of drugs for purposes of the Medicaid drug rebate program, and for other purposes.	Pub. L. 116–16 (text) (PDF)
116-17	May 10, 2019	Target Practice and Marksmanship Training Support Act	To amend the Pittman–Robertson Wildlife Restoration Act to facilitate the establishment of additional or expanded public target ranges in certain States.	Pub. L. 116–17 (text) (PDF)
116-18	May 23, 2019	(No short title)	To reauthorize the Bulletproof Vest Partnership Grant Program.	Pub. L. 116–18 (text) (PDF)
116-19	May 31, 2019	National Flood Insurance Extension Act of 2019	A bill to reauthorize the National Flood Insurance Program.	Pub. L. 116–19 (text) (PDF)
116-20	June 6, 2019	Additional Supplemental Appropriations for Disaster Relief Act, 2019	Making supplemental appropriations for the fiscal year ending September 30, 2019, and for other purposes.	Pub. L. 116–20 (text) (PDF)
116-21	June 12, 2019	(No short title)	A bill to make technical corrections to the computation of average pay under Public Law 110-279.	Pub. L. 116–21 (text) (PDF)
116-22	June 24, 2019	Pandemic and All-Hazards Preparedness and Advancing Innovation Act of 2019	A bill to reauthorize certain programs under the Public Health Service Act and the Federal Food, Drug, and Cosmetic Act with respect to public health security and all-hazards preparedness and response, and for other purposes.	Pub. L. 116–22 (text) (PDF)
116-23	June 25, 2019	Blue Water Navy Vietnam Veterans Act of 2019	To amend title 38, United States Code, to clarify presumptions relating to the exposure of certain veterans who served in the vicinity of the Republic of Vietnam, and for other purposes.	Pub. L. 116–23 (text) (PDF)
116-24	June 25, 2019	Northern Mariana Islands Long-Term Legal Residents Relief Act	To amend section 6 of the Joint Resolution entitled "A Joint Resolution to approve the Covenant To Establish a Commonwealth of the Northern Mariana Islands in Political Union with the United States of America, and for other purposes".	Pub. L. 116–24 (text) (PDF)
116-25	July 1, 2019	Taxpayer First Act	To amend the Internal Revenue Code of 1986 to modernize and improve the Internal Revenue Service, and for other purposes.	Pub. L. 116–25 (text) (PDF)
116-26	July 1, 2019	Emergency Supplemental Appropriations for Humanitarian Assistance and Security at the Southern Border Act, 2019	Making emergency supplemental appropriations for the fiscal year ending September 30, 2019, and for other purposes.	Pub. L. 116–26 (text) (PDF)
116-27	July 5, 2019	(No short title)	To extend the program of block grants to States for temporary assistance for needy families and related programs through September 30, 2019.	Pub. L. 116–27 (text) (PDF)
116-28	July 5, 2019	(No short title)	Requesting the Secretary of the Interior to authorize unique and one-time arrangements for displays on the National Mall and the Washington Monument during the period beginning on July 16, 2019, and ending on July 20, 2019.	Pub. L. 116–28 (text) (PDF)
116-29	July 5, 2019	(No short title)	A bill to provide for a 2-week extension of the Medicaid community mental health services demonstration program, and for other purposes.	Pub. L. 116–29 (text) (PDF)
116-30	July 25, 2019	Fairness for Breastfeeding Mothers Act of 2019	To provide a lactation room in public buildings.	Pub. L. 116–30 (text) (PDF)
116-31	July 25, 2019	Effective Prosecution of Possession of Biological Toxins and Agents Act of 2019	A bill to amend section 175b of title 18, United States Code, to correct a scrivener's error.	Pub. L. 116–31 (text) (PDF)
116-32	July 25, 2019	Supporting and Treating Officers in Crisis Act of 2019	A bill to amend the Omnibus Crime Control and Safe Streets Act of 1968 to expand support for police officer family services, stress reduction, and suicide prevention, and for other purposes.	Pub. L. 116–32 (text) (PDF)
116-33	July 25, 2019	Protecting Affordable Mortgages for Veterans Act of 2019	A bill to clarify seasoning requirements for certain refinanced mortgage loans, and for other purposes.	Pub. L. 116–33 (text) (PDF)
116-34	July 29, 2019	Never Forget the Heroes: James Zadroga, Ray Pfeifer, and Luis Alvarez Permanent Authorization of the September 11th Victim Compensation Fund Act	To extend authorization for the September 11th Victim Compensation Fund of 2001 through fiscal year 2092, and for other purposes.	Pub. L. 116–34 (text) (PDF)
116-35	July 30, 2019	Let Everyone Get Involved in Opportunities for National Service Act (LEGION Act)	A bill to amend title 36, United States Code, to authorize The American Legion to determine the requirements for membership in The American Legion, and for other purposes.	Pub. L. 116–35 (text) (PDF)
116-36	July 31, 2019	(No short title)	To amend title 38, United States Code, to reduce the credit hour requirement for the Edith Nourse Rogers STEM Scholarship program of the Department of Veterans Affairs.	Pub. L. 116–36 (text) (PDF)
116-37	August 2, 2019	Bipartisan Budget Act of 2019	To amend the Balanced Budget and Emergency Deficit Control Act of 1985, to establish a congressional budget for fiscal years 2020 and 2021, to temporarily suspend the debt limit, and for other purposes.	Pub. L. 116–37 (text) (PDF)
116-38	August 2, 2019	(No short title)	A bill to allow the Deputy Administrator of the Federal Aviation Administration on the date of enactment of this Act to continue to serve as such Deputy Administrator.	Pub. L. 116–38 (text) (PDF)
116-39	August 6, 2019	Sustaining Excellence in Medicaid Act of 2019	To provide for certain extensions with respect to the Medicaid program under title XIX of the Social Security Act, and for other purposes.	Pub. L. 116–39 (text) (PDF)
116-40	August 9, 2019	(No short title)	To amend title 28, United States Code, to add Flagstaff and Yuma to the list of locations in which court shall be held in the judicial district for the State of Arizona.	Pub. L. 116–40 (text) (PDF)
116-41	August 9, 2019	(No short title)	To rename the Success Dam in Tulare County, California, as the "Richard L. Schafer Dam".	Pub. L. 116–41 (text) (PDF)
116-42	August 21, 2019	(No short title)	To designate the facility of the United States Postal Service located at 770 Ayrault Road in Fairport, New York, as the "Louise and Bob Slaughter Post Office".	Pub. L. 116–42 (text) (PDF)
116-43	August 21, 2019	(No short title)	To designate the facility of the United States Postal Service located at 25 Route 111 in Smithtown, New York, as the "Congressman Bill Carney Post Office".	Pub. L. 116–43 (text) (PDF)
116-44	August 21, 2019	(No short title)	To designate the facility of the United States Postal Service located at 1450 Montauk Highway in Mastic, New York, as the "Army Specialist Thomas J. Wilwerth Post Office Building".	Pub. L. 116–44 (text) (PDF)
116-45	August 21, 2019	(No short title)	To designate the facility of the United States Postal Service located at 404 South Boulder Highway in Henderson, Nevada, as the "Henderson Veterans Memorial Post Office Building".	Pub. L. 116–45 (text) (PDF)
116-46	August 21, 2019	(No short title)	To designate the facility of the United States Postal Service located at 3033 203rd Street in Olympia Fields, Illinois, as the "Captain Robert L. Martin Post Office".	Pub. L. 116–46 (text) (PDF)
116-47	August 21, 2019	(No short title)	To designate the facility of the United States Postal Service located at 2509 George Mason Drive in Virginia Beach, Virginia, as the "Ryan Keith Cox Post Office Building".	Pub. L. 116–47 (text) (PDF)
116-48	August 22, 2019	(No short title)	To amend section 327 of the Robert T. Stafford Disaster Relief and Emergency Assistance Act to clarify that National Urban Search and Rescue Response System task forces may include Federal employees.	Pub. L. 116–48 (text) (PDF)
116-49	August 22, 2019	Emergency Medical Services for Children Program Reauthorization Act of 2019	To amend the Public Health Service Act to reauthorize the Emergency Medical Services for Children program.	Pub. L. 116–49 (text) (PDF)
116-50	August 22, 2019	Creating Advanced Streamlined Electronic Services for Constituents Act of 2019 (or CASES Act)	To require the Director of the Office of Management and Budget to issue guidance on electronic consent forms, and for other purposes.	Pub. L. 116–50 (text) (PDF)
116-51	August 23, 2019	Family Farmer Relief Act of 2019	To amend title 11, United States Code, with respect to the definition of "family farmer".	Pub. L. 116–51 (text) (PDF)
116-52	August 23, 2019	Honoring American Veterans in Extreme Need Act of 2019 (or HAVEN Act)	To exempt from the calculation of monthly income certain benefits paid by the Department of Veterans Affairs and the Department of Defense.	Pub. L. 116–52 (text) (PDF)
116-53	August 23, 2019	National Guard and Reservists Debt Relief Extension Act of 2019	To exempt for an additional 4-year period, from the application of the means-test presumption of abuse under chapter 7, qualifying members of reserve components of the Armed Forces and members of the National Guard who, after September 11, 2001, are called to active duty or to perform a homeland defense activity for not less than 90 days.	Pub. L. 116–53 (text) (PDF)
116-54	August 23, 2019	Small Business Reorganization Act of 2019	To amend chapter 11 of title 11, United States Code, to address reorganization of small businesses, and for other purposes.	Pub. L. 116–54 (text) (PDF)
116-55	August 23, 2019	(No short title)	To designate the facility of the United States Postal Service located at 11158 Highway 146 North in Hardin, Texas, as the "Lucas Lowe Memorial Post Office".	Pub. L. 116–55 (text) (PDF)
116-56	August 23, 2019	Restore the Harmony Way Bridge Act	To transfer a bridge over the Wabash River to the New Harmony River Bridge Authority and the New Harmony and Wabash River Bridge Authority, and for other purposes.	Pub. L. 116–56 (text) (PDF)
116-57	September 22, 2019	Reviving America's Scenic Byways Act of 2019	To direct the Secretary of Transportation to request nominations for and make determinations regarding roads to be designated under the national scenic byways program, and for other purposes.	Pub. L. 116–57 (text) (PDF)
116-58	September 26, 2019	Veterans' Compensation Cost-of-Living Adjustment Act of 2019	To increase, effective as of December 1, 2019, the rates of compensation for veterans with service-connected disabilities and the rates of dependency and indemnity compensation for the survivors of certain disabled veterans, and for other purposes.	Pub. L. 116–58 (text) (PDF)
116-59	September 27, 2019	Continuing Appropriations Act, 2020, and Health Extenders Act of 2019	Making continuing appropriations for fiscal year 2020, and for other purposes.	Pub. L. 116–59 (text) (PDF)
116-60	September 30, 2019	Autism Collaboration, Accountability, Research, Education, and Support Act of 2019	To amend the Public Health Service Act to enhance activities of the National Institutes of Health with respect to research on autism spectrum disorder and enhance programs relating to autism, and for other purposes.	Pub. L. 116–60 (text) (PDF)
116-61	September 30, 2019	Department of Veterans Affairs Expiring Authorities Act of 2019	To amend title 38, United States Code, to extend and modify certain authorities and requirements relating to the Department of Veterans Affairs, and for other purposes.	Pub. L. 116–61 (text) (PDF)
116-62	October 4, 2019	Alaska Remote Generator Reliability and Protection Act	A bill to prevent catastrophic failure or shutdown of remote diesel power engines due to emission control devices, and for other purposes.	Pub. L. 116–62 (text) (PDF)
116-63	October 4, 2019	(No short title)	A bill to permit States to transfer certain funds from the clean water revolving fund of a State to the drinking water revolving fund of the State in certain circumstances, and for other purposes.	Pub. L. 116–63 (text) (PDF)
116-64	October 9, 2019	Terrorist and Foreign Fighter Travel Exercise Act of 2019	To require an exercise related to terrorist and foreign fighter travel, and for other purposes.	Pub. L. 116–64 (text) (PDF)
116-65	October 9, 2019	Christa McAuliffe Commemorative Coin Act of 2019	To require the Secretary of the Treasury to mint coins in recognition of Christa McAuliffe.	Pub. L. 116–65 (text) (PDF)
116-66	October 31, 2019	(No short title)	To designate the facility of the United States Postal Service located at 1715 Linnerud Drive in Sun Prairie, Wisconsin, as the "Fire Captain Cory Barr Post Office Building".	Pub. L. 116–66 (text) (PDF)
116-67	November 7, 2019	National POW/MIA Flag Act	To amend title 36, United States Code, to require that the POW/MIA flag be displayed on all days that the flag of the United States is displayed on certain Federal property.	Pub. L. 116–67 (text) (PDF)
116-68	November 8, 2019	Hidden Figures Congressional Gold Medal Act	To award Congressional Gold Medals to Katherine Johnson and Dr. Christine Darden, to posthumously award Congressional Gold Medals to Dorothy Vaughan and Mary Jackson, and to award a Congressional Gold Medal to honor all of the women who contributed to the success of the National Aeronautics and Space Administration during the Space Race.	Pub. L. 116–68 (text) (PDF)
116-69	November 21, 2019	Further Continuing Appropriations Act, 2020, and Further Health Extenders Act of 2019	Making further continuing appropriations for fiscal year 2020, and for other purposes.	Pub. L. 116–69 (text) (PDF)
116-70	November 22, 2019	Rebuilding Small Businesses After Disasters Act	To extend the sunset for collateral requirements for Small Business Administration disaster loans.	Pub. L. 116–70 (text) (PDF)
116-71	November 25, 2019	Women's Suffrage Centennial Commemorative Coin Act	An act to require the Secretary of the Treasury to mint coins in commemoration of ratification of the 19th Amendment to the Constitution of the United States, giving women in the United States the right to vote.	Pub. L. 116–71 (text) (PDF)
116-72	November 25, 2019	Preventing Animal Cruelty and Torture Act	To revise section 48 of title 18, United States Code, and for other purposes.	Pub. L. 116–72 (text) (PDF)
116-73	November 26, 2019	Divisional Realignment for the Eastern District of Arkansas Act of 2019	To amend title 28, United States Code, to modify the composition of the eastern judicial district of Arkansas, and for other purposes.	Pub. L. 116–73 (text) (PDF)
116-74	November 27, 2019	ONDCP Technical Corrections Act of 2019	To amend the Office of National Drug Control Policy Reauthorization Act of 1998 to make technical corrections.	Pub. L. 116–74 (text) (PDF)
116-75	November 27, 2019	Reauthorizing Security for Supreme Court Justices Act of 2019	To authorize the Marshal of the Supreme Court and the Supreme Court Police to protect the Justices, employees, and official guests of the Supreme Court outside of the Supreme Court grounds, and for other purposes.	Pub. L. 116–75 (text) (PDF)
116-76	November 27, 2019	Hong Kong Human Rights and Democracy Act	To amend the Hong Kong Policy Act of 1992, and for other purposes.	Pub. L. 116–76 (text) (PDF)
116-77	November 27, 2019	(No short title)	A bill to prohibit the commercial export of covered munitions items to the Hong Kong Police Force	Pub. L. 116–77 (text) (PDF)
116-78	December 5, 2019	(No short title)	To amend section 442 of title 18, United States Code, to exempt certain interests in mutual funds, unit investment trusts, employee benefit plans, and retirement plans from conflict of interest limitations for the Government Publishing Office.	Pub. L. 116–78 (text) (PDF)
116-79	December 12, 2019	(No short title)	To designate the facility of the United States Postal Service located at 877 East 1200 South in Orem, Utah, as the "Jerry C. Washburn Post Office Building".	Pub. L. 116–79 (text) (PDF)
116-80	December 12, 2019	(No short title)	To designate the facility of the United States Postal Service located at 6531 Van Nuys Boulevard in Van Nuys, California, as the "Marilyn Monroe Post Office".	Pub. L. 116–80 (text) (PDF)
116-81	December 12, 2019	(No short title)	To designate the facility of the United States Postal Service located at 13507 Van Nuys Boulevard in Pacoima, California, as the "Ritchie Valens Post Office Building".	Pub. L. 116–81 (text) (PDF)
116-82	December 12, 2019	(No short title)	To designate the facility of the United States Postal Service located at 200 Israel Road Southeast in Tumwater, Washington, as the "Eva G. Hewitt Post Office".	Pub. L. 116–82 (text) (PDF)
116-83	December 12, 2019	(No short title)	To designate the facility of the United States Postal Service located at 66 Grove Court in Elgin, Illinois, as the "Corporal Alex Martinez Memorial Post Office Building".	Pub. L. 116–83 (text) (PDF)
116-84	December 13, 2019	(No short title)	To designate the facility of the United States Postal Service located at 1100 West Kent Avenue in Missoula, Montana, as the "Jeannette Rankin Post Office Building".	Pub. L. 116–84 (text) (PDF)
116-85	December 13, 2019	(No short title)	To designate the facility of the United States Postal Service located at 7722 South Main Street in Pine Plains, New York, as the "Senior Chief Petty Officer Shannon M. Kent Post Office".	Pub. L. 116–85 (text) (PDF)
116-86	December 13, 2019	(No short title)	To designate the facility of the United States Postal Service located at 100 Calle Alondra in San Juan, Puerto Rico, as the "65th Infantry Regiment Post Office Building".	Pub. L. 116–86 (text) (PDF)
116-87	December 13, 2019	(No short title)	To designate the Department of Veterans Affairs community-based outpatient clinic in Odessa, Texas, as the "Wilson and Young Medal of Honor VA Clinic".	Pub. L. 116–87 (text) (PDF)
116-88	December 13, 2019	(No short title)	To designate the facility of the United States Postal Service located at 575 Dexter Street in Central Falls, Rhode Island, as the "Elizabeth Buffum Chace Post Office".	Pub. L. 116–88 (text) (PDF)
116-89	December 13, 2019	(No short title)	To designate the facility of the United States Postal Service located at 8520 Michigan Avenue in Whittier, California, as the "Jose Ramos Post Office Building".	Pub. L. 116–89 (text) (PDF)
116-90	December 13, 2019	(No short title)	To designate the facility of the United States Postal Service located at 1750 McCulloch Boulevard North in Lake Havasu City, Arizona, as the "Lake Havasu City Combat Veterans Memorial Post Office Building".	Pub. L. 116–90 (text) (PDF)
116-91	December 19, 2019	Fostering Undergraduate Talent by Unlocking Resources for Education Act (or FUTURE Act)	To reauthorize mandatory funding programs for historically Black colleges and universities and other minority-serving institutions, and for other purposes.	Pub. L. 116–91 (text) (PDF)
116-92	December 20, 2019	National Defense Authorization Act for Fiscal Year 2020	To authorize appropriations for fiscal year 2020 for military activities of the Department of Defense, for military construction, and for defense activities of the Department of Energy, to prescribe military personnel strengths for such fiscal year, and for other purposes.	Pub. L. 116–92 (text) (PDF)
116-93	December 20, 2019	Consolidated Appropriations Act, 2020	Making consolidated appropriations for the fiscal year ending September 30, 2020, and for other purposes.	Pub. L. 116–93 (text) (PDF)
116-94	December 20, 2019	Further Consolidated Appropriations Act, 2020	Making further consolidated appropriations for the fiscal year ending September 30, 2020, and for other purposes.	Pub. L. 116–94 (text) (PDF)
116-95	December 20, 2019	(No short title)	An act to reauthorize the West Valley demonstration project, and for other purposes.	Pub. L. 116–95 (text) (PDF)
116-96	December 20, 2019	Support for Suicide Prevention Coordinators Act	To direct the Comptroller General of the United States to conduct an assessment of the responsibilities, workload, and vacancy rates of Department of Veterans Affairs suicide prevention coordinators, and for other purposes.	Pub. L. 116–96 (text) (PDF)
116-97	December 20, 2019	Vera C. Rubin Observatory Designation Act	To designate the Large Synoptic Survey Telescope as the "Vera C. Rubin Observatory".	Pub. L. 116–97 (text) (PDF)
116-98	December 20, 2019	Virginia Beach Strong Act	To accelerate the income tax benefits for charitable cash contributions for the relief of the families of victims of the mass shooting in Virginia Beach, Virginia, on May 31, 2019.	Pub. L. 116–98 (text) (PDF)
116-99	December 20, 2019	Columbia River In-Lieu and Treaty Fishing Access Sites Improvement Act	To authorize the Secretary of the Interior to assess sanitation and safety conditions at Bureau of Indian Affairs facilities that were constructed to provide affected Columbia River Treaty tribes access to traditional fishing grounds and expend funds on construction of facilities and structures to improve those conditions, and for other purposes.	Pub. L. 116–99 (text) (PDF)
116-100	December 20, 2019	Spokane Tribe of Indians of the Spokane Reservation Equitable Compensation Act	To provide for equitable compensation to the Spokane Tribe of Indians of the Spokane Reservation for the use of tribal land for the production of hydropower by the Grand Coulee Dam, and for other purposes.	Pub. L. 116–100 (text) (PDF)
116-101	December 20, 2019	Esther Martinez Native American Languages Programs Reauthorization Act	To amend the Native American Programs Act of 1974 to provide flexibility and reauthorization to ensure the survival and continuing vitality of Native American languages.	Pub. L. 116–101 (text) (PDF)
116-102	December 24, 2019	Building Blocks of STEM Act	To direct the National Science Foundation to support STEM education research focused on early childhood.	Pub. L. 116–102 (text) (PDF)
116-103	December 30, 2019	Grant Reporting Efficiency and Agreements Transparency Act of 2019 (or GREAT Act)	To modernize Federal grant reporting, and for other purposes.	Pub. L. 116–103 (text) (PDF)
116-104	December 30, 2019	Debbie Smith Reauthorization Act of 2019	To reauthorize programs authorized under the Debbie Smith Act of 2004.	Pub. L. 116–104 (text) (PDF)
116-105	December 30, 2019	Pallone-Thune Telephone Robocall Abuse Criminal Enforcement and Deterrence Act (or Pallone-Thune TRACED Act)	To deter criminal robocall violations and improve enforcement of section 227(b) of the Communications Act of 1934, and for other purposes.	Pub. L. 116–105 (text) (PDF)
116-106	January 7, 2020	Fallen Warrior Battlefield Cross Memorial Act	To amend title 38, United States Code, to ensure the Secretary of Veterans Affairs permits the display of Fallen Soldier Displays in national cemeteries.	Pub. L. 116–106 (text) (PDF)
116-107	January 17, 2020	(No short title)	To permit the Secretary of Veterans Affairs to establish a grant program to conduct cemetery research and produce educational materials for the Veterans Legacy Program.	Pub. L. 116–107 (text) (PDF)
116-108	January 24, 2020	Securing American Nonprofit Organizations Against Terrorism Act of 2019	To amend the Homeland Security Act of 2002 to provide funding to secure nonprofit facilities from terrorist attacks, and for other purposes.	Pub. L. 116–108 (text) (PDF)
116-109	January 24, 2020	Preventing Illegal Radio Abuse Through Enforcement Act (or PIRATE Act)	To amend the Communications Act of 1934 to provide for enhanced penalties for pirate radio, and for other purposes.	Pub. L. 116–109 (text) (PDF)
116-110	January 27, 2020	(No short title)	An act to rename the Oyster Bay National Wildlife Refuge as the "Congressman Lester Wolff Oyster Bay National Wildlife Refuge".	Pub. L. 116–110 (text) (PDF)
116-111	January 27, 2020	Emancipation National Historic Trail Study Act	To amend the National Trails System Act to provide for the study of the Emancipation National Historic Trail, and for other purposes.	Pub. L. 116–111 (text) (PDF)
116-112	January 27, 2020	President George H.W. Bush and First Spouse Barbara Bush Coin Act	To require that $1 coins issued during 2019 honor President George H. W. Bush and to direct the Secretary of the Treasury to issue bullion coins during 2019 in honor of Barbara Bush.	Pub. L. 116–112 (text) (PDF)
116-113	January 29, 2020	United States–Mexico–Canada Agreement Implementation Act	To implement the Agreement between the United States of America, the United Mexican States, and Canada attached as an Annex to the Protocol Replacing the North American Free Trade Agreement.	Pub. L. 116–113 (text) (PDF)
116-114	February 6, 2020	Temporary Reauthorization and Study of the Emergency Scheduling of Fentanyl Analogues Act	To extend the temporary scheduling order for fentanyl-related substances, and for other purposes.	Pub. L. 116–114 (text) (PDF)
116-115	February 11, 2020	Supporting Veterans in STEM Careers Act	To promote veteran involvement in STEM education, computer science, and scientific research, and for other purposes.	Pub. L. 116–115 (text) (PDF)
116-116	March 2, 2020	DHS Field Engagement Accountability Act	To amend the Homeland Security Act of 2002 to require the Department of Homeland Security to develop an engagement strategy with fusion centers, and for other purposes.	Pub. L. 116–116 (text) (PDF)
116-117	March 2, 2020	Payment Integrity Information Act of 2019	To improve efforts to identify and reduce Governmentwide improper payments, and for other purposes.	Pub. L. 116–117 (text) (PDF)
116-118	March 2, 2020	A joint resolution providing for the reappointment of John Fahey as a citizen regent of the Board of Regents of the Smithsonian Institution.	Providing for the reappointment of John Fahey as a citizen regent of the Board of Regents of the Smithsonian Institution.	Pub. L. 116–118 (text) (PDF)
116-119	March 2, 2020	A joint resolution providing for the reappointment of Risa Lavizzo-Mourey as a citizen regent of the Board of Regents of the Smithsonian Institution.	Providing for the reappointment of Risa Lavizzo-Mourey as a citizen regent of the Board of Regents of the Smithsonian Institution.	Pub. L. 116–119 (text) (PDF)
116-120	March 3, 2020	(No short title)	Approving the request of the Secretary of Veterans Affairs for a waiver under section 1703E(f) of title 38, United States Code.	Pub. L. 116–120 (text) (PDF)
116-121	March 3, 2020	Presidential Transition Enhancement Act of 2019	To amend the Presidential Transition Act of 1963 to improve the orderly transfer of the executive power during Presidential transitions.	Pub. L. 116–121 (text) (PDF)
116-122	March 3, 2020	Protecting America's Food and Agriculture Act of 2019	To increase the number of CBP Agriculture Specialists and support staff in the Office of Field Operations of U.S. Customs and Border Protection, and for other purposes.	Pub. L. 116–122 (text) (PDF)
116-123	March 6, 2020	Coronavirus Preparedness and Response Supplemental Appropriations Act, 2020	Making emergency supplemental appropriations for the fiscal year ending September 30, 2020, and for other purposes.	Pub. L. 116–123 (text) (PDF)
116-124	March 12, 2020	Secure and Trusted Communications Networks Act of 2019	To prohibit certain Federal subsidies from being used to purchase communications equipment or services posing national security risks, to provide for the establishment of a reimbursement program for the replacement of communications equipment or services posing such risks, and for other purposes.	Pub. L. 116–124 (text) (PDF)
116-125	March 13, 2020	Merchant Mariners of World War II Congressional Gold Medal Act of 2020	To award a Congressional Gold Medal, collectively, to the United States Merchant Mariners of World War II, in recognition of their dedicated and vital service during World War II.	Pub. L. 116–125 (text) (PDF)
116-126	March 18, 2020	Representative Payee Fraud Prevention Act of 2019	To amend title 5, United States Code, to prevent fraud by representative payees.	Pub. L. 116–126 (text) (PDF)
116-127	March 18, 2020	Families First Coronavirus Response Act	Making emergency supplemental appropriations for the fiscal year ending September 30, 2020, and for other purposes.	Pub. L. 116–127 (text) (PDF)
116-128	March 21, 2020	(No short title)	A bill to authorize the Secretary of Veterans Affairs to treat certain programs of education converted to distance learning by reason of emergencies and health-related situations in the same manner as programs of education pursued at educational institutions, and for other purposes.	Pub. L. 116–128 (text) (PDF)
116-129	March 23, 2020	Secure 5G and Beyond Act of 2020	To require the President to develop a strategy to ensure the security of next generation mobile telecommunications systems and infrastructure in the United States and to assist allies and strategic partners in maximizing the security of next generation mobile telecommunications systems, infrastructure, and software, and for other purposes.	Pub. L. 116–129 (text) (PDF)
116-130	March 23, 2020	Broadband Deployment Accuracy and Technological Availability Act (or Broadband DATA Act)	To require the Federal Communications Commission to issue rules relating to the collection of data with respect to the availability of broadband services, and for other purposes.	Pub. L. 116–130 (text) (PDF)
116-131	March 25, 2020	Supporting Older Americans Act of 2020	To amend the Older Americans Act of 1965 to authorize appropriations for fiscal years 2020 through 2024, and for other purposes.	Pub. L. 116–131 (text) (PDF)
116-132	March 26, 2020	(No short title)	To make technical corrections to the Guam World War II Loyalty Recognition Act.	Pub. L. 116–132 (text) (PDF)
116-133	March 26, 2020	Citizenship for Children of Military Members and Civil Servants Act	To facilitate the automatic acquisition of citizenship for lawful permanent resident children of military and Federal Government personnel residing abroad, and for other purposes.	Pub. L. 116–133 (text) (PDF)
116-134	March 26, 2020	Support for Veterans in Effective Apprenticeships Act of 2019	To enable registered apprenticeship programs to better serve veterans, and for other purposes.	Pub. L. 116–134 (text) (PDF)
116-135	March 26, 2020	Taiwan Allies International Protection and Enhancement Initiative (TAIPEI) Act of 2019	To express United States support for Taiwan's diplomatic alliances around the world.	Pub. L. 116–135 (text) (PDF)
116-136	March 27, 2020	Coronavirus Aid, Relief, and Economic Security Act	To amend the Internal Revenue Code of 1986 to repeal the excise tax on high cost employer-sponsored health coverage.	Pub. L. 116–136 (text) (PDF)
116-137	April 10, 2020	VA Tele-Hearing Modernization Act	To amend title 38, United States Code, to permit appellants to appear in cases before the Board of Veterans’ Appeals by picture and voice transmission from locations other than facilities of the Department of Veterans Affairs, and for other purposes.	Pub. L. 116–137 (text) (PDF)
116-138	April 10, 2020	A joint resolution providing for the appointment of Denise O’Leary as a citizen regent of the Board of Regents of the Smithsonian Institution.	Providing for the appointment of Denise O’Leary as a citizen regent of the Board of Regents of the Smithsonian Institution.	Pub. L. 116–138 (text) (PDF)
116-139	April 24, 2020	Paycheck Protection Program and Health Care Enhancement Act	Making appropriations for the Department of the Interior, environment, and related agencies for the fiscal year ending September 30, 2019, and for other purposes.	Pub. L. 116–139 (text) (PDF)
116-140	April 28, 2020	Student Veteran Coronavirus Response Act of 2020	To make certain improvements in the educational assistance benefits under the laws administered by the Secretary of Veterans Affairs in the case of changes to courses of education by reason of emergency situations, and for other purposes.	Pub. L. 116–140 (text) (PDF)
116-141	May 29, 2020	Never Again Education Act	To authorize the Director of the United States Holocaust Memorial Museum to support Holocaust education programs, and for other purposes.	Pub. L. 116–141 (text) (PDF)
116-142	June 5, 2020	Paycheck Protection Program Flexibility Act of 2020	To amend the Small Business Act and the CARES Act to modify certain provisions related to the forgiveness of loans under the paycheck protection program, to allow recipients of loan forgiveness under the paycheck protection program to defer payroll taxes, and for other purposes.	Pub. L. 116–142 (text) (PDF)
116-143	June 16, 2020	Law Enforcement Suicide Data Collection Act	To require the Director of the Federal Bureau of Investigation to provide information on suicide rates in law enforcement, and for other purposes.	Pub. L. 116–143 (text) (PDF)
116-144	June 16, 2020	Major Medical Facility Authorization Act of 2020	To authorize major medical facility projects for the Department of Veterans Affairs for fiscal year 2020, and for other purposes.	Pub. L. 116–144 (text) (PDF)
116-145	June 17, 2020	Uyghur Human Rights Policy Act of 2020	To condemn gross human rights violations of ethnic Turkic Muslims in Xinjiang, and calling for an end to arbitrary detention, torture, and harassment of these communities inside and outside China.	Pub. L. 116–145 (text) (PDF)
116-146	July 2, 2020	(No short title)	To amend title 38, United States Code, to modify the limitation on pay for certain high-level employees and officers of the Department of Veterans Affairs.	Pub. L. 116–146 (text) (PDF)
116-147	July 4, 2020	(No short title)	To extend the authority for commitments for the paycheck protection program and separate amounts authorized for other loans under section 7(a) of the Small Business Act, and for other purposes.	Pub. L. 116–147 (text) (PDF)
116-148	July 13, 2020	Emergency Aid for Returning Americans Affected by Coronavirus Act	To amend section 1113 of the Social Security Act to provide authority for fiscal year 2020 for increased payments for temporary assistance to United States citizens returned from foreign countries, and for other purposes.	Pub. L. 116–148 (text) (PDF)
116-149	July 14, 2020	Hong Kong Autonomy Act	To impose sanctions with respect to foreign persons involved in the erosion of certain obligations of China with respect to Hong Kong, and for other purposes.	Pub. L. 116–149 (text) (PDF)
116-150	July 22, 2020	(No short title)	To extend the Chemical Facility Anti-Terrorism Standards Program of the Department of Homeland Security, and for other purposes.	Pub. L. 116–150 (text) (PDF)
116-151	August 3, 2020	Protecting Nonprofits from Catastrophic Cash Flow Strain Act of 2020	To amend title IX of the Social Security Act to improve emergency unemployment relief for governmental entities and nonprofit organizations.	Pub. L. 116–151 (text) (PDF)
116-152	August 4, 2020	Great American Outdoors Act	To amend title 54, United States Code, to establish, fund, and provide for the use of amounts in a National Parks and Public Land Legacy Restoration Fund to address the maintenance backlog of the National Park Service, the United States Fish and Wildlife Service, the Bureau of Land Management, the Forest Service, and the Bureau of Indian Education, and to provide permanent, dedicated funding for the Land and Water Conservation Fund, and for other purposes.	Pub. L. 116–152 (text) (PDF)
116-153	August 8, 2020	Veteran Treatment Court Coordination Act of 2019	To direct the Attorney General to establish and carry out a Veteran Treatment Court Program.	Pub. L. 116–153 (text) (PDF)
116-154	August 8, 2020	Ryan Kules and Paul Benne Specially Adaptive Housing Improvement Act of 2019	To amend title 38, United States Code, to provide for improvements to the specially adapted housing program and educational assistance programs of the Department of Veterans Affairs, and for other purposes.	Pub. L. 116–154 (text) (PDF)
116-155	August 8, 2020	Department of Veterans Affairs Contracting Preference Consistency Act of 2020	To amend title 38, United States Code, to provide for an exception to certain small business contracting requirements applicable to the Department of Veterans Affairs procurement of certain goods and services covered under the Ability One program, and for other purposes.	Pub. L. 116–155 (text) (PDF)
116-156	August 14, 2020	Commission on the Social Status of Black Men and Boys Act	To establish the Commission on the Social Status of Black Men and Boys, to study and make recommendations to address social problems affecting Black men and boys, and for other purposes.	Pub. L. 116–156 (text) (PDF)
116-157	August 14, 2020	Safeguarding America's First Responders Act of 2020	To extend public safety officer death benefits to public safety officers whose death is caused by COVID-19, and for other purposes.	Pub. L. 116–157 (text) (PDF)
116-158	August 14, 2020	(No short title)	A bill to amend the Servicemembers Civil Relief Act to extend lease protections for servicemembers under stop movement orders in response to a local, national, or global emergency, and for other purposes.	Pub. L. 116–158 (text) (PDF)
116-159	October 1, 2020	Continuing Appropriations Act, 2021 and Other Extensions Act	Making continuing appropriations for fiscal year 2021, and for other purposes.	Pub. L. 116–159 (text) (PDF)
116-160	October 1, 2020	Charging Helps Agencies Realize General Efficiencies Act	To require the Administrator of General Services to issue guidance to clarify that Federal agencies may pay by charge card for the charging of Federal electric motor vehicles, and for other purposes.	Pub. L. 116–160 (text) (PDF)
116-161	October 1, 2020	(No short title)	To designate the facility of the United States Postal Service located at 456 North Meridian Street in Indianapolis, Indiana, as the "Richard G. Lugar Post Office".	Pub. L. 116–161 (text) (PDF)
116-162	October 2, 2020	(No short title)	Providing for the reappointment of Michael M. Lynton as a citizen regent of the Board of Regents of the Smithsonian Institution.	Pub. L. 116–162 (text) (PDF)
116-163	October 2, 2020	(No short title)	Providing for the appointment of Franklin D. Raines as a citizen regent of the Board of Regents of the Smithsonian Institution.	Pub. L. 116–163 (text) (PDF)
116-164	October 10, 2020	Extension of the Caribbean Basin Economic Recovery Act	To extend certain provisions of the Caribbean Basin Economic Recovery Act until September 30, 2030, and for other purposes.	Pub. L. 116–164 (text) (PDF)
116-165	October 10, 2020	Savanna's Act	To direct the Attorney General to review, revise, and develop law enforcement and justice protocols appropriate to address missing and murdered Indians, and for other purposes.	Pub. L. 116–165 (text) (PDF)
116-166	October 10, 2020	Not Invisible Act of 2019	To increase intergovernmental coordination to identify and combat violent crime within Indian lands and of Indians.	Pub. L. 116–166 (text) (PDF)
116-167	October 13, 2020	B-47 Ridge Designation Act	To designate a mountain ridge in the State of Montana as "B–47 Ridge".	Pub. L. 116–167 (text) (PDF)
116-168	October 13, 2020	(No short title)	To designate the community-based outpatient clinic of the Department of Veterans Affairs in St. Augustine, Florida, as the "Leo C. Chase Jr. Department of Veterans Affairs Clinic".	Pub. L. 116–168 (text) (PDF)
116-169	October 13, 2020	(No short title)	To designate the clinic of the Department of Veterans Affairs in Bend, Oregon, as the "Robert D. Maxwell Department of Veterans Affairs Clinic".	Pub. L. 116–169 (text) (PDF)
116-170	October 17, 2020	Merrill's Marauders Congressional Gold Medal Act	To award a Congressional Gold Medal to the soldiers of the 5307th Composite Unit (Provisional), commonly known as "Merrill's Marauders", in recognition of their bravery and outstanding service in the jungles of Burma during World War II.	Pub. L. 116–170 (text) (PDF)
116-171	October 17, 2020	Commander John Scott Hannon Veterans Mental Health Care Improvement Act of 2019	To improve mental health care provided by the Department of Veterans Affairs, and for other purposes.	Pub. L. 116–171 (text) (PDF)
116-172	October 17, 2020	National Suicide Hotline Designation Act of 2020	To amend the Communications Act of 1934 to designate 9–8–8 as the universal telephone number for the purpose of the national suicide prevention and mental health crisis hotline system operating through the National Suicide Prevention Lifeline and through the Veterans Crisis Line, and for other purposes.	Pub. L. 116–172 (text) (PDF)
116-173	October 20, 2020	(No short title)	To extend the Undertaking Spam, Spyware, And Fraud Enforcement With Enforcers beyond Borders Act of 2006, and for other purposes.	Pub. L. 116–173 (text) (PDF)
116-174	October 20, 2020	Native American Business Incubators Program Act	To establish a business incubators program within the Department of the Interior to promote economic development in Indian reservation communities.	Pub. L. 116–174 (text) (PDF)
116-175	October 20, 2020	(No short title)	To nullify the Supplemental Treaty Between the United States of America and the Confederated Tribes and Bands of Indians of Middle Oregon, concluded on November 15, 1865.	Pub. L. 116–175 (text) (PDF)
116-176	October 20, 2020	Vet Center Eligibility Expansion Act	To amend title 38, United States Code, to furnish Vet Center readjustment counseling and related mental health services to certain individuals.	Pub. L. 116–176 (text) (PDF)
116-177	October 20, 2020	Veterans' Care Quality Transparency Act	To direct the Comptroller General of the United States to conduct an assessment of all memoranda of understanding and memoranda of agreement between Under Secretary of Health and non-Department of Veterans Affairs entities relating to suicide prevention and mental health services.	Pub. L. 116–177 (text) (PDF)
116-178	October 20, 2020	Veterans' Compensation Cost-of-Living Adjustment Act of 2020	To increase, effective as of December 1, 2020, the rates of Veterans' benefits with service-connected disabilities and the rates of dependency and indemnity compensation for the survivors of certain disabled veterans, and for other purposes.	Pub. L. 116–178 (text) (PDF)
116-179	October 20, 2020	Defending the Integrity of Voting Systems Act	To amend title 18, United States Code, to prohibit interference with voting systems under the Computer Fraud and Abuse Act.	Pub. L. 116–179 (text) (PDF)
116-180	October 21, 2020	Practical Reforms and Other Goals To Reinforce the Effectiveness of Self-Governance and Self-Determination for Indian Tribes Act of 2019	To amend the Indian Self-Determination and Education Assistance Act to provide further self-governance by Indian Tribes, and for other purposes.	Pub. L. 116–180 (text) (PDF)
116-181	October 21, 2020	Promoting Research and Observations of Space Weather to Improve the Forecasting of Tomorrow Act	To improve understanding and forecasting of space weather events, and for other purposes.	Pub. L. 116–181 (text) (PDF)
116-182	October 21, 2020	Due Process Protections Act	To amend the Federal Rules of Criminal Procedure to remind prosecutors of their obligations under Supreme Court case law.	Pub. L. 116–182 (text) (PDF)
116-183	October 30, 2020	Protecting Business Opportunities for Veterans Act of 2019	To amend title 38, United States Code, to improve the oversight of contracts awarded by the Secretary of Veterans Affairs to small business concerns owned and controlled by veterans, and for other purposes.	Pub. L. 116–183 (text) (PDF)
116-184	October 30, 2020	Intercountry Adoption Information Act of 2019	To amend the Intercountry Adoption Act of 2000 to require the Secretary of State to report on intercountry adoptions from countries which have significantly reduced adoption rates involving immigration to the United States, and for other purposes.	Pub. L. 116–184 (text) (PDF)
116-185	October 30, 2020	Whole Veteran Act	To direct the Secretary of Veterans Affairs to submit to Congress a report on the Department of Veterans Affairs advancing of whole health transformation.	Pub. L. 116–185 (text) (PDF)
116-186	October 30, 2020	(No short title)	To amend the Nutria Eradication and Control Act of 2003 to include California in the program, and for other purposes.	Pub. L. 116–186 (text) (PDF)
116-187	October 30, 2020	Identifying Barriers and Best Practices Study Act	To direct the Comptroller General of the United States to conduct a study on disability and pension benefits provided to members of the National Guard and members of reserve components of the Armed Forces by the Department of Veterans Affairs, and for other purposes.	Pub. L. 116–187 (text) (PDF)
116-188	October 30, 2020	America's Conservation Enhancement Act	To improve protections for wildlife, and for other purposes.	Pub. L. 116–188 (text) (PDF)
116-189	October 30, 2020	Empowering Olympic, Paralympic, and Amateur Athletes Act of 2020	To amend the Ted Stevens Olympic and Amateur Sports Act to provide for congressional oversight of the board of directors of the United States Olympic and Paralympic Committee and to protect amateur athletes from emotional, physical, and sexual abuse, and for other purposes.	Pub. L. 116–189 (text) (PDF)
116-190	October 30, 2020	Friendly Airports for Mothers Improvement Act	To amend Title 49 of the United States Code, to require small hub airports to construct areas for nursing mothers, and for other purposes.	Pub. L. 116–190 (text) (PDF)
116-191	October 30, 2020	(No short title)	To amend the Klamath Basin Water Supply Enhancement Act of 2000 to make certain technical corrections.	Pub. L. 116–191 (text) (PDF)
116-192	October 30, 2020	Reinvigorating Lending for the Future Act	To amend the Public Works and Economic Development Act of 1965 to provide for the release of certain Federal interests in connection with certain grants under that Act, and for other purposes.	Pub. L. 116–192 (text) (PDF)
116-193	October 30, 2020	(No short title)	To designate the airport traffic control tower located at Piedmont Triad International Airport in Greensboro, North Carolina, as the "Senator Kay Hagan Airport Traffic Control Tower".	Pub. L. 116–193 (text) (PDF)
116-194	December 3, 2020	Information Technology Modernization Centers of Excellence Program Act		Pub. L. 116–194 (text) (PDF)
116-195	December 3, 2020	Rosie the Riveter Congressional Gold Medal Act of 2019		Pub. L. 116–195 (text) (PDF)
116-196	December 3, 2020	(No short title)	To designate the facility of the United States Postal Service located at 35 Tulip Avenue in Floral Park, New York, as the "Lieutenant Michael R. Davidson Post Office Building".	Pub. L. 116–196 (text) (PDF)
116-197	December 3, 2020	(No short title)	To designate the facility of the United States Postal Service located at 114 Mill Street in Hookstown, Pennsylvania, as the "Staff Sergeant Dylan Elchin Post Office Building".	Pub. L. 116–197 (text) (PDF)
116-198	December 3, 2020	(No short title)	To permit the Scipio A. Jones Post Office in Little Rock, Arkansas, to accept and display a portrait of Scipio A. Jones, and for other purposes.	Pub. L. 116–198 (text) (PDF)
116-199	December 3, 2020	(No short title)	To designate the facility of the United States Postal Service located at 5186 Benito Street in Montclair, California, as the "Paul Eaton Post Office Building".	Pub. L. 116–199 (text) (PDF)
116-200	December 3, 2020	(No short title)	To designate the facility of the United States Postal Service located at 171 South Maple Street in Dana, Indiana, as the "Ernest 'Ernie' T. Pyle Post Office".	Pub. L. 116–200 (text) (PDF)
116-201	December 3, 2020	(No short title)	To designate the facility of the United States Postal Service located at 8320 13th Avenue in Brooklyn, New York, as the "Mother Frances Xavier Cabrini Post Office Building".	Pub. L. 116–201 (text) (PDF)
116-202	December 3, 2020	(No short title)	To designate the facility of the United States Postal Service located at 2505 Derita Avenue in Charlotte, North Carolina, as the "Julius L. Chambers Civil Rights Memorial Post Office".	Pub. L. 116–202 (text) (PDF)
116-203	December 3, 2020	(No short title)	To designate the facility of the United States Postal Service located at 3703 North Main Street in Farmville, North Carolina, as the "Walter B. Jones Jr. Post Office".	Pub. L. 116–203 (text) (PDF)
116-204	December 3, 2020	(No short title)	To designate the facility of the United States Postal Service located at 100 Crosby Street in Mansfield, Louisiana, as the "Dr. C. O. Simpkins Sr., Post Office".	Pub. L. 116–204 (text) (PDF)
116-205	December 3, 2020	Wounded Veterans Recreation Act	To amend the Federal Lands Recreation Enhancement Act to provide for a lifetime National Recreational Pass for any veteran with a service-connected disability.	Pub. L. 116–205 (text) (PDF)
116-206	December 4, 2020	Rodchenkov Anti-Doping Act of 2019	To impose criminal sanctions on certain persons involved in international doping fraud conspiracies, to provide restitution for victims of such conspiracies, and to require sharing of information with the United States Anti-Doping Agency to assist its fight against doping, and for other purposes.	Pub. L. 116–206 (text) (PDF)
116-207	December 4, 2020	Internet of Things Cybersecurity Improvement Act of 2020	To establish minimum security standards for Internet of Things devices owned or controlled by the Federal Government, and for other purposes.	Pub. L. 116–207 (text) (PDF)
116-208	December 4, 2020	Greg LeMond Congressional Gold Medal Act	To award a Congressional Gold Medal to Greg LeMond in recognition of his service to the United States as an athlete, activist, role model, and community leader.	Pub. L. 116–208 (text) (PDF)
116-209	December 4, 2020	Negro Leagues Baseball Centennial Commemorative Coin Act	To require the Secretary of the Treasury to mint a coin in commemoration of the 100th anniversary of the establishment of Negro league baseball.	Pub. L. 116–209 (text) (PDF)
116-210	December 4, 2020	(No short title)	To authorize the President to posthumously award the Medal of Honor to Alwyn C. Cashe for acts of valor during Operation Iraqi Freedom.	Pub. L. 116–210 (text) (PDF)
116-211	December 4, 2020	Impact Aid Coronavirus Relief Act	To provide that, due to the disruptions caused by COVID-19, applications for impact aid funding for fiscal year 2022 may use certain data submitted in the fiscal year 2021 application.	Pub. L. 116–211 (text) (PDF)
116-212	December 4, 2020	Improving Safety and Security for Veterans Act of 2019	To require the Secretary of Veterans Affairs to submit to Congress reports on patient safety and quality of care at medical centers of the Department of Veterans Affairs, and for other purposes.	Pub. L. 116–212 (text) (PDF)
116-213	December 4, 2020	Department of Veterans Affairs Website Accessibility Act of 2019	To direct the Secretary of Veterans Affairs to conduct a study regarding the accessibility of websites of the Department of Veterans Affairs to individuals with disabilities.	Pub. L. 116–213 (text) (PDF)
116-214	December 5, 2020	Veterans Comprehensive Prevention, Access to Care, and Treatment Act of 2020 (Veterans' COMPACT Act)	To make certain improvements relating to the transition of individuals to services from the Department of Veterans Affairs, suicide prevention for veterans, and care and services for women veterans, and for other purposes.	Pub. L. 116–214 (text) (PDF)
116-215	December 11, 2020	Further Continuing Appropriations Act, 2021, and Other Extensions Act	Making further continuing appropriations for fiscal year 2021, and for other purposes.	Pub. L. 116–215 (text) (PDF), H.R. 8900, 134 Stat. 1041, enacted December 11, 2020
116-216	December 11, 2020	United States Grain Standards Reauthorization Act of 2020	To reauthorize the United States Grain Standards Act, and for other purposes.	Pub. L. 116–216 (text) (PDF), S. 4054, 134 Stat. 1048, enacted December 11, 2020
116-217	December 17, 2020	(No short title)	To authorize the Every Word We Utter Monument to establish a commemorative work in the District of Columbia and its environs, and for other purposes.	Pub. L. 116–217 (text) (PDF), H.R. 473, 134 Stat. 1052, enacted December 17, 2020
116-218	December 17, 2020	(No short title)	To designate the facility of the United States Postal Service located at 1201 Sycamore Square Drive in Midlothian, Virginia, as the "Dorothy Braden Bruce Post Office Building".	Pub. L. 116–218 (text) (PDF), H.R. 4975, 134 Stat. 1054, enacted December 17, 2020
116-219	December 17, 2020	(No short title)	To designate the facility of the United States Postal Service located at 9930 Conroy Windermere Road in Windermere, Florida, as the "Officer Robert German Post Office Building".	Pub. L. 116–219 (text) (PDF), H.R. 5062, 134 Stat. 1055, enacted December 17, 2020
116-220	December 17, 2020	(No short title)	To designate the facility of the United States Postal Service located at 115 Nicol Avenue in Thomasville, Alabama, as the "Postmaster Robert Ingram Post Office".	Pub. L. 116–220 (text) (PDF), H.R. 5307, 134 Stat. 1056, enacted December 17, 2020
116-221	December 18, 2020	National Sea Grant College Program Amendments Act of 2020	To reauthorize and amend the National Sea Grant College Program Act, and for other purposes.	Pub. L. 116–221 (text) (PDF), S. 910, 134 Stat. 1057, enacted December 18, 2020
116-222	December 18, 2020	Holding Foreign Companies Accountable Act	To amend the Sarbanes-Oxley Act of 2002 to require certain issuers to disclose to the Securities and Exchange Commission information regarding foreign jurisdictions that prevent the Public Company Accounting Oversight Board from performing inspections under that Act, and for other purposes.	Pub. L. 116–222 (text) (PDF), S. 945, 134 Stat. 1063, enacted December 18, 2020
116-223	December 18, 2020	Digital Coast Act	To require the Secretary of Commerce, acting through the Administrator of the National Oceanic and Atmospheric Administration, to establish a constituent-driven program to provide a digital information platform capable of efficiently integrating coastal data with decision-support tools, training, and best practices and to support collection of priority coastal geospatial data to inform and improve local, State, regional, and Federal capacities to manage the coastal region, and for other purposes.	Pub. L. 116–223 (text) (PDF), S. 1069, 134 Stat. 1067, enacted December 18, 2020
116-224	December 18, 2020	Save Our Seas 2.0 Act	To improve efforts to combat marine debris, and for other purposes.	Pub. L. 116–224 (text) (PDF), S. 1982, 134 Stat. 1072, enacted December 18, 2020
116-225	December 18, 2020	Further Additional Continuing Appropriations Act, 2021	Making further continuing appropriations for fiscal year 2021, and for other purposes.	Pub. L. 116–225 (text) (PDF), H.J.Res. 107, 134 Stat. 1098, enacted December 18, 2020
116-226	December 18, 2020	Extension of Continuing Appropriations Act, 2021	Making further continuing appropriations for fiscal year 2021, and for other purposes.	Pub. L. 116–226 (text) (PDF), H.J.Res. 110, 134 Stat. 1099, enacted December 18, 2020
116-227	December 21, 2020	(No short title)	To designate the facility of the United States Postal Service located at 201 West Cherokee Street in Brookhaven, Mississippi, as the "Deputy Donald William Durr, Corporal Zach Moak, and Patrolman James White Memorial Post Office Building".	Pub. L. 116–227 (text) (PDF), H.R. 2246, 134 Stat. 1100, enacted December 21, 2020
116-228	December 21, 2020	(No short title)	To designate the facility of the United States Postal Service located at 123 East Sharpfish Street in Rosebud, South Dakota, as the "Ben Reifel Post Office Building".	Pub. L. 116–228 (text) (PDF), H.R. 2454, 134 Stat. 1101, enacted December 21, 2020
116-229	December 21, 2020	(No short title)	To designate the facility of the United States Postal Service located at 1401 1st Street North in Winter Haven, Florida, as the "Althea Margaret Daily Mills Post Office Building".	Pub. L. 116–229 (text) (PDF), H.R. 2969, 134 Stat. 1102, enacted December 21, 2020
116-230	December 21, 2020	(No short title)	To designate the facility of the United States Postal Service located at 13308 Midland Road in Poway, California, as the "Ray Chavez Post Office Building".	Pub. L. 116–230 (text) (PDF), H.R. 3005, 134 Stat. 1103, enacted December 21, 2020
116-231	December 21, 2020	(No short title)	To designate the facility of the United States Postal Service located at 340 Wetmore Avenue in Grand River, Ohio, as the "Lance Corporal Andy 'Ace' Nowacki Post Office".	Pub. L. 116–231 (text) (PDF), H.R. 3275, 134 Stat. 1104, enacted December 21, 2020
116-232	December 21, 2020	(No short title)	To designate the facility of the United States Postal Service located at 415 North Main Street in Henning, Tennessee, as the "Paula Croom Robinson and Judy Spray Memorial Post Office Building".	Pub. L. 116–232 (text) (PDF), H.R. 3680, 134 Stat. 1105, enacted December 21, 2020
116-233	December 21, 2020	(No short title)	To designate the facility of the United States Postal Service located at 117 West Poythress Street in Hopewell, Virginia, as the "Reverend Curtis West Harris Post Office Building".	Pub. L. 116–233 (text) (PDF), H.R. 3847, 134 Stat. 1106, enacted December 21, 2020
116-234	December 21, 2020	(No short title)	To designate the facility of the United States Postal Service located at 511 West 165th Street in New York, New York, as the "Normandia Maldonado Post Office Building".	Pub. L. 116–234 (text) (PDF), H.R. 3870, 134 Stat. 1107, enacted December 21, 2020
116-235	December 21, 2020	(No short title)	To designate the facility of the United States Postal Service located at 602 Pacific Avenue in Bremerton, Washington, as the "John Henry Turpin Post Office Building".	Pub. L. 116–235 (text) (PDF), H.R. 4034, 134 Stat. 1108, enacted December 21, 2020
116-236	December 21, 2020	(No short title)	To designate the facility of the United States Postal Service located at 321 South 1st Street in Montrose, Colorado, as the "Sergeant David Kinterknecht Post Office".	Pub. L. 116–236 (text) (PDF), H.R. 4200, 134 Stat. 1109, enacted December 21, 2020
116-237	December 21, 2020	(No short title)	To designate the facility of the United States Postal Service located at 445 Main Street in Laceyville, Pennsylvania, as the "Melinda Gene Piccotti Post Office".	Pub. L. 116–237 (text) (PDF), H.R. 4279, 134 Stat. 1110, enacted December 21, 2020
116-238	December 21, 2020	(No short title)	To designate the facility of the United States Postal Service located at 21701 Stevens Creek Boulevard in Cupertino, California, as the "Petty Officer 2nd Class (SEAL) Matthew G. Axelson Post Office Building".	Pub. L. 116–238 (text) (PDF), H.R. 4672, 134 Stat. 1111, enacted December 21, 2020
116-239	December 21, 2020	(No short title)	To designate the facility of the United States Postal Service located at 8585 Criterion Drive in Colorado Springs, Colorado, as the "Chaplain (Capt.) Dale Goetz Memorial Post Office Building".	Pub. L. 116–239 (text) (PDF), H.R. 4725, 134 Stat. 1112, enacted December 21, 2020
116-240	December 21, 2020	(No short title)	To designate the facility of the United States Postal Service located at 1305 U.S. Highway 90 West in Castroville, Texas, as the "Lance Corporal Rhonald Dain Rairdan Post Office".	Pub. L. 116–240 (text) (PDF), H.R. 4785, 134 Stat. 1113, enacted December 21, 2020
116-241	December 21, 2020	(No short title)	To designate the facility of the United States Postal Service located at 2201 E. Maple Street in North Canton, Ohio, as the "Lance Cpl. Stacy 'Annie' Dryden Post Office".	Pub. L. 116–241 (text) (PDF), H.R. 4875, 134 Stat. 1114, enacted December 21, 2020
116-242	December 21, 2020	(No short title)	To designate the facility of the United States Postal Service located at 15 East Market Street in Leesburg, Virginia, as the "Norman Duncan Post Office Building".	Pub. L. 116–242 (text) (PDF), H.R. 4971, 134 Stat. 1115, enacted December 21, 2020
116-243	December 21, 2020	(No short title)	To designate the facility of the United States Postal Service located at 315 Addicks Howell Road in Houston, Texas, as the "Deputy Sandeep Singh Dhaliwal Post Office Building".	Pub. L. 116–243 (text) (PDF), H.R. 5317, 134 Stat. 1116, enacted December 21, 2020
116-244	December 21, 2020	(No short title)	To designate the facility of the United States Postal Service located at 108 West Maple Street in Holly, Michigan, as the "Holly Veterans Memorial Post Office".	Pub. L. 116–244 (text) (PDF), H.R. 5954, 134 Stat. 1117, enacted December 21, 2020
116-245	December 21, 2020	(No short title)	To designate the United States courthouse located at 351 South West Temple in Salt Lake City, Utah, as the "Orrin G. Hatch United States Courthouse".	Pub. L. 116–245 (text) (PDF), S. 4902, 134 Stat. 1118, enacted December 21, 2020
116-246	December 22, 2020	Further Extension of Continuing Appropriations Act, 2021	Making further continuing appropriations for fiscal year 2021, and for other purposes.	Pub. L. 116–246 (text) (PDF), H.R. 1520, 134 Stat. 1119, enacted December 22, 2020
116-247	December 22, 2020	National Purple Heart Hall of Honor Commemorative Coin Act	To require the Secretary of the Treasury to mint coins in commemoration of the National Purple Heart Hall of Honor.	Pub. L. 116–247 (text) (PDF), H.R. 1830, 134 Stat. 1120, enacted December 22, 2020
116-248	December 22, 2020	Republic of Texas Legation Memorial Act	To authorize the Daughters of the Republic of Texas to establish the Republic of Texas Legation Memorial as a commemorative work in the District of Columbia, and for other purposes.	Pub. L. 116–248 (text) (PDF), H.R. 3349, 134 Stat. 1124, enacted December 22, 2020
116-249	December 22, 2020	Combat Online Predators Act	To amend title 18, United States Code, with regard to stalking.	Pub. L. 116–249 (text) (PDF), S. 134, 134 Stat. 1126, enacted December 22, 2020
116-250	December 22, 2020	ALS Disability Insurance Access Act of 2019	To amend title II of the Social Security Act to eliminate the five-month waiting period for disability insurance benefits under such title for individuals with amyotrophic lateral sclerosis.	Pub. L. 116–250 (text) (PDF), S. 578, 134 Stat. 1128, enacted December 22, 2020
116-251	December 22, 2020	Stop Student Debt Relief Scams Act of 2019	To explicitly make unauthorized access to Department of Education information technology systems and the misuse of identification devices issued by the Department of Education a criminal act.	Pub. L. 116–251 (text) (PDF), S. 1153, 134 Stat. 1129, enacted December 22, 2020
116-252	December 22, 2020	Promoting Alzheimer's Awareness to Prevent Elder Abuse Act	To amend the Elder Abuse Prevention and Prosecution Act to improve the prevention of elder abuse and exploitation of individuals with Alzheimer's disease and related dementias.	Pub. L. 116–252 (text) (PDF), S. 3703, 134 Stat. 1133, enacted December 22, 2020
116-253	December 23, 2020	Fallen Journalists Memorial Act	To authorize the Fallen Journalists Memorial Foundation to establish a commemorative work in the District of Columbia and its environs, and for other purposes.	Pub. L. 116–253 (text) (PDF), H.R. 3465, 134 Stat. 1135, enacted December 23, 2020
116-254	December 23, 2020	DHS Opioid Detection Resilience Act of 2019	To ensure U.S. Customs and Border Protection officers, agents, and other personnel have adequate synthetic opioid detection equipment, that the Department of Homeland Security has a process to update synthetic opioid detection capability, and for other purposes.	Pub. L. 116–254 (text) (PDF), H.R. 4761, 134 Stat. 1137, enacted December 23, 2020
116-255	December 23, 2020	Leech Lake Band of Ojibwe Reservation Restoration Act	To provide for the transfer of certain Federal land in the State of Minnesota for the benefit of the Leech Lake Band of Ojibwe.	Pub. L. 116–255 (text) (PDF), S. 199, 134 Stat. 1139, enacted December 23, 2020
116-256	December 23, 2020	Route 66 Centennial Commission Act	To establish the Route 66 Centennial Commission, and for other purposes.	Pub. L. 116–256 (text) (PDF), S. 1014, 134 Stat. 1142, enacted December 23, 2020
116-257	December 23, 2020	Criminal Antitrust Anti-Retaliation Act of 2019	To provide anti-retaliation protections for antitrust whistleblowers.	Pub. L. 116–257 (text) (PDF), S. 2258, 134 Stat. 1147, enacted December 23, 2020
116-258	December 23, 2020	Identifying Outputs of Generative Adversarial Networks Act (IOGAN Act)	To direct the Director of the National Science Foundation to support research on the outputs that may be generated by generative adversarial networks, otherwise known as deepfakes, and other comparable techniques that may be developed in the future, and for other purposes.	Pub. L. 116–258 (text) (PDF), S. 2904, 134 Stat. 1150, enacted December 23, 2020
116-259	December 23, 2020	National Oceanic and Atmospheric Administration Commissioned Officer Corps Amendments Act of 2020	To reauthorize and amend the National Oceanic and Atmospheric Administration Commissioned Officer Corps Act of 2002, and for other purposes.	Pub. L. 116–259 (text) (PDF), S. 2981, 134 Stat. 1153, enacted December 23, 2020
116-260	December 27, 2020	Consolidated Appropriations Act, 2021	Making consolidated appropriations for the fiscal year ending September 30, 2021, providing coronavirus emergency response and relief, and for other purposes.	Pub. L. 116–260 (text) (PDF), H.R. 133, 134 Stat. 1182, enacted December 27, 2020
116-261	December 30, 2020	Indian Community Economic Enhancement Act of 2020	To amend the Native American Business Development, Trade Promotion, and Tourism Act of 2000, the Buy Indian Act, and the Native American Programs Act of 1974 to provide industry and economic development opportunities to Indian communities.	Pub. L. 116–261 (text) (PDF), S. 212, 134 Stat. 3306, enacted December 30, 2020
116-262	December 30, 2020	(No short title)	To designate the community-based outpatient clinic of the Department of Veterans Affairs in Bozeman, Montana, as the "Travis W. Atkins Department of Veterans Affairs Clinic".	Pub. L. 116–262 (text) (PDF), S. 900, 134 Stat. 3315, enacted December 30, 2020
116-263	December 30, 2020	Neil A. Armstrong Test Facility Act	To redesignate the NASA John H. Glenn Research Center at Plum Brook Station, Ohio, as the "NASA John H. Glenn Research Center at the Neil A. Armstrong Test Facility".	Pub. L. 116–263 (text) (PDF), S. 2472, 134 Stat. 3316, enacted December 30, 2020
116-264	December 30, 2020	(No short title)	To designate the facility of the United States Postal Service located at 311 West Wisconsin Avenue in Tomahawk, Wisconsin, as the "Einar 'Sarge' H. Ingman Jr. Post Office Building".	Pub. L. 116–264 (text) (PDF), S. 3257, 134 Stat. 3318, enacted December 30, 2020
116-265	December 30, 2020	(No short title)	To designate the facility of the United States Postal Service located at 2600 Wesley Street in Greenville, Texas, as the "Audie Murphy Post Office Building".	Pub. L. 116–265 (text) (PDF), S. 3461, 134 Stat. 3319, enacted December 30, 2020
116-266	December 30, 2020	(No short title)	To designate the facility of the United States Postal Service located at 909 West Holiday Drive in Fate, Texas, as the "Ralph Hall Post Office".	Pub. L. 116–266 (text) (PDF), S. 3462, 134 Stat. 3320, enacted December 30, 2020
116-267	December 30, 2020	(No short title)	To designate the facility of the United States Postal Service located at 104 East Main Street in Port Washington, Wisconsin, as the "Joseph G. Demler Post Office".	Pub. L. 116–267 (text) (PDF), S. 4126, 134 Stat. 3321, enacted December 30, 2020
116-268	December 30, 2020	(No short title)	To designate the facility of the United States Postal Service located at 440 Arapahoe Street in Thermopolis, Wyoming, as the "Robert L. Brown Post Office".	Pub. L. 116–268 (text) (PDF), S. 4684, 134 Stat. 3322, enacted December 30, 2020
116-269	December 30, 2020	Secret Service Overtime Pay Extension Act	To amend the Overtime Pay for Protective Services Act of 2016 to extend the Secret Service overtime pay exception through 2020, and for other purposes.	Pub. L. 116–269 (text) (PDF), S. 5036, 134 Stat. 3323, enacted December 30, 2020
116-270	December 31, 2020	HBCU Propelling Agency Relationships Towards a New Era of Results for Students Act (HBCU PARTNERS Act)	To strengthen the capacity and competitiveness of historically Black colleges and universities through robust public-sector, private-sector, and community partnerships and engagement, and for other purposes.	Pub. L. 116–270 (text) (PDF), S. 461, 134 Stat. 3325, enacted December 31, 2020
116-271	December 31, 2020	Coordinated Ocean Observations and Research Act of 2020	To reauthorize the Integrated Coastal and Ocean Observation System Act of 2009, to clarify the authority of the Administrator of the National Oceanic and Atmospheric Administration with respect to post-storm assessments, and to require the establishment of a National Water Center, and for other purposes.	Pub. L. 116–271 (text) (PDF), S. 914, 134 Stat. 3331, enacted December 31, 2020
116-272	December 31, 2020	Federal Advance Contracts Enhancement Act (FACE Act)	To amend the Post-Katrina Emergency Management Reform Act of 2006 to incorporate the recommendations made by the Government Accountability Office relating to advance contracts, and for other purposes.	Pub. L. 116–272 (text) (PDF), S. 979, 134 Stat. 3349, enacted December 31, 2020
116-273	December 31, 2020	Scarlett's Sunshine on Sudden Unexpected Death Act	To amend the Public Health Service Act to improve the health of children and help better understand and enhance awareness about unexpected sudden death in early life.	Pub. L. 116–273 (text) (PDF), S. 1130, 134 Stat. 3352, enacted December 31, 2020
116-274	December 31, 2020	Great Lakes Environmental Sensitivity Index Act of 2020	To require the Under Secretary for Oceans and Atmosphere to update periodically the environmental sensitivity index products of the National Oceanic and Atmospheric Administration for each coastal area of the Great Lakes, and for other purposes.	Pub. L. 116–274 (text) (PDF), S. 1342, 134 Stat. 3356, enacted December 31, 2020
116-275	December 31, 2020	One Small Step to Protect Human Heritage in Space Act	To require the National Aeronautics and Space Administration to add recommendations and inform other relevant agencies of information relating to the principle of due regard and the limitation of harmful interference with Apollo landing site artifacts, and for other purposes.	Pub. L. 116–275 (text) (PDF), S. 1694, 134 Stat. 3358, enacted December 31, 2020
116-276	December 31, 2020	Secure Federal Leases from Espionage And Suspicious Entanglements Act (Secrue Federal LEASES Act)	To require the disclosure of ownership of high-security space leased to accommodate a Federal agency, and for other purposes.	Pub. L. 116–276 (text) (PDF), S. 1869, 134 Stat. 3362, enacted December 31, 2020
116-277	December 31, 2020	Missing Persons and Unidentified Remains Act of 2019	To the extent provided in advance in appropriations Act, the Attorney General is authorized to use funds appropriated for the operationalization, maintenance, and expansion of the National Missing and Unidentified Persons System (NamUs) for the purpose of carrying out this Act.	Pub. L. 116–277 (text) (PDF), S. 2174, 134 Stat. 3368, enacted December 31, 2020
116-278	December 31, 2020	Transparency and Effective Accountability Measures for Veteran Caregivers Act (TEAM Veteran Caregivers Act)	To require the Secretary of Veterans Affairs to formally recognize caregivers of veterans, notify veterans and caregivers of clinical determinations relating to eligibility for the family caregiver program, and temporarily extend benefits for veterans who are determined ineligible for the family caregiver program, and for other purposes.	Pub. L. 116–278 (text) (PDF), S. 2216, 134 Stat. 3373, enacted December 31, 2020
116-279	December 31, 2020	Child Care Protection Improvement Act of 2020	To establish a task force to assist States in implementing hiring requirements for child care staff members to improve child safety.	Pub. L. 116–279 (text) (PDF), S. 2683, 134 Stat. 3376, enacted December 31, 2020
116-280	December 31, 2020	Drone Advisory Committee for the 21st Century Act	To establish and ensure an inclusive and transparent Drone Advisory Committee.	Pub. L. 116–280 (text) (PDF), S. 2730, 134 Stat. 3379, enacted December 31, 2020
116-281	December 31, 2020	Crisis Stabilization and Community Reentry Act of 2020	To establish a crisis stabilization and community reentry grant program, and for other purposes.	Pub. L. 116–281 (text) (PDF), S. 3312, 134 Stat. 3381, enacted December 31, 2020
116-282	December 31, 2020	United States Semiquincentennial Commission Amendments Act of 2020	To amend the United States Semiquincentennial Commission Act of 2016 to modify certain membership and other requirements of the United States Semiquincentennial Commission, and for other purposes.	Pub. L. 116–282 (text) (PDF), S. 3989, 134 Stat. 3386, enacted December 31, 2020
116-283	January 1, 2021	William M. (Mac) Thornberry National Defense Authorization Act for Fiscal Year 2021	To authorize appropriations for fiscal year 2021 for military activities of the Department of Defense, for military construction, and for defense activities of the Department of Energy, to prescribe military personnel strengths for such fiscal year, and for other purposes.	Pub. L. 116–283 (text) (PDF), H.R. 6395, 134 Stat. 3388, enacted January 1, 2021
116-284	January 1, 2021	Safeguarding Tomorrow through Ongoing Risk Mitigation Act (STORM Act)	To amend the Robert T. Stafford Disaster Relief and Emergency Assistance Act to allow the Administrator of the Federal Emergency Management Agency to provide capitalization grants to States to establish revolving funds to provide hazard mitigation assistance to reduce risks from disasters and natural hazards, and other related environmental harm.	Pub. L. 116–284 (text) (PDF), S. 3418, 134 Stat. 4869, enacted January 1, 2021
116-285	January 5, 2021	Protecting Families of Fallen Servicemembers Act	To amend the Servicemembers Civil Relief Act to allow certain individuals to terminate contracts for telephone, multichannel video programming, or internet access service, and for other purposes.	Pub. L. 116–285 (text) (PDF), H.R. 4356, 134 Stat. 4878, enacted January 5, 2021
116-286	January 5, 2021	1921 Silver Dollar Coin Anniversary Act	To require the Secretary of the Treasury to honor the 100th anniversary of completion of coinage of the "Morgan Dollar" and the 100th anniversary of commencement of coinage of the "Peace Dollar", and for other purposes.	Pub. L. 116–286 (text) (PDF), H.R. 6192, 134 Stat. 4879, enacted January 5, 2021
116-287	January 5, 2021	Combating Pandemic Scams Act of 2020	To direct the Federal Trade Commission to develop and disseminate information to the public about scams related to COVID-19, and for other purposes.	Pub. L. 116–287 (text) (PDF), H.R. 6435, 134 Stat. 4882, enacted January 5, 2021
116-288	January 5, 2021	Servicemembers and Veterans Initiative Act of 2020	To establish the Servicemembers and Veterans Initiative within the Civil Rights Division of the Department of Justice, and for other purposes.	Pub. L. 116–288 (text) (PDF), H.R. 8354, 134 Stat. 4884, enacted January 5, 2021
116-289	January 5, 2021	Young Fishermen's Development Act	To preserve United States fishing heritage through a national program dedicated to training and assisting the next generation of commercial fishermen, and for other purposes.	Pub. L. 116–289 (text) (PDF), H.R. 1240, 134 Stat. 4886, enacted January 5, 2021
116-290	January 5, 2021	Orange Book Transparency Act of 2020	To amend the Federal Food, Drug, and Cosmetic Act regarding the list under section 505(j)(7) of the Federal Food, Drug, and Cosmetic Act, and for other purposes.	Pub. L. 116–290 (text) (PDF), H.R. 1503, 134 Stat. 4889, enacted January 5, 2021
116-291	January 5, 2021	Henrietta Lacks Enhancing Cancer Research Act of 2019	To direct the Comptroller General of the United States to complete a study on barriers to participation in federally funded cancer clinical trials by populations that have been traditionally underrepresented in such trials.	Pub. L. 116–291 (text) (PDF), H.R. 1966, 134 Stat. 4894, enacted January 5, 2021
116-292	January 5, 2021	School-Based Allergies and Asthma Management Program Act	To amend the Public Health Service Act to increase the preference given, in awarding certain allergies and asthma-related grants, to States that require certain public schools to have allergies and asthma management programs, and for other purposes.	Pub. L. 116–292 (text) (PDF), H.R. 2468, 134 Stat. 4896, enacted January 5, 2021
116-293	January 5, 2021	(No short title)	To designate the facility of the United States Postal Service located at 12711 East Jefferson Avenue in Detroit, Michigan, as the "Aretha Franklin Post Office Building".	Pub. L. 116–293 (text) (PDF), H.R. 3976, 134 Stat. 4898, enacted January 5, 2021
116-294	January 5, 2021	Great Lakes Restoration Initiative Act of 2019	To amend the Federal Water Pollution Control Act to reauthorize the Great Lakes Restoration Initiative, and for other purposes.	Pub. L. 116–294 (text) (PDF), H.R. 4031, 134 Stat. 4899, enacted January 5, 2021
116-295	January 5, 2021	(No short title)	To designate the Department of Veterans Affairs community-based outpatient clinic in Gilbert, Arizona, as the "Staff Sergeant Alexander W. Conrad Veterans Affairs Health Care Clinic".	Pub. L. 116–295 (text) (PDF), H.R. 4983, 134 Stat. 4900, enacted January 5, 2021
116-296	January 5, 2021	(No short title)	To designate the facility of the United States Postal Service located at 14 Walnut Street in Bordentown, New Jersey, as the "Clara Barton Post Office Building".	Pub. L. 116–296 (text) (PDF), H.R. 4988, 134 Stat. 4902, enacted January 5, 2021
116-297	January 5, 2021	(No short title)	To name the Department of Veterans Affairs community-based outpatient clinic in Youngstown, Ohio, as the "Carl Nunziato VA Clinic".	Pub. L. 116–297 (text) (PDF), H.R. 5023, 134 Stat. 4903, enacted January 5, 2021
116-298	January 5, 2021	(No short title)	To designate the facility of the United States Postal Service located at 476 East Main Street in Galesburg, Illinois, as the "Senior Airman Daniel Miller Post Office Building".	Pub. L. 116–298 (text) (PDF), H.R. 5123, 134 Stat. 4905, enacted January 5, 2021
116-299	January 5, 2021	Securing America's Ports Act	To require the Secretary of Homeland Security to develop a plan to increase to 100 percent the rates of scanning of commercial and passenger vehicles and freight rail entering the United States at land ports of entry along the border using large-scale, non-intrusive inspection systems to enhance border security, and for other purposes.	Pub. L. 116–299 (text) (PDF), H.R. 5273, 134 Stat. 4906, enacted January 5, 2021
116-300	January 5, 2021	(No short title)	To designate the facility of the United States Postal Service located at 599 East Genesse Street in Fayetteville, New York, as the "George H. Bacel Post Office Building".	Pub. L. 116–300 (text) (PDF), H.R. 5451, 134 Stat. 4909, enacted January 5, 2021
116-301	January 5, 2021	Rocky Mountain National Park Boundary Modification Act	To modify the boundary of the Rocky Mountain National Park, and for other purposes.	Pub. L. 116–301 (text) (PDF), H.R. 5458, 134 Stat. 4910, enacted January 5, 2021
116-302	January 5, 2021	Rocky Mountain National Park Ownership Correction Act	To authorize the Secretary of the Interior to correct a land ownership error within the boundary of Rocky Mountain National Park, and for other purposes.	Pub. L. 116–302 (text) (PDF), H.R. 5459, 134 Stat. 4912, enacted January 5, 2021
116-303	January 5, 2021	(No short title)	To designate the facility of the United States Postal Service located at 305 Northwest 5th Street in Oklahoma City, Oklahoma, as the "Clara Luper Post Office Building".	Pub. L. 116–303 (text) (PDF), H.R. 5597, 134 Stat. 4914, enacted January 5, 2021
116-304	January 5, 2021	Safeguarding Therapeutics Act	To amend the Federal Food, Drug, and Cosmetic Act to give authority to the Secretary of Health and Human Services, acting through the Commissioner of Food and Drugs, to destroy counterfeit devices.	Pub. L. 116–304 (text) (PDF), H.R. 5663, 134 Stat. 4915, enacted January 5, 2021
116-305	January 5, 2021	Weir Farm National Historical Park Redesignation Act	To redesignate the Weir Farm National Historic Site in the State of Connecticut as the "Weir Farm National Historical Park".	Pub. L. 116–305 (text) (PDF), H.R. 5852, 134 Stat. 4917, enacted January 5, 2021
116-306	January 5, 2021	Mary Ann Shadd Cary Post Office Dedication Act	To designate the facility of the United States Postal Service located at 500 Delaware Avenue, Suite 1, in Wilmington, Delaware, as the "Mary Ann Shadd Cary Post Office".	Pub. L. 116–306 (text) (PDF), H.R. 5972, 134 Stat. 4919, enacted January 5, 2021
116-307	January 5, 2021	(No short title)	To designate the facility of the United States Postal Service located at 4150 Chicago Avenue in Riverside, California, as the "Woodie Rucker-Hughes Post Office Building".	Pub. L. 116–307 (text) (PDF), H.R. 5983, 134 Stat. 4920, enacted January 5, 2021
116-308	January 5, 2021	(No short title)	To designate the facility of the United States Postal Service located at 14955 West Bell Road in Surprise, Arizona, as the "Marc Lee Memorial Post Office Building".	Pub. L. 116–308 (text) (PDF), H.R. 6016, 134 Stat. 4921, enacted January 5, 2021
116-309	January 5, 2021	Strengthening the Opposition to Female Genital Mutilation Act of 2020 (STOP FGM Act of 2020)	To amend title 18, United States Code, to clarify the criminalization of female genital mutilation, and for other purposes.	Pub. L. 116–309 (text) (PDF), H.R. 6100, 134 Stat. 4922, enacted January 5, 2021
116-310	January 5, 2021	(No short title)	To designate the facility of the United States Postal Service located at 1585 Yanceyville Street, Greensboro, North Carolina, as the "J. Howard Coble Post Office Building".	Pub. L. 116–310 (text) (PDF), H.R. 6161, 134 Stat. 4926, enacted January 5, 2021
116-311	January 5, 2021	Proper and Reimbursed Care for Native Veterans Act	To amend the Indian Health Care Improvement Act to clarify the requirement of the Department of Veterans Affairs and the Department of Defense to reimburse the Indian Health Service for certain health care services.	Pub. L. 116–311 (text) (PDF), H.R. 6237, 134 Stat. 4927, enacted January 5, 2021
116-312	January 5, 2021	(No short title)	To designate the facility of the United States Postal Service located at 509 Fairhope Avenue in Fairhope, Alabama, as the "William 'Jack' Jackson Edwards III Post Office Building".	Pub. L. 116–312 (text) (PDF), H.R. 6418, 134 Stat. 4928, enacted January 5, 2021
116-313	January 5, 2021	(No short title)	To deem an urban Indian organization and employees thereof to be a part of the Public Health Service for the purposes of certain claims for personal injury, and for other purposes.	Pub. L. 116–313 (text) (PDF), H.R. 6535, 134 Stat. 4929, enacted January 5, 2021
116-314	January 5, 2021	(No short title)	To designate the facility of the United States Postal Service located at 111 James Street in Reidsville, Georgia, as the "Senator Jack Hill Post Office Building".	Pub. L. 116–314 (text) (PDF), H.R. 7088, 134 Stat. 4931, enacted January 5, 2021
116-315	January 5, 2021	Johnny Isakson and David P. Roe, M.D. Veterans Health Care and Benefits Improvement Act of 2020	To provide flexibility for the Secretary of Veterans Affairs in caring for homeless veterans during a covered public health emergency, to direct the Secretary of Veterans Affairs to carry out a retraining assistance program for unemployed veterans, and for other purposes.	Pub. L. 116–315 (text) (PDF), H.R. 7105, 134 Stat. 4932, enacted January 5, 2021
116-316	January 5, 2021	Patents for Humanity Program Improvement Act	To allow acceleration certificates awarded under the Patents for Humanity Program to be transferable.	Pub. L. 116–316 (text) (PDF), H.R. 7259, 134 Stat. 5065, enacted January 5, 2021
116-317	January 5, 2021	(No short title)	To designate the medical center of the Department of Veterans Affairs in Ann Arbor, Michigan, as the "Lieutenant Colonel Charles S. Kettles Department of Veterans Affairs Medical Center".	Pub. L. 116–317 (text) (PDF), H.R. 7347, 134 Stat. 5066, enacted January 5, 2021
116-318	January 5, 2021	Peace Corps Commemorative Work Extension Act	To extend the authority for the establishment by the Peace Corps Commemorative Foundation of a commemorative work to commemorate the mission of the Peace Corps and the ideals on which the Peace Corps was founded, and for other purposes.	Pub. L. 116–318 (text) (PDF), H.R. 7460, 134 Stat. 5069, enacted January 5, 2021
116-319	January 5, 2021	(No short title)	To designate the facility of the United States Postal Service located at 101 South 16th Street in Clarinda, Iowa, as the "Jessie Field Shambaugh Post Office Building".	Pub. L. 116–319 (text) (PDF), H.R. 7502, 134 Stat. 5070, enacted January 5, 2021
116-320	January 5, 2021	(No short title)	To designate the facility of the United States Postal Service located at 3519 East Walnut Street in Pearland, Texas, as the "Tom Reid Post Office Building".	Pub. L. 116–320 (text) (PDF), H.R. 7810, 134 Stat. 5071, enacted January 5, 2021
116-321	January 5, 2021	(No short title)	To amend the Health Information Technology for Economic and Clinical Health Act to require the Secretary of Health and Human Services to consider certain recognized security practices of covered entities and business associates when making certain determinations, and for other purposes.	Pub. L. 116–321 (text) (PDF), H.R. 7898, 134 Stat. 5072, enacted January 5, 2021
116-322	January 5, 2021	(No short title)	To designate the facility of the United States Postal Service located at 4755 Southeast Dixie Highway in Port Salerno, Florida, as the "Joseph Bullock Post Office Building".	Pub. L. 116–322 (text) (PDF), H.R. 8611, 134 Stat. 5074, enacted January 5, 2021
116-323	January 5, 2021	National Landslide Preparedness Act	To establish a national program to identify and reduce losses from landslide hazards, to establish a national 3D Elevation Program, and for other purposes.	Pub. L. 116–323 (text) (PDF), H.R. 8810, 134 Stat. 5075, enacted January 5, 2021
116-324	January 5, 2021	Lifespan Respite Care Reauthorization Act of 2020	To amend title XXIX of the Public Health Service Act to reauthorize the program under such title relating to lifespan respite care.	Pub. L. 116–324 (text) (PDF), H.R. 8906, 134 Stat. 5085, enacted January 5, 2021
116-325	January 12, 2021	Bankruptcy Administration Improvement Act of 2020	To ensure funding of the United States trustees, extend temporary bankruptcy judgeships, and for other purposes.	Pub. L. 116–325 (text) (PDF), S. 4996, 134 Stat. 5086, enacted January 12, 2021
116-326	January 13, 2021	Special Envoy to Monitor and Combat Anti-Semitism Act	To amend the State Department Basic Authorities Act of 1956 to monitor and combat anti-Semitism globally, and for other purposes.	Pub. L. 116–326 (text) (PDF), H.R. 221, 134 Stat. 5095, enacted January 13, 2021
116-327	January 13, 2021	Competitive Health Insurance Reform Act of 2020	To restore the application of the Federal antitrust laws to the business of health insurance to protect competition and consumers.	Pub. L. 116–327 (text) (PDF), H.R. 1418, 134 Stat. 5097, enacted January 13, 2021
116-328	January 13, 2021	(No short title)	To rename the Homestead National Monument of America near Beatrice, Nebraska, as the "Homestead National Historical Park".	Pub. L. 116–328 (text) (PDF), H.R. 1472, 134 Stat. 5099, enacted January 13, 2021
116-329	January 13, 2021	Yucca House National Monument Expansion Act	To update the map of, and modify the maximum acreage available for inclusion in, the Yucca House National Monument.	Pub. L. 116–329 (text) (PDF), H.R. 1492, 134 Stat. 5100, enacted January 13, 2021
116-330	January 13, 2021	Circulating Collectible Coin Redesign Act of 2020	To amend title 31, United States Code, to require the Secretary of the Treasury to mint and issue certain circulating collectible coins, and for other purposes.	Pub. L. 116–330 (text) (PDF), H.R. 1923, 134 Stat. 5101, enacted January 13, 2021
116-331	January 13, 2021	(No short title)	To designate the Manhattan Campus of the New York Harbor Health Care System of the Department of Veterans Affairs as the "Margaret Cochran Corbin Campus of the New York Harbor Health Care System."	Pub. L. 116–331 (text) (PDF), H.R. 1925, 134 Stat. 5109, enacted January 13, 2021
116-332	January 13, 2021	Eastern European Security Act	To authorize the Secretary of State to make direct loans under section 23 of the Arms Export Control Act, and for other purposes.	Pub. L. 116–332 (text) (PDF), H.R. 2444, 134 Stat. 5111, enacted January 13, 2021
116-333	January 13, 2021	Transparency in Federal Buildings Projects Act of 2019	To amend title 40, United States Code, to require certain prospectuses for public buildings to be made publicly available, and for other purposes.	Pub. L. 116–333 (text) (PDF), H.R. 2502, 134 Stat. 5113, enacted January 13, 2021
116-334	January 13, 2021	USAID Branding Modernization Act	To authorize the Administrator of the United States Agency for International Development to prescribe the manner in which programs of the agency are identified overseas, and for other purposes.	Pub. L. 116–334 (text) (PDF), H.R. 2744, 134 Stat. 5115, enacted January 13, 2021
116-335	January 13, 2021	Expanding Findings for Federal Opioid Research and Treatment Act (EFFORT Act)	To direct the Director of the National Science Foundation to support research on opioid addiction, and for other purposes.	Pub. L. 116–335 (text) (PDF), H.R. 3153, 134 Stat. 5117, enacted January 13, 2021
116-336	January 13, 2021	Julius Rosenwald and the Rosenwald Schools Act of 2020	To require the Secretary of the Interior to conduct a special resource study of the sites associated with the life and legacy of the noted American philanthropist and business executive Julius Rosenwald, with a special focus on the Rosenwald Schools, and for other purposes.	Pub. L. 116–336 (text) (PDF), H.R. 3250, 134 Stat. 5118, enacted January 13, 2021
116-337	January 13, 2021	Protect and Restore America's Estuaries Act	To amend the Federal Water Pollution Control Act to reauthorize the National Estuary Program, and for other purposes.	Pub. L. 116–337 (text) (PDF), H.R. 4044, 134 Stat. 5120, enacted January 13, 2021
116-338	January 13, 2021	Malala Yousafzai Scholarship Act	To expand the number of scholarships available to Pakistani women under the Merit and Needs-Based Scholarship Program.	Pub. L. 116–338 (text) (PDF), H.R. 4508, 134 Stat. 5122, enacted January 13, 2021
116-339	January 13, 2021	Advancing Research to Prevent Suicide Act	To direct the Director of the National Science Foundation to support multidisciplinary research on the science of suicide, and to advance the knowledge and understanding of issues that may be associated with several aspects of suicide including intrinsic and extrinsic factors related to areas such as wellbeing, resilience, and vulnerability.	Pub. L. 116–339 (text) (PDF), H.R. 4704, 134 Stat. 5126, enacted January 13, 2021
116-340	January 13, 2021	Direct Enhancement of Snapper Conservation and the Economy through Novel Devices Act of 2020 (DESCEND Act)	To require individuals fishing for Gulf reef fish to use certain descending devices, and for other purposes.	Pub. L. 116–340 (text) (PDF), H.R. 5126, 134 Stat. 5128, enacted January 13, 2021
116-341	January 13, 2021	Jimmy Carter National Historical Park Redesignation Act	To redesignate the Jimmy Carter National Historic Site as the "Jimmy Carter National Historical Park".	Pub. L. 116–341 (text) (PDF), H.R. 5472, 134 Stat. 5132, enacted January 13, 2021
116-342	January 13, 2021	Building Up Independent Lives and Dreams Act (BUILD Act)	To provide regulatory relief to charitable organizations that provide housing assistance, and for other purposes.	Pub. L. 116–342 (text) (PDF), S. 371, 134 Stat. 5134, enacted January 13, 2021
116-343	January 13, 2021	Organization of American States Legislative Engagement Act of 2020	To strengthen the participation of elected national legislators in the activities of the Organization of American States and reaffirm United States support for Organization of American States human rights and anti-corruption initiatives, and for other purposes.	Pub. L. 116–343 (text) (PDF), S. 1310, 134 Stat. 5136, enacted January 13, 2021
116-344	January 13, 2021	(No short title)	To authorize the Sergeant at Arms and Doorkeeper of the Senate to delegate authority to approve payroll and personnel actions.	Pub. L. 116–344 (text) (PDF), S. 5076, 134 Stat. 5141, enacted January 13, 2021

== Private laws ==
None enacted

== Treaties ratified ==
The following treaties have been ratified in the 116th Congress:

Treaty document number	Date of ratification	Short title	Senate vote
Treaty 113-4	July 16, 2019	The Protocol Amending the Convention between the United States of America and the Kingdom of Spain for the Avoidance of Double Taxation and the Prevention of Fiscal Evasion with Respect to Taxes on Income and its Protocol, signed at Madrid on February 22, 1990	94–2
Treaty 111-8	July 16, 2019	Amending the Convention between the Government of the United States of America and the Government of the Grand Duchy of Luxembourg for the Avoidance of Double Taxation and the Prevention of Fiscal Evasion with Respect to Taxes on Income and Capital, signed on May 20, 2009, at Luxembourg (the "proposed Protocol") and a related agreement effected by the exchange of notes also signed on May 20, 2009	93–3
Treaty 116-1	October 22, 2019	Protocol to the North Atlantic Treaty of 1949 on the Accession of the Republic of North Macedonia	91–2

== See also ==
- List of bills in the 116th United States Congress
- List of United States presidential vetoes#Donald Trump
- List of United States federal legislation
- List of acts of the 115th United States Congress
- Lists of acts of the United States Congress
- 2010s in United States political history
