= New Haven Township, Gallatin County, Illinois =

New Haven Township
- Township
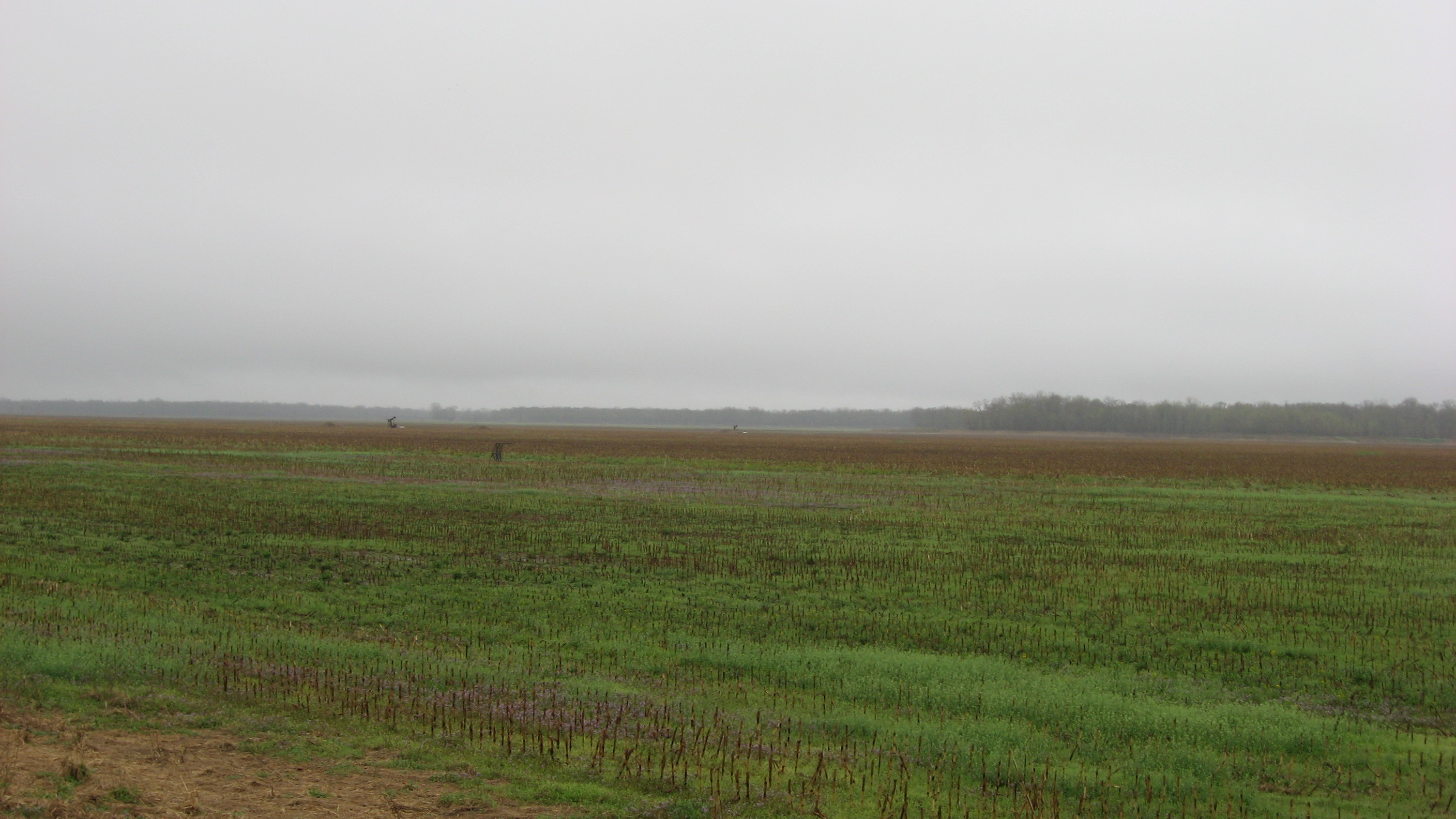
- Fields just south of New Haven

- Location in Gallatin County

- Gallatin County's location in Illinois
- Coordinates: 37°50′36″N 88°05′57″W
- Country: United States
- State: Illinois
- County: Gallatin
- Established: November 5, 1890

Area
  - Total: 45.54 sq mi (117.9 km^{2})
  - Land: 43.69 sq mi (113.2 km^{2})
  - Water: 1.85 sq mi (4.8 km^{2}) 4.06%
- Elevation: 335 ft (102 m)

Population (2020)
  - Total: 446
  - Density: 10.2/sq mi (3.94/km^{2})
- Time zone: UTC-6 (CST)
  - Summer (DST): UTC-5 (CDT)
- ZIP codes: 62867, 62871 62979, 62984
- FIPS code: 17-059-52519

New Haven Township is one of ten townships in Gallatin County, Illinois, USA. As of the 2020 census, its population was 446 and it contained 228 housing units.

== Geography ==
According to the 2021 census gazetteer files, New Haven Township has a total area of 45.54 square miles (117.95 km^{2}), of which 43.69 square miles (113.16 km^{2}) (or 95.94%) is land and 1.85 square miles (4.79 km^{2}) (or 4.06%) is water.

Within the township lies the Duffy site, a Late Woodland Native American archaeological site located southeast of the village of New Haven.

=== Cities, towns, villages ===
- New Haven

=== Major highways ===
- Illinois Route 141

=== Rivers ===
- Little Wabash River
- Ohio River
- Wabash River

=== Lakes ===
- Hulda Lake

== Demographics ==
As of the 2020 census there were 446 people, 199 households, and 114 families residing in the township. The population density was 9.79 inhabitants per square mile (3.78/km^{2}). There were 228 housing units at an average density of 5.01 per square mile (1.93/km^{2}). The racial makeup of the township was 96.64% White, 0.00% African American, 0.00% Native American, 0.67% Asian, 0.00% Pacific Islander, 0.00% from other races, and 2.69% from two or more races. Hispanic or Latino of any race were 0.22% of the population.

There were 199 households, out of which 29.10% had children under the age of 18 living with them, 48.74% were married couples living together, 7.54% had a female householder with no spouse present, and 42.71% were non-families. 27.60% of all households were made up of individuals, and 9.50% had someone living alone who was 65 years of age or older. The average household size was 2.61 and the average family size was 3.36.

The township's age distribution consisted of 15.8% under the age of 18, 20.6% from 18 to 24, 18% from 25 to 44, 32.6% from 45 to 64, and 13.1% who were 65 years of age or older. The median age was 43.6 years. For every 100 females, there were 85.1 males. For every 100 females age 18 and over, there were 83.3 males.

The median income for a household in the township was $44,375, and the median income for a family was $63,000. Males had a median income of $46,602 versus $18,393 for females. The per capita income for the township was $21,289. About 7.9% of families and 21.9% of the population were below the poverty line, including 17.1% of those under age 18 and 16.2% of those age 65 or over.

Historical population
Census	Pop.	Note	%±
2000	527		—
2010	478		−9.3%
2020	446		−6.7%
U.S. Decennial Census

== School districts ==
- Gallatin Community Unit School District 7

== Political districts ==
- Illinois' 15th congressional district
- State House District 118
- State Senate District 59
