= Vietnam Era =

Vietnam Era is a term used by the United States Department of Veterans Affairs (VA) to classify veterans who served during the Vietnam War. Various departments of federal, state and local governments as well as private employers often give Vietnam Era veterans special consideration regarding employment and sometimes assign extra qualifying points.

For VA purposes, in accordance with the Code of Federal Regulations Chapter 38 Paragraph 3.2 (f), the Vietnam Era is "The period beginning on November 1, 1955, and ending on May 7, 1975, inclusive, in the case of a veteran who served in the Republic of Vietnam during that period. The period beginning on August 5, 1964, and ending on May 7, 1975, inclusive, in all other cases." The U.S. Congress, U.S. Department of Defense, and the Department of Veterans Affairs elected to designate those years as such to accord special privileges to all persons who served the country's armed forces during that time. Similar designations have been made for other periods of war.

The date August 5, 1964, is significant because it was the day of the start of U.S. bombing of North Vietnam at the Gulf of Tonkin. Two days later, on August 7, 1964, Congress passed the Gulf of Tonkin Resolution, giving the Johnson Administration significant powers to make war in Vietnam. The Gulf of Tonkin battle is seen as the beginning of the dramatic escalation of U.S. operations in Vietnam. The end of the war is noted as May 7, 1975, because President Gerald R. Ford announced it on that day.
