= Wabash Memorial Bridge =

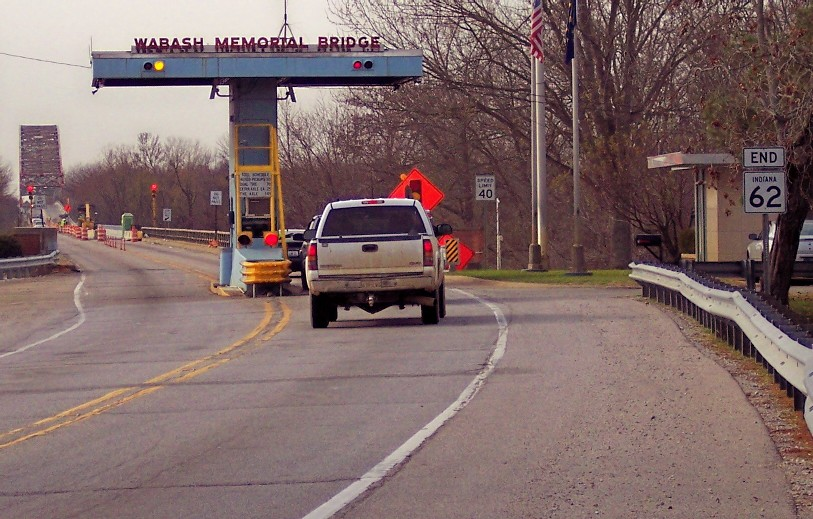
- Former toll booth at the Wabash Memorial Toll Bridge on the Wabash River. The bridge is in the distance
- Coordinates: 37°56′38″N 88°02′10″W
- Carries: 2 lanes of IL 141 / SR 62
- Crosses: Wabash River
- Locale: Near New Haven, Illinois and Mount Vernon, Indiana
- Official name: Wabash Memorial Toll Bridge
- Maintained by: INDOT

Characteristics
- Design: Cantilever Bridge
- Total length: 4,932 feet (1,503 m)

History
- Opened: 1956

Statistics
- Daily traffic: 4,000
- Toll: None

The Wabash Memorial Bridge (Wabash Memorial Toll Bridge in INDOT documents) carries vehicular traffic across the Wabash River between Indiana State Road 62 and Illinois Route 141. The 4,932-foot-long (1,503 m), two-lane bridge is located in both Posey County, Indiana, and White County, Illinois. The bridge is operated by the Indiana Department of Transportation (INDOT). The bridge was built in 1956 and has an estimated life of 75 years. It is the southernmost span connecting Illinois and Indiana, with the next vehicular bridge is located 25 miles north near Griffin on Interstate 64.

Effective January 1, 2011, through June 30, 2014, INDOT adopted an electronic toll collection system for the bridge, with users being required to obtain a transponder in order to legally use the bridge. The automated toll collection system, called Wabash Pass, cost $900,000. Tolls were 50 cents for cars, 30 cents for motorcycles or bicycles, and $1.70 for six-axle trucks. The last toll increase was in 1984. Customers pre-paid their tolls on-line or over the telephone using an e-check, debit card or credit card. Each driver had to have a windshield decal that contained a transponder circuit associated with the driver's account. Over 7,000 of the ISO 18000 6C sticker tag transponders from Federal Signal/Sirit were issued.

Effective July 1, 2014, the State of Indiana discontinued tolls on the Wabash Memorial Bridge. Other than the Indiana Toll Road, it was the last state-owned toll bridge with tolls collected in Indiana. The bridge has an average daily traffic of 4,000 vehicles. The Cannonball Bridge across the Wabash River at St. Francisville, Illinois, a different bridge about 60 miles upstream, continues to collect tolls.

In a $1.67 million resurfacing of the bridge, the contractors used hydrojet demolition instead of jackhammering to remove a layer of the existing concrete surface. As a result, the project was completed in four months. The bridge remained open to one lane of traffic throughout the construction.
