= National Defense Authorization Act for Fiscal Year 2020 =

United States federal law

- Long title: An Act to authorize appropriations for fiscal year 2020 for military activities of the Department of Defense, for military construction, and for defense activities of the Department of Energy, to prescribe military personnel strengths for such fiscal year, and for other purposes.
- Enacted by: the 116th United States Congress

Citations
- Public law: Pub. L. 116–92 (text) (PDF)
- Statutes at Large: 133 Stat. 1198 through 133 Stat. 2316

Legislative history
- Introduced in the Senate as National Defense Authorization Act for Fiscal Year 2020 (S. 1790) by James Inhofe (R–OK) on June 11, 2019; Committee consideration by Senate Armed Services Committee; Passed the Senate on June 27, 2019 (86–8); Passed the House on September 17, 2019; Reported by the joint conference committee on December 9, 2019; agreed to by the House on December 11, 2019 (377–48) and by the Senate on December 17, 2019 (86–8); Signed into law by President Donald Trump on December 20, 2019

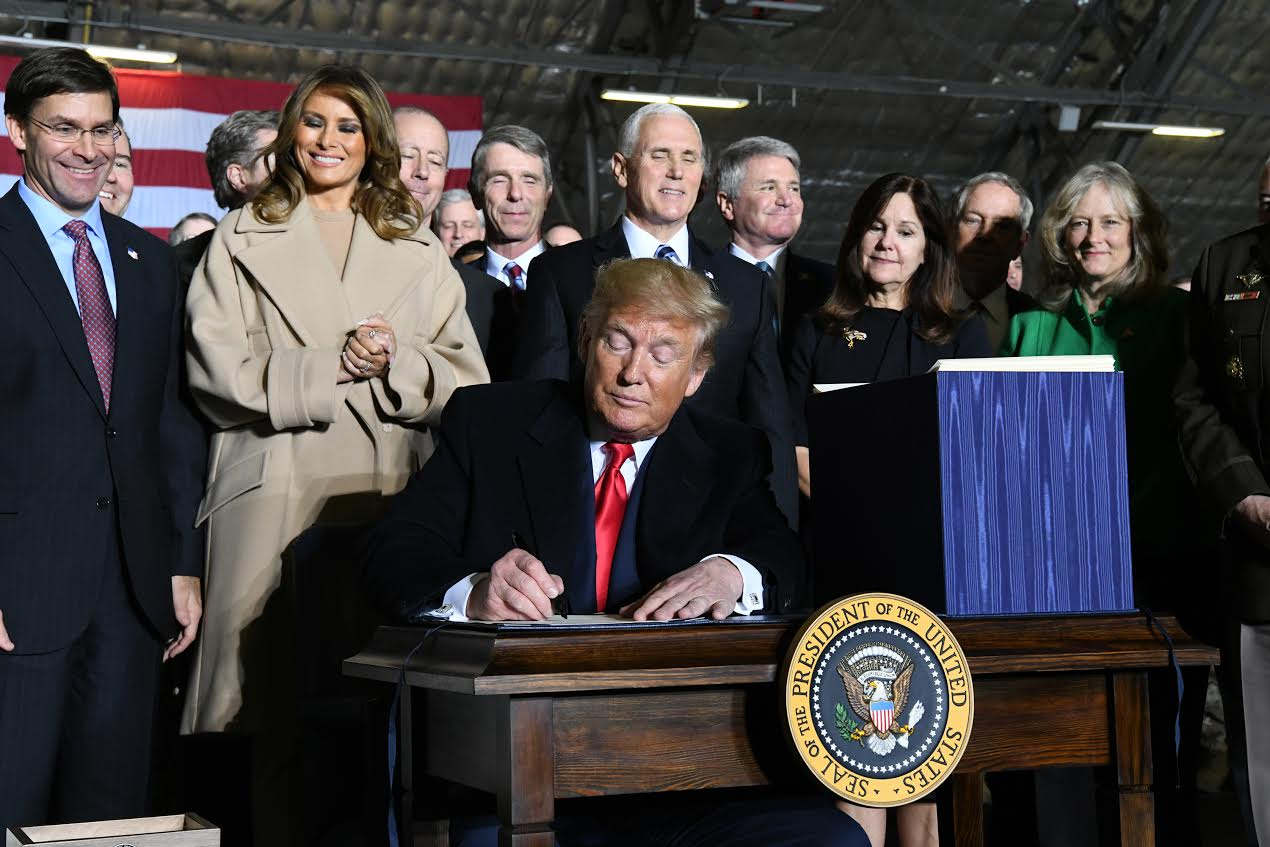
President Donald Trump signs the NDAA 2020.

The National Defense Authorization Act for Fiscal Year 2020 (S. 1790; NDAA 2020, Pub.L. 116-92) is a United States federal law which specifies the budget, expenditures and policies of the U.S. Department of Defense (DOD) for fiscal year 2020. Analogous NDAAs have been passed in previous and subsequent years. The NAA passed the House by a vote of 377–48 and the Senate by a vote of 86–8 and became effective on December 20, 2019, when it was signed into law by President Donald Trump.

The act authorized a $738 billion allocation to the United States military and established the United States Space Force.

== Additional provisions ==
As with many American laws, additional provisions unrelated to defense spending are included within the act.

European businesses involved in Nord Stream 2 natural gas pipeline from Russia to European Union have been sanctioned by the United States, which has been seeking to sell more of its own liquefied natural gas (LNG) to European states, with the enactment of the NDAA 2020 on December 20, 2019. German Finance Minister Olaf Scholz called the sanctions "a severe intervention in German and European internal affairs", and the EU spokesman criticized "the imposition of sanctions against EU companies conducting legitimate business." Russian Foreign Minister Sergey Lavrov also criticized sanctions, saying that U.S. Congress "is literally overwhelmed with the desire to do everything to destroy" the U.S.–Russia relations.

The act includes a provision ordering Acting Director of National Intelligence Joseph Maguire to send the unclassified report identifying those responsible for the 2018 assassination of Jamal Khashoggi to four congressional committees: the United States House Committee on Foreign Affairs, United States House Permanent Select Committee on Intelligence, United States Senate Committee on Foreign Relations, and the United States Senate Select Committee on Intelligence, which had a deadline for the report at 30 days, but Maguire failed to do.

The act established the United States Space Force as a new branch of the United States Armed Forces. The U.S. Space Force is organized as a military service branch within the Department of the Air Force.

The act (Pub. L. 116–92, div. F, title LXXVI, § 7602(a)) amended the Family and Medical Leave Act (FMLA) to grant federal government employees up to 12 weeks of paid time off for the birth, adoption, or foster of a new child. The law applies to births or placements occurring on or after October 1, 2020.

As part of the Arctic policy of the United States, the act mandates the establishment of a new strategic port in the region.

The act barred any merger by the president of the United States Office of Personnel Management into the GSA until the creation and submission of a report by the National Academy of Public Administration.

In April 2017, CIA director Mike Pompeo called WikiLeaks "a non-state hostile intelligence service often abetted by state actors like Russia". The official designation of Wikileaks and Julian Assange as a non-state hostile intelligence service was discussed in mid-2017 during preparation of the Intelligence Authorization Act for Fiscal Year 2018. It was eventually incorporated into the National Defense Authorization Act for Fiscal Year 2020. The act says “It is the sense of Congress that WikiLeaks and the senior leadership of WikiLeaks resemble a non-state hostile intelligence service often abetted by state actors and should be treated as such a service by the United States.” Various sources have stated that the effect of the designation was to allow the CIA to launch and plan operations that didn't require presidential approval or congressional notice.

== See also ==
- Countering America's Adversaries Through Sanctions Act
- Military budget of the United States
- National Defense Authorization Act
