= Rodchenkov Anti-Doping Act of 2019 =

United States federal law

- Long title: An Act to impose criminal sanctions on certain persons involved in international doping fraud conspiracies, to provide restitution for victims of such conspiracies, and to require sharing of information with the United States Anti-Doping Agency to assist its fight against doping, and for other purposes.
- Enacted by: the 116th United States Congress
- Effective: December 4, 2020

Citations
- Public law: Pub. L. 116–206 (text) (PDF)

Legislative history
- Introduced in the House as H.R. 835 by Sheila Jackson Lee (D-TX) on January 29, 2019; Committee consideration by United States House Committee on the Judiciary and United States House Committee on Energy and Commerce; Passed the House on October 22, 2019 (Unanimous voice vote); Passed the Senate on November 16, 2020 (Unanimous consent); Signed into law by President Donald Trump on December 4, 2020

The Rodchenkov Anti-Doping Act of 2019 is a United States federal law that empowers United States officials to prosecute individuals for doping schemes at international sports competitions involving American athletes. Originally introduced in 2019, it was signed into law on December 4, 2020, by President Donald Trump.
