= Illinois Route 141 =

State highway in southeastern Illinois, US

Illinois Route 141
- IL 141 highlighted in red

Route information
- Maintained by IDOT
- Length: 18.17 mi (29.24 km)
- Existed: 1924–present

Major junctions
- West end: US 45 near Norris City; IL 1 in Omaha
- East end: SR 62 near New Haven

Location
- Country: United States
- State: Illinois
- Counties: White, Gallatin

Highway system
- Illinois State Highway System; Interstate; US; State; Tollways; Scenic
← IL 140	→ IL 142

Illinois Route 141 is an east–west state road in southeastern Illinois. It runs from U.S. Route 45 west of Omaha to the Wabash Memorial Bridge over the Wabash River into Indiana. The bridge is also the western terminus of State Road 62. This is a distance of 18.17 miles (29.24 km).

== Route description ==
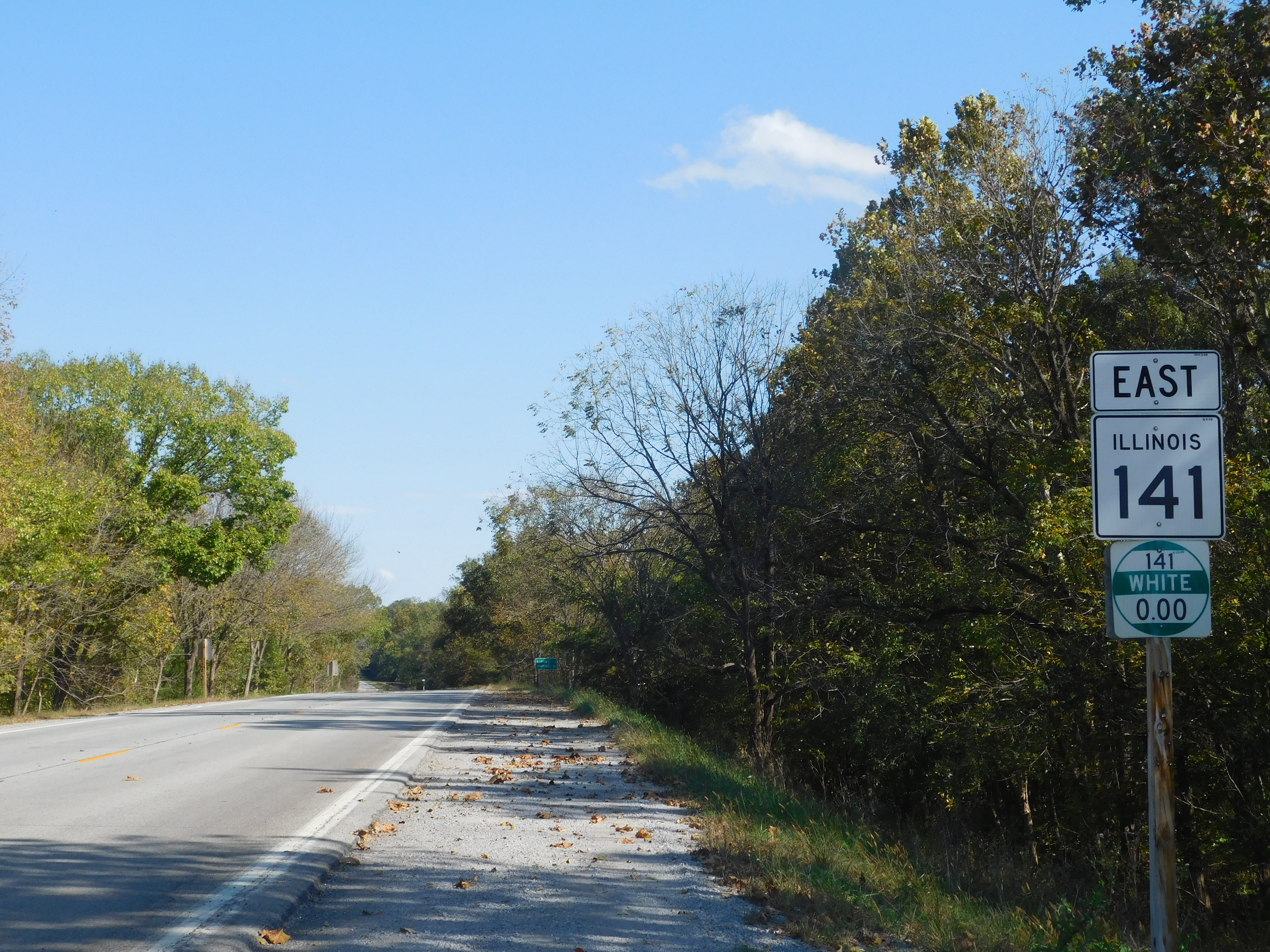
IL 141 heading east from US 45

Illinois 141 serves as a connector between southeastern Illinois and the greater Evansville, Indiana area. It is also the most southerly bridge that is a state highway over the Wabash River; the next crossing into another state is along Illinois Route 13, but that goes over the Ohio River into Kentucky. In addition, Illinois 141 is the most southerly crossing into Indiana.

Illinois 141 runs east from U.S. 45 to Omaha at Illinois 1; the only other area it serves is New Haven.

Illinois 141 is a two-lane surface road for its entire length. Part of Illinois 141 forms the border between White and Gallatin counties.

== History ==
SBI Route 141 originally ran from Norris City (further north on Illinois 1) to New Haven. In 1935, the 141 numbering was dropped from Illinois 1. In 1956, Illinois 141 was extended east to the White County Toll Bridge. The road was completed in 1967 when it was extended west to U.S. 45.

== Major intersections ==
County	Location	mi	km	Destinations	Notes
Gallatin–White county line		0.0	0.0	US 45	
Gallatin–White county line		2.7	4.3	IL 1	
Wabash River		18.1	29.1	Wabash Memorial Bridge	
Posey		18.17	29.24	SR 62 east	Continuation into Indiana
1.000 mi = 1.609 km; 1.000 km = 0.621 mi
