= Duffy site =

Archaeological type site

- Duffy Site
- U.S. National Register of Historic Places
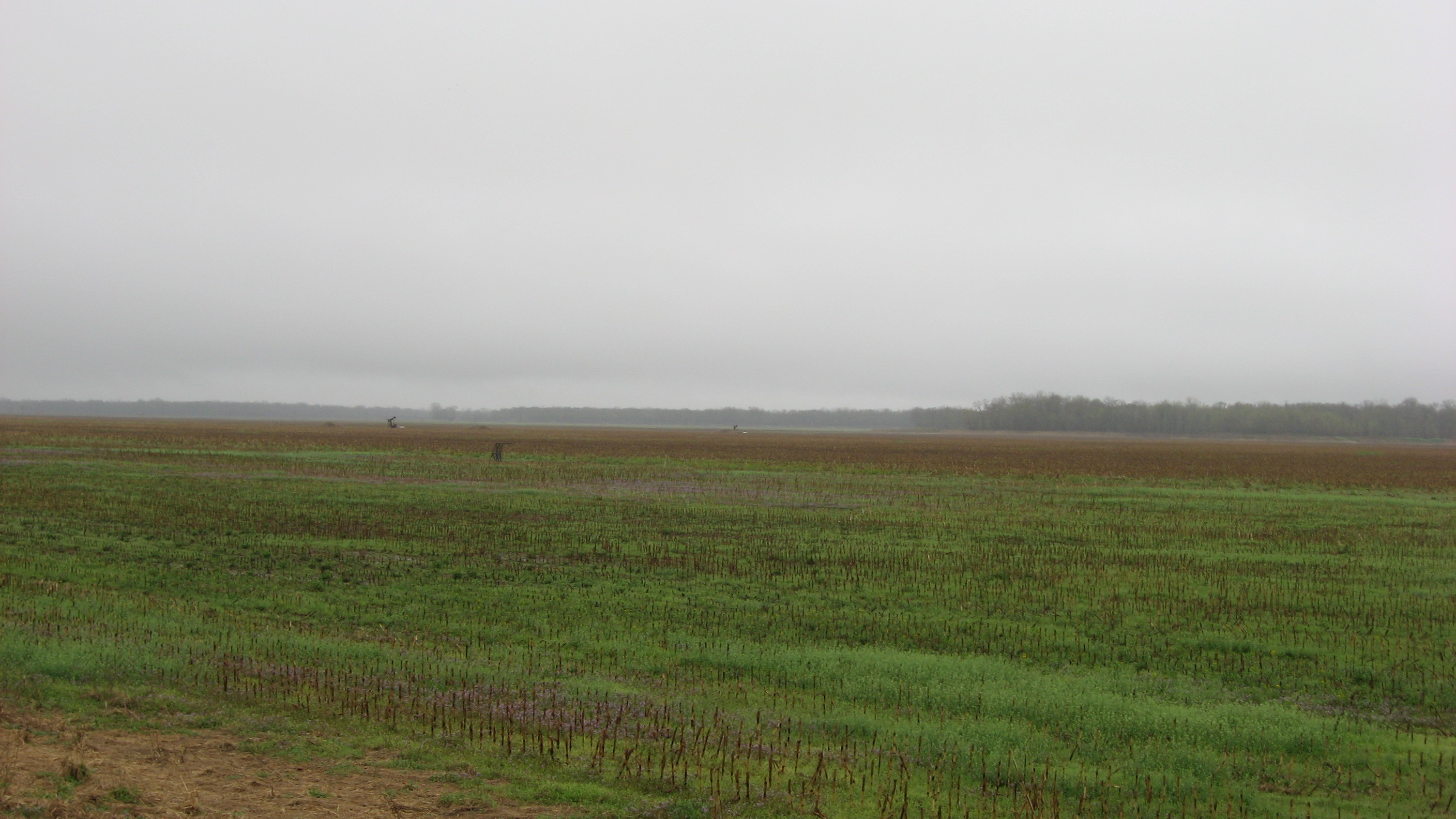
- Overview of the site

- Location within Illinois Location within the United States
- Location: Sally Hardin Rd., southeast of New Haven, Illinois
- Coordinates: 37°51′31″N 88°5′47″W
- Area: 60 acres (24 ha)
- NRHP reference No.: 77000485
- Added to NRHP: August 26, 1977

The Duffy Site is a substantial archaeological site along the Wabash River in the southeastern part of the U.S. state of Illinois. Located near the village of New Haven in Gallatin County, it is the type site for the Duffy Complex, a group of similar sites on the Illinois side of the Wabash near its confluence with the Ohio River. Duffy is distinctive largely because of its pottery: the site's inhabitants typically produced ceramics of various thicknesses and comparatively few decorative elements, tempered with grog. What decorations exist are typically limited to one or two rows of simple lines or bars that have been incised or stamped on the side of the piece of pottery. Projectile points found at the site are small triangular "Mounds Stemless" points, and the inhabitants produced celts of a vaguely rectangular shape. The site is believed to have been inhabited circa AD 1000.

Duffy is clearly related to sites of the Yankeetown Complex, which is named for the Yankeetown site on the Ohio River east of Evansville, Indiana. Like Duffy, the people of Yankeetown produced grog-tempered pottery with few details other than incisions, although differences between Duffy and Yankeetown pottery are substantial enough to rule out a close connection between the two peoples. Nevertheless, the two sites share certain cultural influences: both feature Late Woodland elements, and as Yankeetown appears to show the beginnings of an indigenous form of the Mississippian culture, Duffy bears some evidence of Mississippian influence. Other Illinois sites potentially related to the Duffy Complex include Carrier Mills in Saline County, which shows some Duffy influence, and Gallatin County's Illinois Salines, which has yielded pottery more closely resembling that of Duffy than that of Yankeetown. The latter site appears to have been under Duffy control as the region was transitioning from terminal Late Woodland to Mississippian.

In 1977, the Duffy Site was listed on the National Register of Historic Places, qualifying because of its archaeological importance; it is one of seven Gallatin County locations on the Register, as is the Great Salt Spring.

== See also ==
- List of archaeological sites on the National Register of Historic Places in Illinois
