= Save Our Seas 2.0 Act =

Environmental law in the United States

- Long title: Save Our Seas Act 2.0
- Enacted by: the 116th United States Congress
- Effective: December 18, 2020

Citations
- Public law: Pub. L. 116–224 (text) (PDF)

Legislative history
- Introduced in the United States Senate by Dan Sullivan (R–AK) on June 26, 2019; Committee consideration by Senate - Commerce, Science, and Transportation House - Transportation and Infrastructure; Natural Resources; Foreign Affairs; Energy and Commerce; Science, Space, and Technology; Agriculture; Passed the United States Senate on January 9, 2020; Signed into law by President Donald Trump on December 18, 2020

The Save Our Seas 2.0 Act was a United States federal law signed by United States President Donald Trump in December 2020. It aimed to establish requirements and incentives to prevent marine debris, particularly plastic waste. The law created the Marine Debris Foundation and a 'Genius Prize' to encourage technological innovations that reduce plastic waste. It attempted to raise international awareness of plastic waste and to combat marine debris. The law enforced infrastructure grants to be administered by the United States Environmental Protection Agency.
