= New Haven, Illinois =

- Village
- New Haven
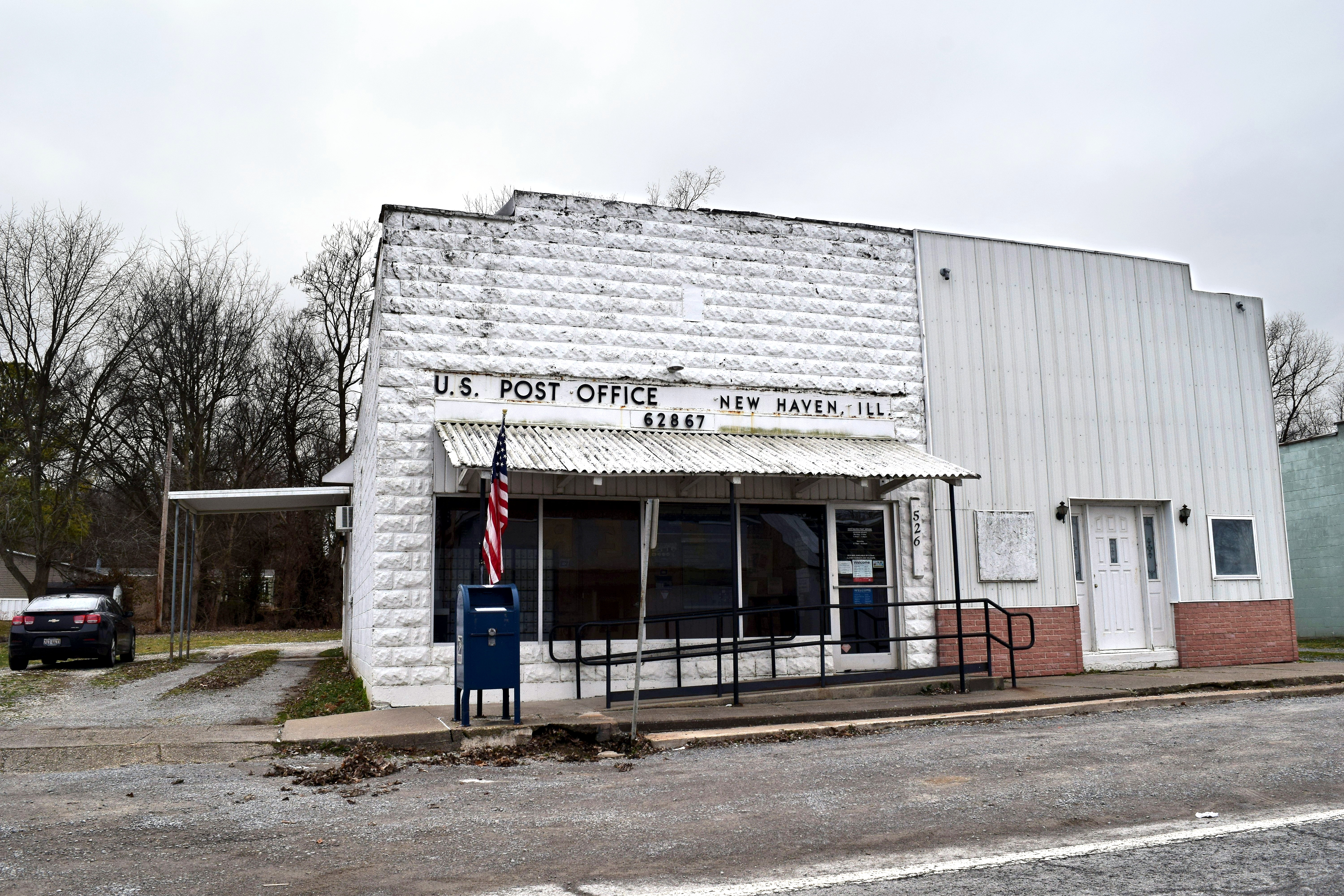
- New Haven post office

- Location of New Haven in Gallatin County, Illinois.
- Coordinates: 37°54′05″N 88°07′28″W
- Country: United States
- State: Illinois
- Counties: Gallatin, White
- Townships: New Haven, Emma

Area
  - Total: 1.27 sq mi (3.30 km^{2})
  - Land: 1.24 sq mi (3.22 km^{2})
  - Water: 0.031 sq mi (0.08 km^{2})
- Elevation: 436 ft (133 m)

Population (2020)
  - Total: 399
  - Density: 321/sq mi (123.8/km^{2})
- Time zone: UTC-6 (CST)
  - Summer (DST): UTC-5 (CDT)
- ZIP code: 62867
- Area code: 618
- FIPS code: 17-52506
- GNIS ID: 2399464

New Haven is a village in Gallatin County, Illinois, United States. It is located adjacent to the Little Wabash River near its mouth with the Wabash River. A small portion of the village is located in Emma Township, White County. The population was 399 at the 2020 United States census.

== History ==
Before the New Haven vicinity was settled, it was inhabited by multiple indigenous cultures. Some countryside southeast of the village near the Wabash was formerly the location of a village of a Late Woodland people known as the "Duffy Complex"; the location is now an archaeological site known as the Duffy site.

== Geography ==
New Haven is located in the northeast corner of Gallatin County. It is bordered to the north by White County, and the Little Wabash River forms part of the northern border. Illinois Route 141 passes through the northern part of the village, leading east 5 miles (8 km) to the Indiana border at the Wabash River and 13 miles (21 km) to Mount Vernon, Indiana, and west 12 miles (19 km) to U.S. Route 45 northwest of Omaha, Illinois. Shawneetown, the Gallatin County seat, is 17 miles (27 km) to the south.

According to the 2021 census gazetteer files, New Haven has a total area of 1.27 square miles (3.29 km^{2}), of which 1.24 square miles (3.21 km^{2}) (or 97.72%) is land and 0.03 square miles (0.08 km^{2}) (or 2.28%) is water.

== Demographics ==
Historical population
Census	Pop.	Note	%±
1860	200		—
1870	356		78.0%
1890	336		—
1900	429		27.7%
1910	514		19.8%
1920	570		10.9%
1930	422		−26.0%
1940	695		64.7%
1950	819		17.8%
1960	642		−21.6%
1970	606		−5.6%
1980	559		−7.8%
1990	459		−17.9%
2000	477		3.9%
2010	433		−9.2%
2020	399		−7.9%
U.S. Decennial Census

As of the 2020 census there were 399 people, 157 households, and 90 families residing in the village. The population density was 313.43 inhabitants per square mile (121.02/km^{2}). There were 204 housing units at an average density of 160.25 per square mile (61.87/km^{2}). The racial makeup of the village was 96.49% White, 0.75% Asian, and 2.76% from two or more races. Hispanic or Latino of any race were 0.50% of the population.

There were 157 households, out of which 21.7% had children under the age of 18 living with them, 46.50% were married couples living together, 9.55% had a female householder with no husband present.

The median income for a household in the village was $34,432, and the median income for a family was $75,417. About 23.9% of the population were below the poverty line, including 27.9% of those under age 18 and 15.9% of those age 65 or over.
