= Title 38 of the Code of Federal Regulations =

U.S. federal rules and regulations on pensions, bonuses, and veterans' relief

CFR Title 38 - Pensions, Bonuses, and Veterans' Relief is one of fifty titles comprising the United States Code of Federal Regulations (CFR). Title 38 is the principal set of rules and regulations issued by federal agencies of the United States regarding pensions, bonuses, and veterans' relief. It is available in digital and printed form, and can be referenced online using the Electronic Code of Federal Regulations (e-CFR).

== Structure ==
The table of contents, as reflected in the e-CFR updated February 28, 2014, is as follows:

Volume	Chapter	Parts	Regulatory Entity
1	I	0-17	Department of Veterans Affairs
2		18-199	Department of Veterans Affairs
	II	200-299	Armed Forces Retirement Home
