= Consumer-driven healthcare =

Type of health insurance plan

Consumer-driven healthcare (CDHC), or consumer-driven health plans (CDHP) refers to a type of health insurance plan that allows employers or employees to utilize pretax money to help pay for medical expenses not covered by their health plan. These plans are linked to health savings accounts (HSAs), health reimbursement accounts (HRAs), or similar medical payment accounts. Users keep any unused balance or "rollover" at the end of the year to increase future balances or to invest for future expenses. They are a high-deductible health plan which has cheaper premiums but higher out of pocket expenses, and as such are seen as a cost effective means for companies to provide health care for their employees.

In this system, health care costs are first paid for by an allotment of money provided by the employer in an HSA or HRA. Once health care costs have used up this amount, the consumer pays for health care until the deductible is reached, after this point, it operates similar to a typical PPO. Once the out-of-pocket maximum is reached, the health plan pays all further costs.

CDHC plans are subject to the provisions of the Affordable Care Act, which mandates that routine or health maintenance claims must be covered, with no cost-sharing (copays, co-insurance, or deductibles) to the patient.

Proponents suggest the plans increase free-market variables in the healthcare system, fostering competition, which, in turn, lowers prices and stimulates improvements in service. Critics argue they cause those less wealthy and educated to avoid needed and appropriate healthcare because of the cost burden.

== Background ==
Consumer-driven healthcare plans had their origin in the U.S. in the late 1990s. It was developed as a business model for health ventures. They were designed to engage consumers more directly in their healthcare purchases. The initial conceptual model made cost and quality information available to the consumer, usually through the Internet.

HSAs are seen by proponents as a way to make healthcare more affordable and accessible in the U.S.

The Medicare Prescription Drug, Improvement, and Modernization Act, which included provisions designed to stimulate the popularity of these plans, was passed by Congress in November 2003 and signed into law by President Bush in December 2003. The law expanded medical savings accounts, renaming them Health Savings Accounts and created tax incentives to encourage adoption of high-deductible health plans. Banks were empowered to create HSAs, which deliver tax-free interest to the holders, who can then withdraw money tax free to pay for qualified expenditures. To qualify for an HSA, the purchaser must also have a qualifying high-deductible health insurance plan. Over time, participants are allowed to contribute more (cumulatively) to the savings account than would be required to fulfill their annual deductible for a given year (although annual limits on pre-tax contributions [other than a 1-time IRA rollover option] are well below the annual deductible), and any unused portions of the account accrue without tax penalty so long as the funds are used only for qualified medical expenses. Further enhancements to HSAs went into effect in 2007. The combination of tax breaks for premiums and the health savings account as well as a tax subsidy to pay for the catastrophic insurance premium of lower income individuals has boosted the popularity of these plans.

By April 2007, some 4.5 million Americans were enrolled in HSAs; more than a fourth of those were previously uninsured. Only people enrolled in high-deducible health plans are eligible for HSAs. Another type of account in the consumer driven healthcare model is Health Reimbursement Arrangements (HRAs), which are employer-funded, and in which employers receive the tax benefits. These accounts are available to people that do not qualify for HSAs.

Other countries with experience in this type of health insurance include China, Taiwan, Singapore and South Africa.

== Popularity ==
By 2007, an estimated 3.8 million U.S. workers, about 5% of the covered workforce, were enrolled in consumer-driven plans. About 10% of firms offered such plans to their workers, according to a study by the Kaiser Family Foundation. In 2010, 13% of consumers in employee-sponsored health insurance programs had consumer-driven health plans. In 2016, 29% of employee were covered by a CDHP.

According to economist John C. Goodman, "In the consumer-driven model, consumers occupy the primary decision-making role regarding the healthcare they receive." Goodman points to a McKinsey study which found that CDHC patients were twice as likely as patients in traditional plans to ask about cost and three times as likely to choose a less expensive treatment option, and chronic patients were 20% more likely to follow treatment regimes carefully.

In 2014, when major portions of the Patient Protection and Affordable Care Act are implemented in the United States, high deductible plans and the concept of consumer-driven healthcare may become more popular. Although new federal tax subsidies will help reduce health insurance rates for many consumers, individuals and families that do not qualify, are expected to consider Health Savings Accounts (HSAs) if they do not have employer-sponsored coverage. .

== Impact ==
Researchers at the Carlson School of Management at the University of Minnesota (Stephen T. Parente), Harvard University (Meredith Rosenthal), University of Illinois at Chicago (Anthony Lo Sasso), and RAND Health Insurance Experiment have examined results of consumer-driven plans. In addition to their own research, health insurers Aetna, Humana and UnitedHealth Group have all provided their own claims data for independent analyses by the Health Care Cost Institute.

The RAND Health Insurance Experiment (1974–1982) is considered "one of the best experimental social science studies ever conducted". In general, most studies, starting with the RAND study, conclude that increasing the costs (co-payments and deductibles) to the patient reduces the consumption of healthcare, but it reduces the consumption of both appropriate and inappropriate care, and the reduction is greater for low-income patients. Joseph Newhouse, in summarizing the RAND study, reported that visits to doctors and hospitals decline with higher cost sharing, "although for low income families such cutbacks reduced their use of beneficial as well as unnecessary services and was estimated to have increased rates of death from preventable illness."

However, proponents counter these findings with studies indicating that CDHCs have broad appeal, provide a new option for the uninsured, and are leading to new incentives for people to be more engaged in managing their health. One study found that the levels and trends of use of preventive and screening services by enrollees in consumer-directed health plans (CDHPs) was similar to that of enrollees in Preferred provider organization (PPO) plans. The authors concluded that "[p]eople enrolled in CDHPs such as those we studied do not underuse preventive services to any greater degree than do those in traditional PPOs."

The Kaiser Family Foundation studied how consumer-driven health plans cover pregnancy. They found wide variations in cost sharing. Pregnant women could face exposure to high out-of-pocket costs under consumer-driven health plans, particularly when complications arise. In one scenario, a complicated pregnancy, with gestational diabetes, pre-term labor, cesarian section and neonatal intensive care, would be priced at $287,000. Under some consumer-directed health plans, the cost to the family would be $6,000, less than some traditional policies. But under other consumer-directed health plans, the cost to the family would be as high as $21,000.

== Consumer satisfaction ==
Results of consumer satisfaction studies regarding consumer-driven health plans have been mixed. While a 2005 survey by the Blue Cross and Blue Shield Association found widespread satisfaction among HSA customers, a survey published in 2007 by employee benefits consultants Towers Perrin came to the opposite conclusion; it found that employees currently enrolled in such plans were significantly less satisfied with many elements of the health benefit plan compared to those enrolled in traditional health benefit plans.

Some policy analysts say that patient satisfaction does not reflect quality of healthcare. Researchers at RAND Corp and the Department of Veterans Affairs asked 236 elderly patients from two managed care plans in 2005 to rate their care, and then examined care in medical records, as reported in Annals of Internal Medicine. No correlation was found. "Patient ratings of healthcare are easy to obtain and report, but do not accurately measure the technical quality of medical care," said John T. Chang, UCLA, the study's lead author.

== Price and quality transparency ==
Healthcare markets are known for a lack of price transparency, which affects the health care prices in the United States. Consumers are unable to make health care decisions based on cost due to a lack of free market, a system in which price transparency is essential. CDHPs cannot effectively decrease health care costs without the ability for consumers to compare prices prior to use.

While cost-estimator tools have become available as part of a broad trend towards consumer-driven health technology in the United States, they often do not use actual negotiated rates and lack quality information. Conversely, some companies such as MyMedicalShopper have attempted to address the problem by sharing negotiated rate estimates along with quality scores.

== See also ==
- Consumers for health care choices
- Flexible spending account
- Health care systems
- Health economics
