= Direct primary care =

Type of American healthcare billing

In the United States, direct primary care (DPC) is a type of primary care billing and payment arrangement made between patients and medical providers, without involving insurance providers. It is an umbrella term, incorporating various delivery systems that involve direct financial relationships between patients and health care providers. Health care providers that are in the direct primary care model, do not belong to insurer or TPA provider networks and contract directly with patients or self-insured employers. DPC practices typically have fewer patients in their panels compared to standard primary care providers with most DPC practices serving 200 to 600 patients per provider. The American Academy of Family Physicians endorsed DPC.

== Structure ==
Direct primary care is promoted to save money on primary care services, as well as other ancillary services such as laboratory testing. Avoiding insurers eliminates the overhead and complexity of those relationships. The objective is to allow competition to drive access to higher quality care at lower prices.

DPC practices charge a monthly membership fee, which is usually between $50 and $100 per month that covers a wide range of services including visits, labs, and in-depth medical consultations and care coordination. DPC differs from concierge medicine, which accepts insurance and charges a premium annual fee that can be paid monthly. Patients that get primary care through a DPC provider have better access to care and more time with their doctor. Physicians in DPC practices are able to provide better standards of care and are not constrained by the administrative load of the fee-for-service, third-party payer billing structure, reporting reduced burnout and higher satisfaction at their practice.

Typically a DPC arrangement is paired with either:

- a high-deductible health plan, as DPC alone does not cover catastrophic care such as most surgeries; or
- a health reimbursement account as the associated tax-benefits can generally be applied to DPC and other medical expenses;

One of the lesser known provisions of the 2010 Patient Protection and Affordable Care Act (ACA) is Section 1301 (and amendment Section 10104). This allows DPC to compete with traditional health insurance options in a health insurance exchange when combined with a low-cost, high-deductible plan.

Onsite health is an emerging model involves the medical practice contracting with self-insured/funded) employers who offer DPC as a means of accessing care for free or reduced office visit fees. The employer pays the membership fees on behalf of the employee.

Another emerging model is partnering with HealthShare plans. Fees are sometimes reduced when participating in both a DPC practice and HealthShare plan. Coverage is more complete and affordable though still lacking certain services depending on both the DPC practice and Healthshare plan.

== Advantages ==
DPC practices do not typically accept insurance payments, thus avoiding the associated overhead and complexity, which can take as much as 10–20 % of each dollar spent. Patients are typically automatically billed, improving provider cash flow.

Rapid access to care can reduce the number of sick days or days of decreased productivity, benefitting the worker and the employer.

DPC may encourage more doctors to provide primary care services or to continue practicing as they age, given the increased income, less-constrained time with each patient, and reduced administrative burden from insurance companies.

The One Big Beautiful Bill Act included the expansion of eligibility for a health savings account or HSA to allow Americans to use their HSA funds towards direct primary care (DPC) membership fees as of January 1, 2026. The limit of DPC membership fees funded through HSA funds are $150 per month per member or $300 per month for more than one member. These limits will be adjusted annually for inflation each tax year after 2026.

== Criticisms ==
Opponents of DPC models assert that DPC is unethical, primarily benefiting providers rather than patients. Proponents claim that using insurance companies as middlemen is unethical, primarily benefitting insurance companies over providers.

ACA requires DPC practices to include a secondary qualifying health plan (QHP) that covers other hospital services that the DPC provider may not offer if they participate in a healthcare exchange. DPC exchange patients are required to carry a catastrophic and hospital services insurance in addition to the DPC arrangement.

DPC plans can be more expensive in the long term, since by design none of the payments made to the DPC provider practice are counted towards insurance deductibles because the provider neither accepts insurance nor participates in the submission and management of the insurance claims process, potentially resulting in a higher out-of-pocket catastrophic or hospital services cost to the patient because deductibles would not necessarily have been reached when these services are provided.

DPC provides a means for physicians to stop participating in the health insurance system, which reduces options for patients with conventional insurance.

== See also ==
- Consumer-driven health care
- Concierge medicine
