= Medical savings account (United States) =

American bank holding limiting deposit use to health expenses

In the United States, a medical savings account (MSA) refers to a medical savings account program, generally associated with self-employed individuals, in which tax-deferred deposits can be made for medical expenses. Withdrawals from the MSA are tax-free if used to pay for qualified medical expenses. The MSA must be coupled with a high-deductible health plan (HDHP). Withdrawals from MSA go toward paying the deductible expenses in a given year. MSA account funds can cover expenses related to most forms of health care, disability, dental care, vision care, and long-term care, whether the expenses were billed through the qualifying insurance or otherwise.

Once the plan deductible is met in a given year, the HDHP will pay any remaining covered medical expenses in that year. If there are funds remaining in the MSA at the end of the year, the funds can either roll over for the following year or can be withdrawn as taxable income.

MSAs are similar to health savings accounts (HSAs), which were established as part of the Medicare Prescription Drug, Improvement, and Modernization Act of 2003.

== History ==
Medical savings was first introduced to the world as an alternative method of national health care financing in Singapore's Medisave scheme as early as the 1980s. (References: WHO 1986 “Singapore’s Family Savings Scheme” by Kai Hong Phua; “Saving for health” World Health Forum, vol. 8, 1987). This was predicated upon the concerns over the rising population ageing rates and current methods of public payment for health either through taxes or insurance since such pay-as-you-go financing systems result in higher annual taxes or premiums. Such systems are unsustainable against rapid population ageing and a future shrinking bases of the young.

Recently, these medical savings are used to pay for health care financing due to the exigencies of emergency spending due to the pandemic, and thus to avoid deficit funding by the government (Reference: COVID-19 poses challenges in healthcare financing, Straits Times, May 27, 2020 ).

The idea of the MSA appears to have come from entrepreneur Stephen Wischweh - he was concerned about the problem of overinsurance. He reasoned that overinsurance was raising the cost of health care expenses. He further reasoned that if patients (as opposed to third-party payers) paid their own medical expenses, then the cost of health care would decrease. Mr. Wischweh contrived this novel approach to consumer-driven healthcare while running an Illinois healthcare brokerage in the late 1980s, American Benefit Consultants. In the early-mid 1990s Stephen implemented his revolutionary healthcare principle through his Florida insurance company, Proweh Health Systems Inc (Clearwater, FL). Stephen Wischweh died in 1998 from cancer, but his ultimate vision of Flex Spending Accounts is now widely used throughout the United States and beyond.

During the early 1990s, think tanks such as the National Center for Policy Analysis and insurance companies such Golden Rule Insurance Company began to promote passage of a law that would allow for tax-free contributions to a medical savings account. Even though the US Congress was under Republican control and the MSA concept was central to the Republican Party's health care agenda, a federal MSA law failed to materialize during the 1990s. However, Congress did pass an MSA pilot as a part of the Health Insurance Portability and Accountability Act (HIPAA) in 1996. In the meantime, some states also pass MSA legislation. Missouri was the first state to do so in 1993. By 1998, 25 states had some form of MSA legislation offering a state tax break to those who open MSAs.

The MSA for the self-employed person or business is now called an 'Archer MSA' by the Internal Revenue Service (IRS). The 'Archer MSA' term refers to the sponsor of the HIPAA amendment creating the accounts in 1996, Congressman Bill Archer of Texas. The Archer MSA is considered an IRS pilot program that must be extended by the US Treasury Department on a periodic basis.

=== Purpose and advantages ===
The Archer MSA is intended to be used by self-employed individuals and small businesses with fewer than 50 employees. The plan is entirely self-directed, including its initial setup and compliance with the plan thresholds.

The plan enables a participant dual to fund a tax-exempt account for medical expenses incurred before an associated 'high deductible' insurance plan begins to cover those expenses. The individual pairs the MSA with a 'catastrophic insurance' plan, which has lower premiums than plans with lower deductibles.

The individual deposits funds in the MSA to cover medical expenses; these deposits are exempt from income tax. Any money added to the account can roll over to another year if unused. MSAs are investment accounts, they can accumulate over the deductible level, can be used for qualified investments, and grow tax free. The MSA account may be convertible into a standard IRA savings plan after a specified age threshold is reached. The amounts contributed for medical savings do not impose a cap on standard IRA contributions.

Among the medical expenses that can be paid out of an MSA account are premiums for long-term care coverage, health care coverage paid while receiving unemployment benefits, or any form of health care continuation coverage required under any federal law.

The risk is that an MSA account holder may find that their medical expenses outstrip the contributions they can afford to make.

=== Sources ===
The MSA is generally a defined trust account that is set up solely as an IRS-related, tax-exempt financial instrument for medical expense purposes. However, after a contributor attains a certain age, current IRS provisions allow this account to be maintained as a standard IRA retirement account.

==== Qualifications ====
There are very specific qualifications to be met before making any contributions and in part those are performed using a worksheet in the IRS Form 8853 instructions. Qualified medical expenses are essentially those that would qualify for the medical and dental expenses deduction. These are discussed in IRS Publication 502. Other personal conditions, such as a period of non-employment as a self-employed individual, allow the payments for the high deductible insurance policy itself to qualify to be paid from the plan.

=== Future of the Archer MSA Program ===
In 2003, the health savings account was created. Since HSAs are a more widely available version of the MSA the original program is by and large obsolete. The exception to this is the state of California where MSA contributions are deductible on a state level and HSA contributions are not.

Since the Archer MSA is a pilot program, it must be extended periodically by the US Treasury Department. The present extension of the program ended December 31, 2007. The US Treasury did not extend the program beyond this point, and as a result no new Archer MSAs may be opened. Current accounts can either be left open as is or converted to an HSA.

At this time there are no financial institutions opening new MSAs. This is because of the creation of the Health Savings Account (HSA) in 2003. The HSA is available to everyone who participates in a qualifying High Deductible Health Plan (HDHP), not just the self-employed or small corporations.

== See also ==
- Flexible spending account
- Health Reimbursement Account
- Health savings account
