= GEHA =

American health insurance company

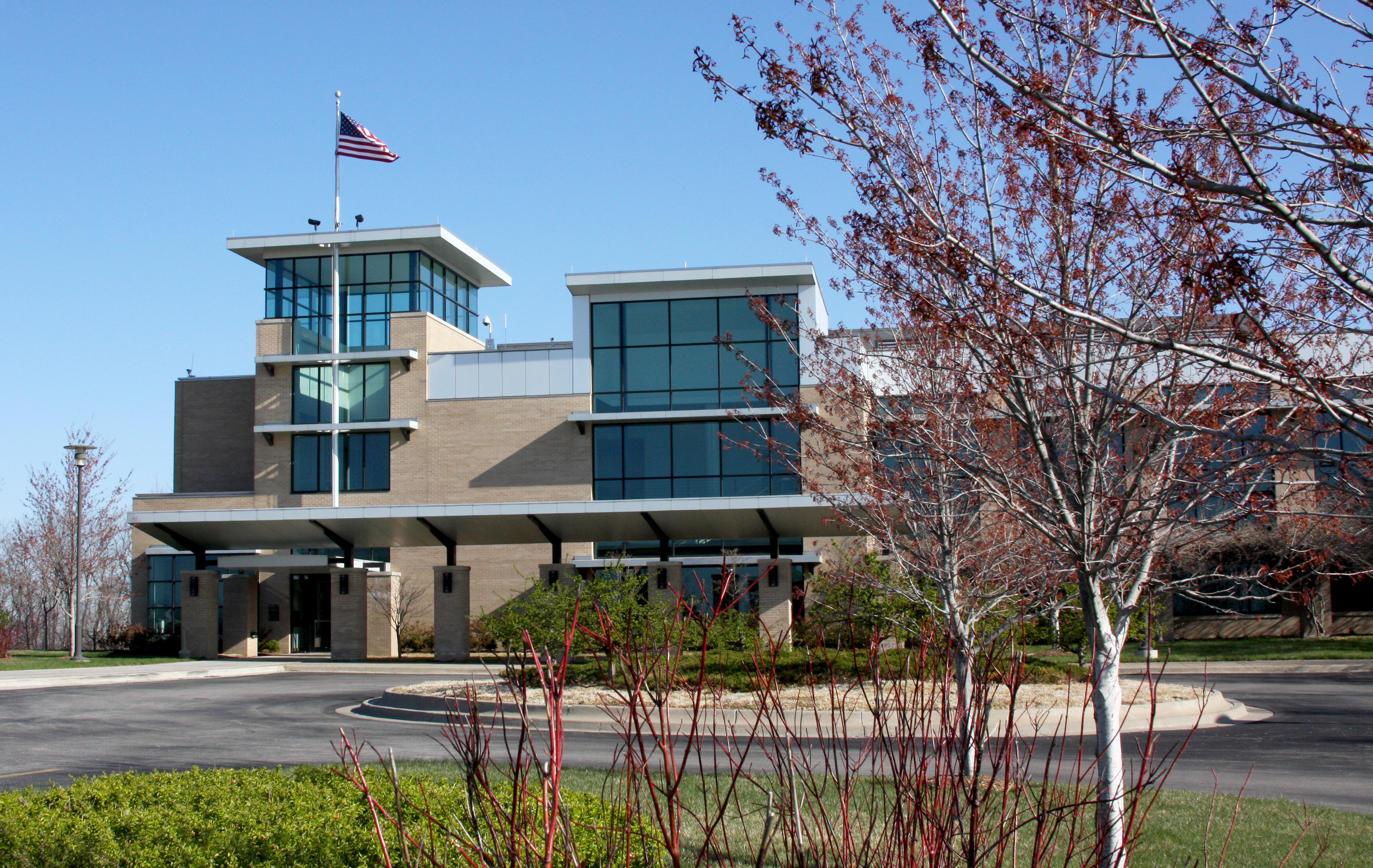
- GEHA headquarters building in Lee's Summit, Missouri
- Type: Private, not-for-profit
- Industry: Health insurance, dental insurance
- Founded: Kansas City, Missouri (1937)
- Founder: Railway Mail clerks
- Headquarters: Lee's Summit, Missouri
- Area served: Worldwide
- Key people: Arthur A Nizza, DSW President and CEO
- Products: Preferred provider organization (PPO), high-deductible health plan (HDHP), Connection Dental
- Revenue: 2,816,502,554 United States dollar (2011)
- Total assets: 1,159,748,620 United States dollar (2011)
- Number of employees: 1,500
- Subsidiaries: GEHA Solutions • Surety Life
- Website: geha.com

GEHA (Government Employees Health Association) is an American self-insured, not-for-profit association providing medical and dental plans to federal employees and retirees and their families through the Federal Employees Health Benefits (FEHB) program and the Federal Employees Dental and Vision Insurance Program (FEDVIP).

GEHA provides benefits to more than 2 million people worldwide.

The company currently offers traditional fee-for-service medical plan options with a preferred provider organization (PPO) along with a high deductible health plan (HDHP) that can be paired with a health savings account (HSA). On the dental side, GEHA offers two options under the Connection Dental Federal FEDVIP plan.

In 2006, the Office of Personnel Management (OPM) chose GEHA as one of a select number of companies to offer supplemental benefits to federal employees under the Federal Employee Dental and Vision Insurance Program (FEDVIP).

GEHA has two subsidiaries: GEHA Solutions and Surety Life. GEHA Solutions, formerly known as PPO USA, was formed in 1997 to market the following products outside federal markets: Connection Dental Network, Connection Vision powered by EyeMed, and Connection Hearing by HearPO. GEHA acquired Surety Life in 2012, giving GEHA flexibility to offer additional products to existing and new customers.

== Company profile ==
=== History ===
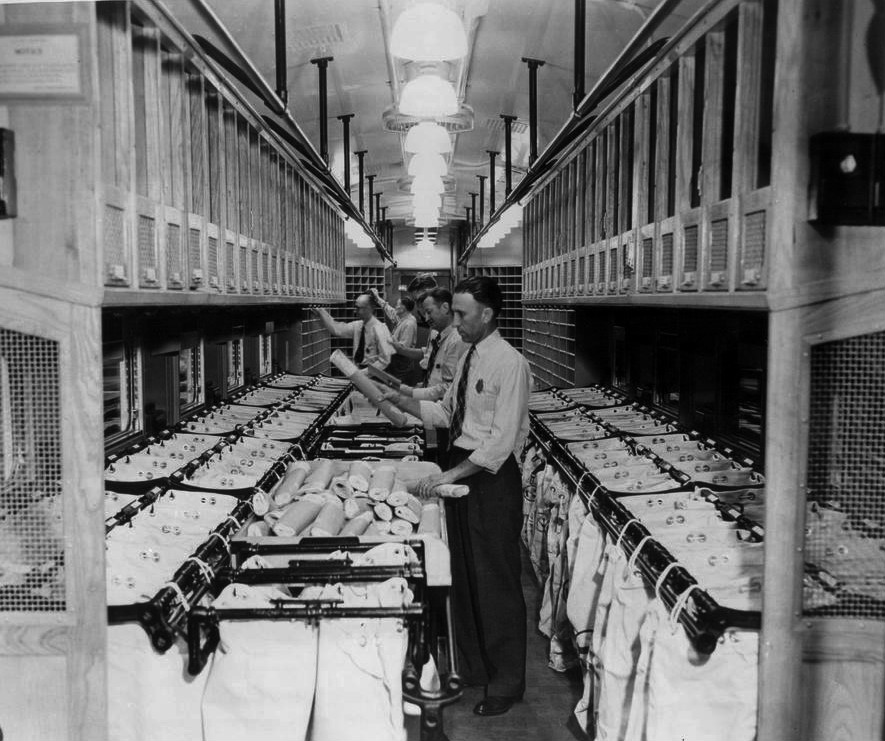
Photo of a Railway Mail Service clerk at work on the Chicago and North Western.

GEHA traces its roots to 1937, when the Railway Mail Hospital Association was formed in Kansas City, Missouri, to help provide U.S. Railway Mail Service clerks with assistance for their medical expenses. Twenty years later, the company expanded its scope to offer health insurance benefits to federal employees and retirees from all agencies and branches of government. In 1964, the company officially became known as the Government Employees Hospital Association. In 2007, the organization changed its name to Government Employees Health Association.

GEHA was one of the first insurance carriers eligible to provide coverage to federal employees under the Federal Employees Health Benefits Act of 1959. The FEHBP contracts with several hundred health insurance plans to provide coverage for more than 8 million federal enrollees and dependents, including retirees.

=== Evolution of the company name ===
The company's name has changed six times since its founding in 1937:

- 1937: Railway Mail Hospital Association
- 1950: Postal Transport Hospital Association
- 1958: Federal Postal Hospital Association
- 1964: Federal Employees Hospital Association
- 1965: Government Employees Hospital Association
- 2007: Government Employees Health Association

== Key people ==
These are the people who have served as GEHA's president over time:

- 1938–1948: Walter C. Tuchfarber
- 1948–1975: Charles L. Massie
- 1975–1988: Raymond E. Rowland
- 1988–1992: James R. Cantrell
- 1993–2015: Richard G. Miles
- 2015–2018: Julie Browne
- 2018–2021: Darren Taylor
- 2021–present: Arthur A. Nizza, DSW

== Sponsorships ==
On March 4, 2021, GEHA and the Kansas City Chiefs of the National Football League announced GEHA had received naming rights to the Chiefs' stadium. It was renamed GEHA Field at Arrowhead Stadium. The sponsorship ended on August 5, 2026, though GEHA remains a partner of the Chiefs.
