= Self-funded health care =

America corporate funded insurance plan

Self-funded health care, also known as Administrative Services Only (ASO), is a self insurance arrangement in the United States whereby an employer provides health or disability benefits to employees using the company's own funds. This is different from fully insured plans where the employer contracts an insurance company to cover the employees and dependents.

In self-funded health care, the employer assumes the direct risk for payment of the claims for benefits. The terms of eligibility and covered benefits are set forth in a plan document which includes provisions similar to those found in a typical group health insurance policy. Unless exempted, such plans create rights and obligations under the Employee Retirement Income Security Act of 1974 ("ERISA").

== Health plans ==
In the United States, a self-funded health plan is generally established by an employer as its own legal entity, similar to a trust. The health plan has its own assets, which, under the Employee Retirement Income Security Act of 1974 (“ERISA”), must be segregated from the employer's general assets. The health plan's assets are derived from pre-tax (in most cases) contributions made by employees, and sometimes additional contributions made by the employer.

The contributions to the health plan's assets are required to be immediately segregated from the employer's general assets. Any claims incurred by plan members in excess of the amount contained within the health plan's pool of assets are the sole responsibility of the employer. The employer, in that case, must deposit its own funds into the health plan's trust account sufficiently to fund any outstanding claims liabilities.

Health plans that cover dependents as well as employees collect contributions for dependents from the employee's payroll deductions. Similar to in traditional insurance, the plan sponsor determines the cost of health coverage and generally requires different payroll deductions depending on whether an employee elects self-only coverage, self plus spouse, self plus spouse plus child(ren), or certain other permutations as determined by the plan sponsor.

Self-funded health care allows some flexibility in structuring a benefit plan; some plans allow fewer options, for example, only a choice between self-only coverage and full family coverage, with two contribution tiers.

=== Designs ===
As health care costs continue to rise, more employers will look to alternative ways to finance their healthcare plans. Consumer-driven plans have become popular recently as employers look to shift some of the accountability to employees. HSAs (health savings accounts) and HRA (health reimbursement accounts) encourage employees to shop around for the best value when considering elective medical procedures or filling pharmacy prescriptions. Self-funded plans take one step further in that they provide all claims data to employers allowing them to set up an EPO (exclusive provider organization) basically a PPO hand-selected by the organization to eliminate high-cost providers.

== Prevalence ==
Historically, self-funding has been most effective for large corporations and Fortune 500 companies with over 1,000 employees, but with the rising cost of healthcare over the past ten years at a rate of close to 10%, self-funding has become an option for smaller employers. It is now estimated that the average self-funded plan covers 300-400 employees and that, of private sector employees that have a workplace health plan, 59% were covered by a plan that is at least in part self-insured.

While some large employers self-administer their self-funded group health plan, most find it necessary to contract with a third party for assistance in claims adjudication and payment. Third party administrators (TPAs) provide these and other services, such as access to preferred provider networks, prescription drug card programs, utilization review, and the stop-loss insurance market. Insurance companies offer similar services under what is frequently described as "administrative services only" or "ASO" contracts. In these arrangements the insurance company provides the typical third party administration services but assume no risk for claims payment.

== Affordable Care Act ==
The Affordable Care Act has had huge ramifications on self-funded health plans. The ACA's market reforms have invalidated many plan designs that were in use. Now that employees are required to have health insurance and many employers are required to offer health benefits as well, the self-funded industry has enlarged.

In the United States, self-funded plans must comply with a number of the provisions in the ACA including dependent coverage until age 26, prohibition on rescission, and prohibition on annual or lifetime limits. However, while the ACA required coverage of essential health benefits for fully insured plans, self-funded plans are notably exempt from this requirement.

== ERISA ==
ERISA is a federal law that sets minimum standards for employee benefit plans, including pension plans and health benefit plans, in private industry within the United States. ERISA neither requires an employer to establish a pension plan, with few exceptions, nor dictates what benefits must be offered; instead, it requires that employers who establish plans meet certain minimum standards. The law is designed for the protection of plan participants, and to ensure a uniform statutory body of law regulating applicable benefit plans, throughout every jurisdiction in the country.

=== Plan sponsor and plan administrator ===
There are two primary entities involved in the formation and administration of a health plan: the plan sponsor and the plan administrator. These terms are defined separately, and the difference is important.

==== Plan sponsor ====
The plan sponsor (also known as the “employer” or “group”) is the entity that sponsors, crafts, offers, maintains, and funds the plan. While the duties of a plan administrator may be delegated to an entity other than the employer, the law invariably requires that the employer be considered the plan sponsor.

==== Plan administrator ====
The plan administrator is the entity charged with general plan administration duties, similar to a trustee in the case of a trust. The plan administrator is always a plan fiduciary; the plan administrator can share the fiduciary duty with other entities, but the plan administrator is required to assume some fiduciary duty and cannot disclaim that duty. In general, the plan administrator is the employer—but new trends in the industry are seeing more and more groups outsourcing plan administrator duties to TPAs or other entities for a fee.

Employers that sponsor self-funded insurance plans often contract with a third-party administrator (TPA), which is an entity that provides ministerial services on behalf of the health plan and the plan sponsor. Traditionally, TPAs do not make discretionary claims determinations; if a determination requires interpretation of the governing plan document, most TPAs do not make it but instead require the plan administrator to provide its own determination. This is because a fiduciary duty is incurred by any entity that exercises discretion over plan assets or in connection with making a binding determination under a health plan. According to ERISA, no matter which entity is identified as a fiduciary within the health plan, any entity will be considered a fiduciary if that entity acts as a fiduciary in a given case. Plan sponsors contract with their chosen TPA by means of an agreement known as an administrative services agreement, which outlines the TPA's duties, generally including administering payment for claims, issuing benefit determinations, and distributing documentation. This agreement generally contains provisions that provide for the TPA's access to the employer's claims funding bank account, and TPAs generally charge on a per-employee-per-month fee.

== Contrast to traditional insurance ==
Traditional insurance is a method for individuals to manage the risk of their health care expenses. Individuals pay a set premium to an insurer, and in turn the insurer agrees to pay that person's eligible healthcare claims. All risk transfers to the insurer; no matter how much is racked up in eligible claims, the insurer bears the risk of paying those claims, and the insured can rest easy knowing that he or she will not be responsible.

In self-funded health care, plan sponsors have broad discretion to determine what terms will be used in the plan, as well as to decide which entities will have the authority to make benefits determinations, factual determinations, appeals determinations, and language interpretations. In traditional insurance, those responsibilities (and risks) are all borne by the insurer.

Part of every insurance premium is allocated to the payment of health claims, and part is allocated to profit for the insurance company. Profit generated by a traditional insurer comes directly from the policyholders, while a self-funded health plan is, or is funded by, a trust.

== Funding ==
Self-funding involves a transfer of risk from the employee and his/her dependants to the employer directly. Self-funded health plans pay health claims out of plan assets; there is no element of traditional insurance on these programs, and the employer assumes all additional liability for claims that have not been paid by plan (trust) assets. Some health plans have no plan assets; known as an unfunded plan, a plan with no assets is funded solely from the general corporate assets of the plan sponsor.

Plan assets can never inure to the benefit of the plan sponsor. Once funds become plan assets—whether through payroll deductions from employees or employer contributions to the plan—those assets invariably belong to the plan.

Level Funded Plans offer a simpler way for small to mid size plans to budget the monthly expenses. This involves the splitting of the estimated aggregate deductible into 12 and paying this monthly. This allows the plan to avoid the cash calls that are associated with larger group plans. This additionally allows the plan owners to have a surplus of unused claims fund dollars if they are not used for plan expenses during the plan year.

== Stop-loss insurance ==
Stop-loss insurance is a form of reinsurance that insures self-funded plans and their assets.

Due to the limited assets at the disposal of an average employer as compared to an insurance company, an employer could easily bankrupt itself if its employees incur a large number of high-dollar claims and the employer is unable to fund them all. This risk is where the concept of stop-loss insurance comes into play, as it provides the employer with an additional source for funding to pay for catastrophic losses. Smaller managed care organizations also may purchase stop-loss insurance to protect themselves from the risk of catastrophic claims loss, but larger insurance companies, such as those that more commonly provide fully insured policies to employers, typically have a large enough pool of assets to be able to assume all of the risk of paying claims. Most employers, however, have a tangibly limited pool of assets.

As employers turn to ERISA preemption as a way to bypass state regulations unfriendly to self-funded health plans, it has become apparent that for many, the only way to achieve this is through the health plan's purchase of stop-loss insurance; however, many states have passed laws that attempt to regulate or limit the issuance of stop-loss insurance to certain groups, either by prohibiting the sale of stop-loss insurance to “small groups” or by setting a statutory minimum attachment point. A 2013 Kaiser Family Foundation study revealed that 59% of self-insured groups’ employees are members of plans that have purchased stop-loss insurance. That number may be a significant underestimate, however, due to groups' being hesitant to admit that they have stop-loss coverage.

In a traditional fully insured health plan, the employer regularly pays a premium, which is a fixed rate for a given time period, and the covered employees pay a monthly contribution to the employer designed to partially offset the employer's premium. In general, the premium does not change except in certain specific instances, such as, most commonly, a change in the number of covered employees. The insurer collects the premiums and pays the health care claims based on the benefits in the health insurance policy that was underwritten and purchased. The employees are responsible to pay any deductibles or co-payments required under the policy.

A self-funded plan has fixed components similar to an insurance premium; but in contrast, the self-funded plan pays the claims incurred by the plan participants, and the employer's risk is not capped. Even with stop-loss insurance, the employer still retains one hundred percent of the risk of claims payments in a purely self-funded scenario. Stop-loss insurance reimbursements are made if the claims costs exceed the catastrophic claims levels in the policy, but if a stop-loss carrier became defunct or simply breached the contract, there would be nothing alleviating the self-funded plan from responsibility for the full amount of claims.

Level funded plans in practice match the aggregate deductible to the aggregate attachment point allowing for easier budgeting. This is the portion that if unused is surplus to the plan owner.

=== State regulation ===
While ERISA preempts some state laws that relate to self-funded employee benefit plans, ERISA does not regulate stop-loss insurance, since stop-loss insurance does not protect employees but instead protects a health plan itself or the employer.

== Benefits and risks ==
One of the main benefits of self-funding is that the group is able to customize the benefits it offers and tailor the plan to its employee base. With this in mind, the sponsor can craft plan provisions to cover certain benefits and exclude others as it sees fit. Less is sometimes more; a plan that covers the services its employees will likely need and excludes the others will have much lower costs. The other principal benefit of these plans is that the data of the plan is owned by the plan and this allows them to make better decisions on pricing and benefits through active management.

As described above, employers that choose to sponsor a self-funded health benefits plan truly do so at their own risk. To be self-funded, the employer necessarily retains one hundred percent of the risk of the payment of the health benefits claims of plan participants. The practical effect of that is that many small groups simply cannot afford to self-fund; a common theory is that groups with too few employees are unable to collect a contribution sufficient to allow the employer to pay health benefits claims without bankrupting itself this is why stoploss insurance is essential to smaller groups. While the practical solution to this is simply to charge a higher and higher contribution as necessary, both the Affordable Care Act and the general business considerations prevent raising the employee's required contribution amount above a certain level.

Another major risk of self-funding is that the obligation to make claims determinations falls upon the Plan Administrator, which is most commonly the employer. While the employer's chosen TPA pays or denies claims when the SPD is clear on how a given claim should be treated, dubious claims are referred to the Plan Administrator for a final decision, because most administrative services agreements specify that the TPA is not permitted to make claims determinations (which protects the TPA and Plan Administrator alike).

Sponsoring a self-funded plan has its risks, but it also has its rewards. While the group may incur unexpectedly catastrophic claims amounts, stop-loss is designed to mitigate those claims.

== Size of self-funded market ==
A recent study has reported that as of 2014, about 81% of workers covered by healthcare through an employer were in a partially or completely self-funded plan, which is up 21% since 1999. According to the Department of Health and Human Services, over 82% of employers with over 500 employees offer a self-funded health plan, and over 25% of firms with between 100 and 499 employees and over 13% of employers with fewer than 100 employees also offer a self-funded health plan.

As is demonstrated by these statistics, self-funded health plans are rooted in the same underlying mathematical principle as insurance in general: Spread of risk. Larger employers have more plan participants over which to spread the risk (loss) and are therefore able to more accurately predict and budget for the cost of the plan. In contrast, an employer with only 50 employees has a small number of participants over which to spread the risk and therefore may experience wide fluctuations in plan costs as the result of covered losses from only a small number of participants. This has given rise to the utilization of surplus from smaller plans on the years that they have not experienced catastrophic claims.

== Non-traditional plan models ==
=== MEWAs ===
A Multiple Employer Welfare Arrangement, or MEWA, is a vehicle through which more than one employer can come together and offer a self-funded plan to employees—a type of co-op. MEWAs are useful for small groups that on their own would not be able to self-fund; for instance, a number of local small businesses, each with a dozen employees, can pool their assets, form a MEWA, and offer a self-funded plan as successfully as one company with the same number of total employees.

ERISA defines a MEWA as:

The term “multiple employer welfare arrangement” means an employee welfare benefit plan, or any other arrangement (other than an employee welfare benefit plan), which is established or maintained for the purpose of offering or providing any [welfare benefit] to the employees of two or more employers (including one or more self-employed individuals), or to their beneficiaries...

The definition goes on to except rural telephone and electric cooperatives and any plan established or maintained pursuant to a collective bargaining agreement.

The benefits included as welfare plan benefits are broadly described and wide-ranging. Virtually any type of health, medical, sickness, or disability benefits will fall into this category, regardless of whether the benefits are offered pursuant to a written instrument or informally, funded or unfunded, offered on a routine or ad hoc basis, or limited to a single employee-participant.

If it is determined that qualifying benefit is being provided, a determination then must be made as to whether the benefit is being provided by a plan “established or maintained by an employer or by an employee organization or by both.” For example, MEWAs provide medical and hospital benefits, but MEWAs generally are not established or maintained by either an employer or employee organization, and, for that reason, do not constitute ERISA-covered plans.

There are certain requirements of a MEWA, and many benefits; MEWAs are governed by state insurance law, rather than ERISA, regardless of whether the MEWA's constituent groups would separately be governed by ERISA if they were to sponsor separate plans.

Section 514(b)(6)(A)(ii) of ERISA provides that in the case of an employee welfare benefit plan that is a MEWA, any law of any state that regulates insurance may apply to the extent not inconsistent with Title I of ERISA. Accordingly, if a MEWA is self-funded rather than fully insured, the only limitation on the applicability of state insurance laws to the MEWA is that the law not be inconsistent with Title I of ERISA.

In general, a state law would be inconsistent with the provisions of Title I to the extent that compliance with such law would abridge an affirmative protection otherwise available to plan participants under Title I or would conflict with any provision of Title I, making compliance with ERISA impossible. For example, any state insurance law that would adversely affect a participant's or beneficiary's right to request or receive documents described in Title I of ERISA, or to pursue claims procedures established in accordance with Section 503 of ERISA, or to obtain and maintain continuation health coverage in accordance with Part 6 of ERISA would be viewed as inconsistent with the provisions of Title I. Similarly, a state insurance law that would require an ERISA-covered plan to make imprudent investments would be inconsistent with the provisions of Title I.

Conversely, a state insurance law generally will not be considered inconsistent with the provisions of Title I if it requires ERISA-covered plans constituting MEWAs to meet more stringent standards of conduct, or to provide more or greater protection to plan participants and beneficiaries than required by ERISA. The United States Department of Labor has expressed the view that any state insurance law that sets standards requiring the maintenance of specified levels of reserves and specified levels of contributions in order for a MEWA to be considered, under such law, able to pay benefits will generally not be considered inconsistent with the provisions of Title I. The Department of Labor also has expressed the view that a state law regulating insurance that requires a license or certificate of authority as a condition precedent or otherwise to transacting insurance business or that subjects persons who fail to comply with such requirements to taxation, fines, and other civil penalties would not in and of itself be considered inconsistent with the provisions of Title I.

=== School trusts ===
School trusts are MEWAs, but some states impose slightly different requirements upon MEWAs established solely by a group of public schools. It is unclear whether some states treat these particular MEWAs differently due to the government funding of the schools or the public interest served, but some states have lowered the enforcement or standards or other requirements for these MEWAs.

=== Captives ===
Rather than a co-op, as each of the previous sections has described, a captive is a subsidiary created to provide benefits to its parent company or companies—although when a captive is offered by more than one employer, the captive is a form of co-op. Captives present risk-management resources for employers who provide self-funded health plans to their respective employees. As is the case with all self-funding arrangements, when a self-funded health plan is offered by a captive, the captive, as opposed to any one particular employer, bears the risk.

In October 2006, the International Association of Insurance Supervisors published an “Issues Paper on the Regulation and Supervision of Captive Insurance Companies.” The Issues Paper defines a captive as:

an insurance or reinsurance entity created and owned, directly or indirectly, by one or more industrial, commercial, or financial entities, the purpose of which is to provide insurance or reinsurance cover for risks of the entity or entities to which it belongs, or for entities connected to those entities, and only a small part, if any, of its risk exposure is related to providing insurance or reinsurance to other parties.

Shock loss is the direct loss that is borne by a self-funding entity; if a self-funding entity has purchased stop-loss, amounts of shock loss that rise above an amount known as the specific deductible are covered by the applicable stop-loss policy. Under the captive model, the parent companies do not themselves offer health plans. Instead, the captive is the only entity offering, sponsoring, and maintaining the self-funded health plan. Accordingly, the captive bears the risk of shock loss.

A captive increases the ability of a group to properly manage risk. Self-funding is simply not an option for some employers; in order to be able to efficiently fund shock losses from the general assets of the Plan Sponsor, members of a group must contribute enough to the Sponsor's general assets, in the aggregate, that the Plan Sponsor is able to pay claims incurred by participants of the plan.

== Stop loss insurance ==
Many employers seek to mitigate the financial risk of self-funding claims under the plan by purchasing stop-loss insurance from an insurance carrier. These policies typically provide for risk retention limitations on both a specific claim and aggregate claims basis. An important aspect of self-funded group health plans lies in the requirement that the employer remain liable for funding of plan claims regardless of the purchase of stop-loss insurance. What this means, in turn, is a fund or company's own bank account creates a pool of their employees and is managed & distributed to claim payouts. In other words, only the employer has a contractual relationship with plan participants and beneficiaries. The stop-loss policy runs solely between the employer and the stop-loss carrier and creates no direct liability to those individuals covered under the plan. This feature provides the critical distinction between fully insured plans (subject to state law insurance regulations) and self-funded health plans, which, under the provisions of Section 514 of ERISA, are exempt from state insurance regulations. Stop-loss policies are instrumental in establishing a "worst-case scenario," or aggregate, for any given year. The aggregate stop-loss helps establish a finite number that can be compared to a plan's guaranteed fully insured cost. If the aggregate cost does not exceed the plans' fully insured guaranteed cost, self-funding may be a viable option. Another way to look at aggregate insurance is as an umbrella policy that caps a company's liability within a specified time period.

== Lawsuits and liability ==
In the United States, self-funded plans regulated under the Employee Retirement Income Security Act of 1974 are notably exempted from insurance bad faith laws. The law has also affected medical malpractice liability.

== See also ==
- Insurance
- Risk management
- Third party administrator
- Health savings account
- List of insurance topics
- Healthcare
- Healthcare in the US
- Health insurance mandates
