= The HSA Coalition =

- Formation: 1991
- Type: non-profit organization
- Headquarters: Washington, D.C.
- Location: United States
- Official language: English
- President: Daniel Perrin
- Website: hsacoalition.org

The HSA Coalition, founded in 1991, is a non-profit organization considered to be "a force behind much of the nation's HSA legislation." The group is an alliance of non-profit organizations that has long supported the creation of the HSA and its predecessor, the Medical Savings Account (MSA). Its mission is to defend Health Savings Accounts against legislative and other attacks, as well as to fix current HSA law to expand the option of choosing an HSA.

== History ==
The Business Coalition for Affordable Health Care, the predecessor to the HSA Coalition, was established in 1991. Then, the Coalition's name changed as the HSA provision was renamed to MSAs, Archer MSAs and then, finally, HSAs. The HSA Coalition is a 501(c)(6) non-profit organization based in Washington, D.C.
