= HealthWell Foundation =

American charitable foundation

- Formation: Tax-exempt since June 2005; 21 years ago
- Type: 501(c)(3)
- Tax ID no.: EIN 200413676
- Headquarters: Germantown, Maryland
- Revenue: 911,501,566 USD (2024)
- Expenses: 603,213,244 USD (2024)
- Website: Official website

The HealthWell Foundation is an American charitable foundation which provides financial assistance to individuals in the form of co-pay and premium assistance.

== History ==
The HealthWell Foundation was founded in 2003 by Stephen M. Weiner. According to the Foundation's website, it has awarded upwards of $5.2 billion in financial assistance to over 1,390,000 patients. The HealthWell Foundation has a four-star rating on Charity Navigator. The Foundation is funded by pharmaceutical companies and private donors.

The Foundation has historically provided assistance with paying copayments and paying for medications and supplements that are not covered by insurance, and operates specific funds for diseases such as lupus, lung cancer, cystic fibrosis, and schizophrenia. A subsidiary of the Foundation was selected to administer the state of New York's cystic fibrosis assistance program for adults.

== Accolades ==
In 2024, Forbes Magazine's 2024 top 100 charity list included the Foundation at number 24.
