= Dad Advice From Bo =

Social media channel

- Born: Bo Petterson; 1958 or 1959 (age 67–68)
- Children: 6

Instagram information
- Page: Dad Advice From Bo
- Years active: 2020–present
- Genre: Self-help
- Followers: 5 million

TikTok information
- Page: DadAdviceFromBo
- Years active: 2020–present
- Genre: Self-help
- Followers: 4.5 million
- Last updated: December 8, 2025
- Website: dadadvicefrombo.com

Dad Advice From Bo is an American social media account featuring instructional videos on everyday tasks, presented by Bo Petterson. The account is active on TikTok and Instagram, and is known for short demonstrations described by viewers as "dad advice".

== History ==
Bo Petterson began the social media account, Dad Advice From Bo, in 2020. The account stemmed from Petterson's daughter, Emily, sustaining a brain injury while playing soccer in her freshman year of college. In 2019, due to her health, Emily was forced to quit a marketing job with the Seattle Seahawks and move back home with her parents. On a suggestion from her therapist while battling depression after her injury, Emily began recording her father doing everyday tasks as a distraction from her struggles amongst her recovery. On the platform, Petterson creates videos explaining how to do various tasks, characterized as "Dad advice". As of November 2025, the account has earned 4.4 million followers and 60 million likes across its content on TikTok.

The income earned from viewerships and sponsorships has funded treatments for Emily, which are experimental in nature, causing the costs to be paid out of pocket. Additionally, the account created a community for Emily, bringing together other brain injury survivors to discuss their individual recoveries and treatment methods. Videos are filmed depending on Emily's health, pausing when she is unable to create them.

In 2026, Petterson was named on Time Magazine's TIME100 Creators list.

== Background ==
Petterson is a father to six children and grandfather of three. He works a full time job in heavy equipment sales and lives on his family's farm in Leavenworth, Washington. Petterson identifies as an introvert, and had to learn to adjust to being recognized as an influencer.

Many of the skills Petterson presents in the videos were taught to him by his father, Einar, who died in 2023.
