= RAND Health Insurance Experiment =

US-based health care study in 1974-1982

The RAND Health Insurance Experiment (RAND HIE) was an experimental study from 1974 to 1982 of health care costs, utilization and outcomes in the United States, which assigned people randomly to different kinds of plans and followed their behavior. Because it was a randomized controlled trial, it provided stronger evidence than the more common observational studies and concluded that cost sharing reduced "inappropriate or unnecessary" medical care (overutilization) but also reduced "appropriate or needed" medical care.

== Methods ==
The RAND HIE was begun in 1971 by a group led by health economist Joseph Newhouse and including health service researchers Robert Brook and John Ware; health economists Willard Manning, Emmett Keeler, Arleen Leibowitz, and Susan Marquis; and statisticians Carl Morris and Naihua Duan. The group set out to answer this question (among others): "Does free medical care lead to better health than insurance plans that require the patient to shoulder part of the cost?"

The team established an insurance company using funding from the United States Department of Health, Education, and Welfare. The company randomly assigned 5809 people to insurance plans that had no cost sharing, 25%, 50% or 95% coinsurance rates with a maximum annual payment of $1000. It also randomly assigned 1,149 persons to a staff model health maintenance organization (HMO), the Group Health Cooperative of Puget Sound. That group faced no cost sharing and was compared with those in the fee-for-service system with no cost sharing as well as an additional 733 members of the Cooperative who were already enrolled in it.

== Findings ==
An early paper with interim results from the RAND HIE concluded that health insurance without coinsurance "leads to more people using services and to more services per user," referring to both outpatient and inpatient services. Subsequent RAND HIE publications "rule[d] out all but a minimal influence, favorable or adverse, of free care for the average participant" but determined that a "low income initially sick group assigned to the HMO . . . [had a] greater risk of dying" than those assigned to fee-for-service (FFS) care. The experiment also demonstrated that cost-sharing reduced "appropriate or needed" medical care as well as "inappropriate or unnecessary" medical care. Studies of specific conditions and diseases in the RAND HIE data found, for example, that the decrease in use of medical services had adverse effects on visual acuity and on blood pressure control. A RAND summary said, "The projected effect was about a 10 percent reduction in mortality for those with hypertension." Newhouse, summarizing the RAND HIE in 2004, wrote, "For most people enrolled in the RAND experiment, who were typical of Americans covered by employment-based insurance, the variation in use across the plans appeared to have minimal to no effects on health status. By contrast, for those who were both poor and sick—people who might be found among those covered by Medicaid or lacking insurance—the reduction in use was harmful, on average."

== Criticisms and legacy ==
The RAND Health Insurance Experiment is considered "one of the best experimental social science studies ever conducted". However, several criticisms of the study have been suggested.

- Some authors questioned the generalizability of comparisons of HMO and FFS care since data on the former were based on a "single, relatively small but well-managed" HMO in Seattle.
- One 2007 article suggested that the "large number of participants who voluntarily dropped out of the costsharing arms of the experiment" could have invalidated the RAND HIE's findings. In response, Newhouse and colleagues described the argument as "implausible".
- The RAND HIE did not study people without health insurance and so could not determine how the presence or absence of health insurance affects health.

Nevertheless, the study opened the way for increased cost sharing for medical care in the 1980s and 1990s.

The RAND HIE is still referenced in the academic literature as a "gold standard" study in research on the effects of health insurance. For example, in 2007 RAND researchers reviewed the literature published between 1985 and 2006 on prescription drug cost sharing, which included co-payments, tiering, coinsurance, pharmacy benefit caps or monthly prescription limits, formulary restrictions, and reference pricing. In summarizing 132 articles, they found that the RAND HIE provided the only relevant experimental data; all other studies they reviewed were observational. They concluded:

Increased cost sharing is associated with lower rates of drug treatment, worse adherence among existing users, and more frequent discontinuation of therapy. For each 10% increase in cost sharing, prescription drug spending decreases by 2% to 6%, depending on class of drug and condition of the patient. The reduction in use associated with a benefit cap, which limits either the coverage amount or the number of covered prescriptions, is consistent with other cost-sharing features. For some chronic conditions, higher cost sharing is associated with increased use of medical services, at least for patients with congestive heart failure, lipid disorders, diabetes, and schizophrenia. While low-income groups may be more sensitive to increased cost sharing, there is little evidence to support this contention.

Furthermore, the RAND HIE is mentioned regularly in the newsmedia:

- "Evidence from the RAND Experiment indicates that most of the expenditure-reducing effects of health-plan deductibles occur at low levels of deductibles."
- "A classic experiment by RAND researchers from 1974 to 1982 found that people who had to pay almost all of their own medical bills spent 30 percent less on health care than those whose insurance covered all their costs, with little or no difference in health outcomes. The one exception was low-income people in poor health, who went without care they needed."
- "The RAND health insurance experiment found that patients cut back equally on both superfluous and necessary visits when asked for small co-payments."

== Oregon Health Study ==
In 2008, for reasons of cost, Oregon's Medicaid agency accepted 10,000 uninsured low-income adults into its insurance program based on a lottery with 89,824 applicants. In the Oregon Health Study, Newhouse and others tracked the effects on those who were accepted and rejected. They found that health insurance improved people's perceptions of health, but people spent more money on health care and their physical health had not improved.

According to economist Katherine Baicker, the study "put to rest two incorrect arguments" related to Medicaid: that Medicaid is not beneficial and that Medicaid coverage saves money.

New data regarding the Oregon experiment shows that while it was effective to reduce out-of-pocket payment by the beneficiaries and increase their financial security, it did not lead to objective improvements in blood sugar, blood pressure, or some other metrics. The findings contradicted the earlier results, which had shown greater effects upon people's health. However, these results are based on two years of data, and longer follow-up might reveal different results. The study did indicate a significant improvement in rates of depression in the two-year window.
