= Federal Employees Health Benefits Program =

U.S. government employee health benefits coverage

The Federal Employees Health Benefits (FEHB) Program is a system of "managed competition" through which employee health benefits are provided to civilian government employees and annuitants of the United States government. The government contributes 63% of the weighted average premium of all plans as of 2025 for single, not to exceed 75%. For spouse plus one, the maximum contribution is $650, often less. For example, BCBC standard biweekly premium is $1,034.14 biweekly, while the government contributes $650, for a 62.86% contribution rate.

The FEHB program allows some insurance companies, employee associations, and labor unions to market health insurance plans to governmental employees. The program is administered by the United States Office of Personnel Management (OPM).

== History ==
The program was created in 1960. Employer sponsorship of health insurance in the United States became prevalent during World War II, as one of the few ways by which employers could escape wage and price control limitations on employee wages. The government originally proposed a system that would revolve around a dominant government-directed plan, but unions and employee associations, which had sponsored their own plans, protested. Reflecting the political pressure thus created, the Congress modified the Executive Branch proposal and all existing plans were "grandfathered" into the program.

== Plans ==
In 2010 about 250 plans participate in the program. About 20 plans are nationwide or almost nationwide, such as the ones offered by some employee unions such as the National Association of Letter Carriers, by some employee associations such as GEHA, and by national insurance companies such as Aetna and the Blue Cross and Blue Shield Association on behalf of its member companies. There are about 230 locally available plans, almost all Health maintenance organizations (HMOs). The FEHBP's cost is about $40 billion in 2010, including both premiums and out-of-pocket costs. About four million employees and annuitants are enrolled, totaling eight million people when dependents are included.

There are three broad types of plans available on the FEHB program: fee-for-service and preferred provider organization (PPO), usually offered in combination; HMOs; and high-deductible health plans and other consumer-driven plans. In the Washington, D.C. metropolitan area, plans open to all federal employees and annuitants include 10 fee-for-service and PPO plans, seven HMOs, and eight high-deductible and consumer-driven plans.

In the FEHB program the federal government sets minimal standards that, if met by an insurance company, allows it to participate in the program. The result is numerous competing insurance plans that are available to federal employees. Local plans have ready access to participation in the program, but the underlying statute prohibits entry of new national plans. Because OPM requires plans to price offerings closely to the health care costs of enrollees, and to offer comprehensive benefits, there is broad similarity in plan offerings. However, total premiums can vary substantially, and in 2010 the lowest cost plan option had a self-only premium cost of about $2,800 and the highest cost plan option for self-only enrollment was about $7,200. As an example of benefit variation, a cap of about $5,000 a year on potential out-of-pocket costs for self-only enrollment is found in a number of plans, but in some plans the cap may reach $15,000 or more (HMOs typically have no cap, but control potential cost exposure by using copayments).

The FEHB program has on several occasions been proposed as a model for national health insurance or a program that could directly enroll the uninsured. In the 2004 presidential campaign, Senator John Kerry proposed opening enrollment in this plan to all Americans. In enacting the Medicare Modernization Act in 2003, the Congress modeled the reformed Medicare Advantage program and the new Medicare Part D Prescription Drug program after the FEHB program.

== See also ==
- Health insurance in the United States
