= Cost sharing =

Costs are shared when more than one party pays towards the total costs, or accounted for separately across a number of activities or projects.

In health care, cost sharing occurs when patients pay for a portion of health care costs not covered by health insurance. The "out-of-pocket" payment varies among healthcare plans and depends on whether or not the patient chooses to use a healthcare provider who is contracted with the healthcare plan's network. Examples of out-of-pocket payments involved in cost sharing include copays, deductibles, and coinsurance.

In accounting, cost sharing or matching means that portion of project or program costs not borne by the funding agency. It includes all contributions, including cash and in-kind, that a recipient makes to an award. If the award is federal, only acceptable non-federal costs qualify as cost sharing and must conform to other necessary and reasonable provisions to accomplish the program objectives. Cost sharing effort is included in the calculation of total committed effort. Effort is defined as the portion of time spent on a particular activity expressed as a percentage of the individual's total activity for the institution. Cost sharing can be audited and must be allowable under cost principles and verifiable to records. Costs may also be divided across activities or projects even if paid for by the same organisation, for example where a charity shares the allocation of its fixed costs between different grants or funding schemes.

A cost-sharing mechanism is a truthful mechanism for deciding what agents should be served by a public project, and how much each of them should pay.

== Sources ==
- Dehez, P., & Tellone, D. (2013). Data games: Sharing public goods with exclusion. Journal of Public Economic Theory, 15(4), 654-673.
