= German Health Care Reform =

Health care reform measures in Germany are designated by the legislature for the organization of the health care system. The main aim of such reforms is to curb the increase of costs in statutory health insurance (for example, by stabilizing the contribution rate and, thus, non-wage labor costs by reducing benefits, increasing co-payments or by changing the remuneration of service providers).
