= GoodRx =

American healthcare company

GoodRx Holdings, Inc.
- Type: Public
- Traded as: Nasdaq: GDRX (Class A)
- Founded: 2011; 15 years ago
- Founders: Trevor Bezdek; Doug Hirsch; Scott Marlette
- Headquarters: Santa Monica, California, United States
- Number of locations: 2 (2019)
- Area served: United States
- Key people: Wendy Barnes (President and CEO)
- Services: Prescription drug price comparison website; Drug discount programs; Telemedicine
- Revenue: ▲US$797 million (2025)
- Net income: ▲US$30.4 million (2025)
- Number of employees: 738 (2024)
- Website: goodrx.com

GoodRx Holdings, Inc. is an American healthcare company that operates a telemedicine platform and free-to-use website and mobile app that track prescription drug prices in the United States and provide drug coupons for discounts on medications. GoodRx compares prescription drug prices at more than 75,000 pharmacies in the United States. The platform allows users to consult a doctor online and obtain a prescription for certain types of medications.

== History ==
=== Financial performance ===
GoodRx was founded in Santa Monica, California in 2011. GoodRx experienced substantial growth in net income in 2017 ($9 million), 2018 ($44 million), and 2019 ($66 million), but recorded a loss of $293.6 million in 2020 due to IPO-related expenses.

In September 2020, GoodRx went public on the Nasdaq under the ticker symbol GDRX. The company priced its initial public offering at $33 per share, above the expected range of $24 to $28, raising more than $1.1 billion at an initial valuation of approximately $12.7 billion. In the first half of 2020, the company reported revenues of $257 million and net income of $55 million.

GoodRx generated $745.4 million in revenue for the full year 2021, a 35.36% increase over 2020. During the first half of 2021, the company's share price declined by 10.7%. The decline was attributed to increased competition in online pharmacy services and slower user growth.

GoodRx reported full-year revenue of $766.6 million, with adjusted EBITDA reaching $213.5 million, exceeding guidance in the fourth quarter. GoodRx reported that 41% of prescriptions filled using its coupons were newly adherent, meaning they would not have been filled without the service.

GoodRx reported a full-year 2023 revenue of $750.3 million, a decrease of 2.1% from 2022. However, its fourth-quarter revenue increased by 7% year-over-year. GoodRx achieved an Adjusted EBITDA of $217.4 million for the year and an Adjusted EBITDA Margin of 28.6%.

In 2024, GoodRx achieved 6% revenue growth with $792.3 million for the full year and turned a net loss into a positive net income of $16.4 million. The company also demonstrated strong operational efficiency, with a 32.8% increase in full-year Adjusted EBITDA.

In Q2 2025, GoodRx reported revenue of $203.1 million, a 1.2% increase from the previous year, and a net income of $12.8 million, a significant 92% jump, which resulted in a 6.3% net income margin. However, prescription transaction revenue declined by 3% due to a decrease in monthly active consumers, but this was offset by strong 32% growth in its Pharma Manufacturer Solutions business. GoodRx also saw a 7% decrease in subscription revenue.

=== Mergers and acquisitions ===
In 2019, GoodRx acquired HeyDoctor, a telemedicine company, to integrate virtual healthcare services into the platform.

In 2021, a health video content producer, HealthiNation was acquired by GoodRx, which helped provide consumers with health information and offered pharmaceutical manufacturers new ways to reach relevant audiences.

In April 2022, GoodRx acquired VitaCare Prescription Services from TherapeuticsMD to strengthen its pharma manufacturer solutions business.

=== Partnerships ===
In 2017, the company announced partnerships with major pharmaceutical companies to negotiate lowering prescription drug costs.

GoodRx has deep relationships with major pharmacy chains, including Walgreens, Walmart, CVS Caremark, and Publix, to allow customers to use GoodRx discounts and Gold benefits. GoodRx began its partnership with CVS Caremark in July 2023 to automatically apply coupons to insured CVS customers purchasing generic prescriptions at certain locations. In April 2024, GoodRx added Publix into its network, allowing GoodRx Gold members to use their cards at Publix Pharmacies.

GoodRx partners with Pharmacy Benefit Management like Caremark, Express Scripts, and MedImpact to apply their savings directly to eligible insurance plans and members.

GoodRx partners with companies like Affirm, Benefitfocus, and DoorDash to integrate their services that offer members discounts and financial flexibility for prescriptions.

GoodRx also partners with organizations like the American Academy of Family Physicians Foundation to support broader access to care.

In October 2022, GoodRx launched Provider Mode, which allows healthcare providers to use the app to compare costs of drugs for patients based on different payment methods and drug alternatives.

In 2025, GoodRx partnered with Novo Nordisk to offer discounted cash-pay access to semaglutide products like Ozempic and Wegovy through its platform and participating pharmacies.

== Products and services ==
GoodRx started its telemedicine service GoodRx Care in September 2019. It lets people talk to a licensed provider online for common issues and get prescriptions even if they don't have insurance.

They also run condition-specific subscription plans that bundle online doctor visits, FDA-approved meds, and home delivery into one monthly payment.

On the weight management side, GoodRx offers prescriptions for GLP-1 drugs like semaglutide through their telemedicine platform. This got a boost when the oral version of Wegovy became widely available in the US in early 2026.

GoodRx works with drug makers like Novo Nordisk to make some medications (including semaglutide options) more affordable for people paying cash.

The telemedicine part took off after GoodRx bought HeyDoctor in 2019 and brought their virtual care tools into the main platform.

== Key people ==
The Santa Monica-based startup was founded in September 2011 by Trevor Bezdek and former Facebook executives Doug Hirsch and Scott Marlette. Marlette was one of the first 20 employees at Facebook and built Facebook's photo application. In 2005, Hirsch was the Vice President of Product at Facebook, working closely with Mark Zuckerberg.

Bezdek and Hirsch served as co-chief executive officers until April 2023, when they stepped down from those roles and technology executive Scott Wagner was appointed interim chief executive officer. Bezdek became chair of the board, while Hirsch took on the role of chief mission officer.

In December 2024, GoodRx announced that healthcare executive Wendy Barnes would become president and chief executive officer effective January 1, 2025. As of 2025, Barnes serves as the company's CEO, while Trevor Bezdek and Scott Wagner serve as co-chairs of the board, and Doug Hirsch remains involved as a co-founder and senior executive.

== Controversy ==
On February 25, 2020, Consumer Reports published an article stating that GoodRx shared user data—specifically, pseudonymized advertising ID numbers that companies use to track the behavior of web users across websites, the names of the drugs that users browsed, and the pharmacies where users sought to fill prescriptions—with Google, Facebook, and around twenty other Internet-based companies. A few days later, GoodRx released a statement saying that it had made changes to prevent user search data on medical conditions and pharmaceuticals from being shared with Facebook.

In March 2020, GoodRx stopped sending data about user prescriptions to Facebook.

On February 1, 2023, the Federal Trade Commission fined GoodRx US$1.5 million for violations of the Breach Notification Rule and the Federal Trade Commission Act for allegedly failing to obtain specific, informed, and unambiguous consent from users before disclosing health-related information to Facebook and Google.

In November 2024, independent pharmacies filed at least three class action lawsuits against GoodRx and major pharmacy benefit managers. The cases, brought by independent pharmacies in California, Michigan, Pennsylvania, and Rhode Island, allege that GoodRx and the PBMs collaborated to suppress reimbursements for generic prescription drugs. They allege that agreements using GoodRx's software suppressed reimbursements for generic drugs and violated the Sherman Antitrust Act. The suits claim the practices amount to price fixing which harms small pharmacies while benefiting PBMs and their affiliates.

GoodRx settled both the 2023 FTC action and the 2025 class action lawsuit without admitting wrongdoing.

== See also ==
- Health care finance in the United States
- TrumpRx – a federal government website to find prescription drug prices and discounted cash prices
