= Lives at Risk =

Book by John C. Goodman

Lives at Risk: Single-Payer National Health Insurance Around the World
- Author: John C. Goodman, Gerald L. Musgrave, Devon M. Herrick
- Language: English
- Genre: Health Care Economics
- Publisher: Rowman & Littlefield Publishers, Inc.
- Publication date: August 28, 2004
- Publication place: United States
- Pages: 727
- ISBN: 978-0-7425-4152-8
- OCLC: 54817209
- Dewey Decimal: 368.4/2 22
- LC Class: RA412 .G66 2004
- Preceded by: Patient Power

Lives at Risk is a book about modern health care systems, written by John C. Goodman, Gerald L. Musgrave, and Devon M. Herrick, and released in 2004. It examines the flaws of current health care systems and proposes reforms for the health care system in the United States. In doing so it examines 20 common assumptions about government involvement in health care systems which the authors argue are myths. The book continues on to discuss the economics and politics behind health care in the United States, and proposes market based reforms.
