= Co-insurance =

Splitting of financial risk among parties

In insurance, co-insurance or coinsurance is the splitting or spreading of risk among multiple parties.

== In the United States ==
In the U.S. insurance market, co-insurance is the joint assumption of risk between the insurer and the insured. In title insurance, it also means the sharing of risks between two or more title insurance companies.

=== In health insurance ===
In health insurance, copayment is fixed while co-insurance is the percentage that the insured pays after the insurance policy's deductible is exceeded, up to the policy's stop loss. It can be expressed as a pair of percentages with the insurer's portion stated first, or just a single percentage showing what the insured pays. Once the insured's out-of-pocket expenses equal the stop loss, the insurer will assume responsibility for 100% of any additional costs. 70–30, 80–20, and 90–10 insurer-insured co-insurance schemes are common, with stop loss limits of $1,000 to $3,000 after which the insurer covers all expenses.

=== In property insurance ===
Co-insurance is a penalty imposed on the insured by the insurance carrier for underinsuring the value of the tangible property. The penalty is based on a percentage stated within the policy and the amount underreported.

=== In title insurance ===
Owner's title insurance policy forms of the American Land Title Association created between 1987 and late 2006, contain co-insurance clauses. For partial losses, they require the insured carry a percentage of the risk of loss in two circumstances. The first is if the insured did not insure its title for at least 80% of its market value at the time the policy was issued. In that case, the insurer will pay only 80% of the loss. The second is if improvements constructed on the property after the policy is issued increase the property's value by at least 20% above the amount of the policy. In that case, the insurer will pay a percentage of the claim equal to the ratio of 120% of the amount of insurance purchased divided by the sum of the amount of insurance and the cost of the improvements.

Co-insurance is also used among U.S. domestic title insurers in a manner similar to that described below for the international insurance market.

=== In other insurance ===
In some cases, including employer's liability insurance, co-insurance percent denotes a function analogous to the copay function that it has in health insurance, in which the insured covers a certain percentage of the losses up to a certain level.

In business income interruption insurance, a type of time-element insurance, the co-insurance percent indicates how long the coverage will last, and can range from 50% to 125%. The former co-insurance allows for 6 months of coverage, compared to 15 months for 125%.

== See also ==
- Cost sharing
