= Emmett Keeler =

American mathematician (born 1941)

- Born: Emmett Brown Keeler; September 28, 1941 (age 84)
- Education: Harvard University
- Scientific career
- Fields: Health economics Mathematics
- Institutions: Pardee RAND Graduate School; RAND Corporation
- Thesis: Mathematical Models of Economic Growth (1969)
- Doctoral advisor: Garrett Birkhoff

Emmett Brown Keeler (born September 28, 1941) is an American mathematician who works as a senior mathematician at the RAND Corporation. He is also a professor at the UCLA Fielding School of Public Health and at the Pardee RAND Graduate School. An elected member of the National Academy of Medicine, he is known for his work on the RAND Health Insurance Experiment.
