= John C. Goodman =

Health care economist (born 1946)

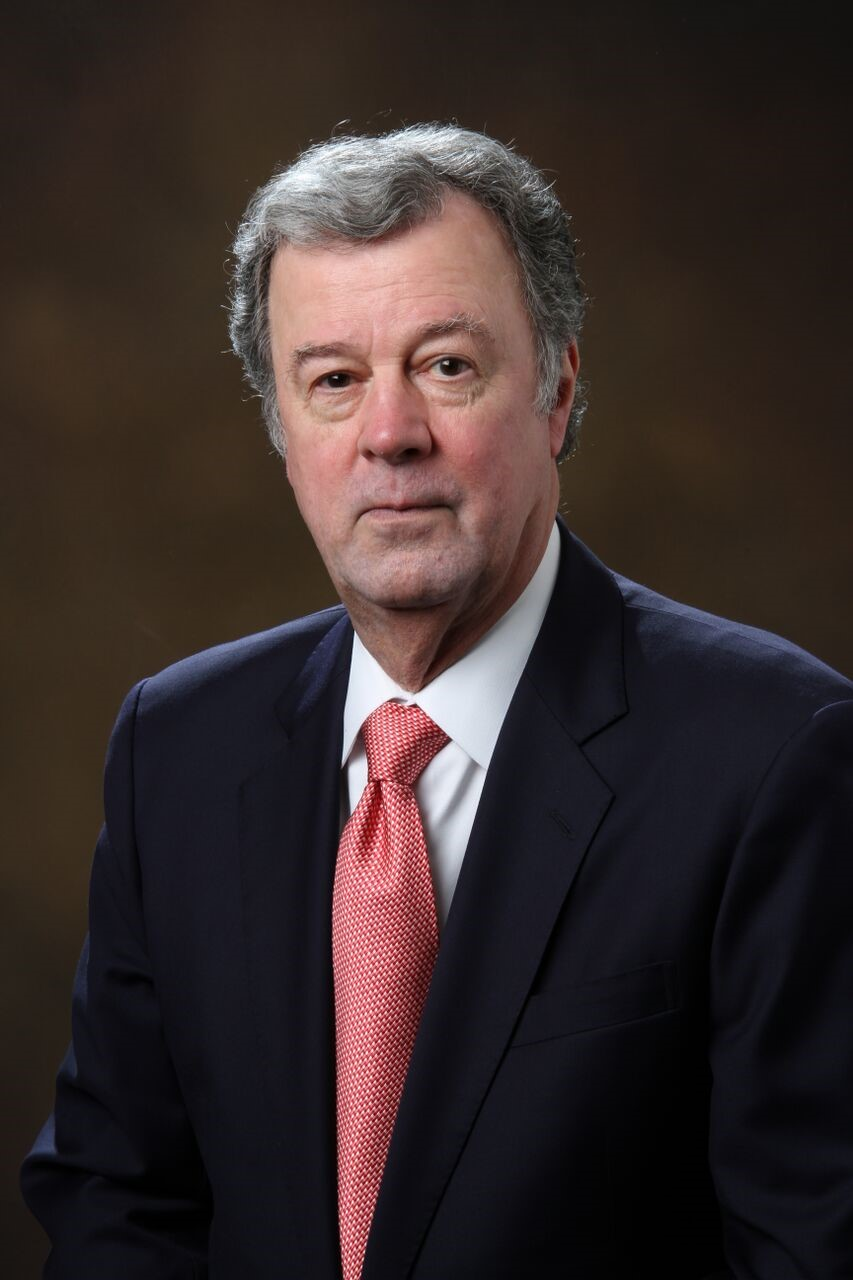
- Goodman in 2015
- Born: 22 May 1946 (age 80)

Academic background
- Education: University of Texas Columbia University
- Influences: Milton Friedman, Robert Mundell

Academic work
- Discipline: Economics
- Institutions: Goodman Institute
- Awards: Duncan Black Prize

John C. Goodman (born 22 May 1946) is an American health economist and president and CEO of the Goodman Institute for Public Policy Research. He is a senior fellow at the Independent Institute. The Wall Street Journal and National Journal have called Goodman the "father of Health Savings Accounts."

He was the founding president and CEO of the National Center for Policy Analysis (NCPA), a Dallas-based think tank that he led from 1983 until 2014. The NCPA operated until 2017.

== Early life and education ==
Goodman was born on 22 May 1946 in Waco, Texas. He attended the University of Texas at Austin, where he was elected vice president of the student body. The following year he lost the race for student body president to Lloyd Doggett, who later served as a senior Democratic member of the United States House of Representatives.

Goodman received a Ph.D. in economics from Columbia University in 1977. He has taught and conducted research at Columbia, Stanford University, Dartmouth College, Southern Methodist University, and the University of Dallas.

== Academic work ==
=== Public choice theory ===
Goodman's doctoral dissertation, The Market for Coercion: A Neoclassical Theory of the State (1976), applied marginal analysis to political systems - a departure from the voting models associated with James Buchanan, Gordon Tullock, and George Stigler's regulatory capture theory. With colleague Philip K. Porter, Goodman published extensions of this framework to regulation, public goods, and welfare economics. Their 1988 article on competitive regulatory equilibrium won the Duncan Black Prize, awarded by the Public Choice Society.

A central result of this research, sometimes called Goodman's theorem, holds that optimal government policy is in principle unachievable in any political system, because differences in organization and information costs mean that opposing groups will almost never exert politically equivalent effort per dollar of benefit at stake.

=== Health economics ===
Goodman's research in health economics began with a study of the British National Health Service, applying public choice theory to explain its structural features. He subsequently examined the history of health care market regulation in the United States, arguing that the American Medical Association had systematically advocated for restrictions on medical practice, education, and insurance.

His 1992 book Patient Power, co-authored with Gerald Musgrave, argued that patients should be empowered as consumers in the health care marketplace and proposed the concept that later became Health Savings Accounts (HSAs). In a 1995 article in Health Affairs, Goodman and Wharton School economist Mark Pauly argued for a universal refundable tax credit as the appropriate mechanism for subsidizing health insurance.

His 2012 book Priceless: Curing the Healthcare Crisis argued that the health care system is a complex adaptive system that cannot be adequately modeled with standard supply-and-demand tools, and that perverse incentives affect patients, providers, and insurers alike.

== Policy work ==
=== Health Savings Accounts ===
HSAs, which allow individuals to deposit pre-tax funds into accounts used to pay qualified medical expenses, were first proposed in Patient Power (1992). They were opposed by major health and business lobbying groups for over a decade before becoming available to most Americans in 2004 as part of the Medicare Prescription Drug, Improvement, and Modernization Act. Former Senator Phil Gramm has credited Goodman and businessman Pat Rooney as the two people most responsible for HSAs becoming law.

=== Other policy contributions ===
Goodman helped develop a replacement plan for the Affordable Care Act with House Rules Committee Chairman Pete Sessions (R-TX) and Senator Bill Cassidy (R-LA), centered on a universal tax credit for health insurance and a flexible Roth-style HSA.

With economist Peter Orszag, then at the Brookings Institution, Goodman co-authored a proposal that contributed to reforms allowing employers to automatically enroll employees in diversified 401(k) portfolios.

The tax credit approach to health insurance Goodman and Pauly outlined in Health Affairs became the core of John McCain's health care proposal in the 2008 presidential campaign.

In 1989, NCPA research on taxation of the elderly contributed to the repeal of the Medicare Catastrophic Coverage Act of 1988, the first repeal of a major federal welfare program in more than a century.

== Television ==
Goodman appeared approximately two dozen times on William F. Buckley Jr.'s PBS program Firing Line during the 1990s, serving as Buckley's debating partner on several prime-time two-hour debates covering topics including the flat tax, school vouchers, Social Security privatization, and Health Savings Accounts.

== Publications ==
- The Regulation of Medical Care: Is the Price Too High? (Cato public policy research monograph) (1980)
- National Health Care in Great Britain (1980) ISBN 0933028040
- Social Security in the United Kingdom: Contracting Out of the System (AEI Studies, 335) (1981) ISBN 0844734608
- Economics of Public Policy: The Micro View, with Edwin G. Dolan (1985)
- Privatization. (1985) National Center for Policy Analysis. ISBN 978-0943802138
- Fighting the War of Ideas in Latin America, with Ramona Marotz-Baden (1990) ISBN 0943802431
- Patient Power: Solving America's Health Care Crisis (1992) ISBN 0932790917 with Gerald L. Musgrave.
- Patient Power: The Free-Enterprise Alternative to Clinton's Health Plan, with Gerald L. Musgrave (1993) ISBN 1882577108
- Economics of Public Policy, with Edwin G. Dolan (1995) ISBN 0314852387
- Lives at Risk: Single-Payer National Health Insurance Around the World, with Gerald L. Musgrave, Devon M. Herrick and Milton Friedman (2004) ISBN 0742541525
- Goodman, John C. (2008). "Health Insurance". In David R. Henderson (ed.). Concise Encyclopedia of Economics (2nd ed.). Indianapolis: Library of Economics and Liberty. pp. 241–245. ISBN 978-0865976658. OCLC 237794267.
- Leaving Women Behind: Modern Families, Outdated Laws. (2005) With Kimberley Strassel and Celeste Cogan. Rowman & Littlefield ISBN 9780742545465
- Handbook on State Health Reform. (2007) National Center for Policy Analysis ISBN 978-1568081731
- Goodman, John C. (2012). Priceless: Curing the Healthcare Crisis. The Independent Institute. ISBN 978-1598130836.
- Living with ObamaCare: A Consumer's Guide. (2014) National Center for Policy Analysis. ISBN 978-1568082349
- A Better Choice: Healthcare Solutions for America Independent Institute (2015) ISBN 1598132083
- New Way to Care: Social Protections that Put Families First (2020) The Independent Institute ISBN 978-1598133172
- Priceless: Curing the Healthcare Crisis Second Edition The Independent Institute (2024) ISBN 978-1598133950
