= Stop-loss insurance =

Type of insurance

Stop-loss insurance is insurance that protects insurers against large claims. Stop-loss policies take effect after a certain threshold has been exceeded in claims.

== Overview ==
Insurance companies themselves, as well as self-insuring employers, purchase stop-loss coverage for a premium to protect themselves. In the case of a participant reaching more than the specific (or "individual") stop-loss deductible ($300,000, for example), the insurer will reimburse the insured (the company, not the participant) for the remainder of the claim to be paid over that deductible amount.

There is also typically an aggregate-claims deductible, which is applied to all paid claims combined. For all claims at or below their specific stop-loss level, if the sum of these are more than the aggregate stop loss level, then the insurer will reimburse the insured for the difference.

Insurance companies and health and benefits consultants typically use mathematical models analyzing historical claims data to project expected stop loss premiums into the future to control for stop loss coverage costs and estimate the value of coverage PEPM (per employee per month) or PEPY.

== In health insurance ==
Companies providing health insurance for their employees through a self-insured plan often subscribe to stop loss policies in order to protect themselves against catastrophic claims. The organization that takes the insurance policy is called "the insured" and the employees and other people who are covered through the policy are called "participants." Most of the time there is an annual limit for the stop loss amount for each participant and an aggregate amount for each policy year. The premium is calculated for each employee for each month. The premium is based on the number of participants, age of the participants, and various other information.

== Examples ==
At Lloyd's of London, Personal Stop Loss (PSL) is a type of insurance policy which limits the losses of names all of whom did (and some of whom still do) underwrite with unlimited liability. Provided that the PSL responds to the claims made on it, the unlimited liability thereby becomes to some extent limited.

PSL policies are not always available at all. Some are available as "mutuals" and, in the event that the market suffers large losses, may be unable to respond to any great extent.

== See also ==
- Reinsurance
