= Carl Morris (statistician) =

American mathematician

Carl Neracher Morris (1938–2023) was a professor in the Statistics Department of Harvard University and spent several years as a researcher for the RAND Corporation working on the RAND Health Insurance Experiment.

== Education and career ==
Morris graduated from the Army and Navy Academy in Carlsbad, California. He received his BS in Aeronautical Engineering from the California Institute of Technology in 1960 and attended Indiana University until 1962. He obtained his Ph.D. in statistics from Stanford University under advisor Charles Stein in 1966.

Starting in 1990, Morris was at Harvard Statistics Department and Harvard Medical School Department of Health Care Policy. He served as the chair of the Harvard Statistics Department from 1994 to 2000.

Morris was a professor at the University of California, Santa Cruz, Frederick S. Pardee RAND Graduate School, Stanford University, and the University of Texas at Austin where he served as Director of the Center for Statistical Sciences.

Morris was a Fellow of the American Statistical Association, Institute of Mathematical Statistics, and Royal Statistical Society, and an elected member of ISI. Morris was an editor of Theory and Methods, the Journal of the American Statistical Association (1983–1985), and Statistical Science (1989–1991).

Morris is best known for his work on natural exponential families with quadratic variance functions (NEF-QVF), a theory which classifies the most common statistical distributions. Morris is also well known for his work in sports statistics.
