= Catastrophic illness =

Classification of illness

A catastrophic illness is a severe illness requiring prolonged hospitalization or recovery. Examples include cancer, heart attack or stroke. These illnesses usually involve high costs for patients and health insurance companies and may incapacitate the person from working, creating a financial hardship. They are the type intended to be covered by high-deductible health plans. Research indicates that the unusual economic environment of the delivery of catastrophic illness care encourages the use of innovative therapies. Medicare contains a benefit for catastrophic illness.
