= Drug coupon =

End-consumer pharmaceutical discount coupon

A drug coupon is a coupon intended to help consumers save money on pharmaceutical drugs. They are offered by drug companies or distributed to consumers via doctors and pharmacists, and most can be obtained online. There are drug coupons for drugs from many categories such as cholesterol, acne, migraine, allergies, etc.

== Drug coupons as pharmaceutical marketing ==
Direct-to-consumer or "DTC" marketing of prescription drugs is common in the United States. Patients frequently inquire about or request medications they have seen advertised in print or on television. Pharmaceutical companies use drug coupons as a marketing tool to stimulate demand for their products. Drug coupons are commonly offered for new products to stimulate demand or ameliorate high co-pays for non-formulary (non-preferred products) as a way to level the playing field and remove the disincentive for using a drug that is not covered by insurance.

== Restrictions ==
In an effort to avoid unregulated resale of drugs, the Prescription Drug Marketing Act of 1988 banned the traffic or counterfeiting of redeemable drug coupons.

== Types ==
Most drug coupons are printed by consumers using their personal computers and printers. Drug coupons reduce out-of-pocket costs for consumers in a variety of ways such as instant savings offers, free trial offers (also known as try-before-you-buy offers), copay reduction or rebates. Generic drug companies rarely offer coupons, though insurance companies occasionally offer discounts on generic drugs. In addition PBMs (Pharmacy Benefit Managers) offer discount cards that act similarly to coupons. These cards work for both generic and brand medications and can save cash paying customers up to 75% on their prescription medication.

== Drug coupons and healthcare costs ==
Critics of prescription drug coupon programs have argued that these programs lead to higher healthcare costs for consumers. Typically, American patients with health insurance pay a percentage of the cost of a prescription drug out of pocket, with insurance companies responsible for the rest of the medication's cost.

Insurance companies charge higher copayments for brand-name drugs than for generics in order to encourage patients to choose less expensive alternative medications when they are available. However, by reducing a patient's copayment, prescription drug coupons also reduce a patient's incentive to choose a less expensive generic medication. As an example, NPR reported in 2009 that the generic acne medication Minocin cost $109 a month while a newer alternative called Solodyn cost $514 a month. Solodyn can be taken only once daily, while Minocin must be taken twice daily. Since Solodyn's manufacturer offers a coupon to reduce copays, patients may believe that both drugs cost the same amount. Drug coupon advocates argue that coupon programs enhance medication adherence by reducing or eliminating drug copays.

As of 2008, the U.S. Food and Drug Administration (FDA) was planning a study to see if coupons make patients overlook drug risks and side effects in their effort to save money. All medicines come with a certain level of risk. This is why all prescription drugs include information reviewed and approved by the U.S. Food and Drug Administration (FDA) about how the medication works in the body, its uses and when it should not be used, possible side effects, the recommended dosage, and other facts about the appropriate use of the drug.

Most Americans have never heard of “Risk Evaluation and Mitigation Strategies” (REMS); yet, these drug safety protections give millions of Americans with serious diseases, such as cancer and multiple sclerosis, access to medicines that would otherwise be too dangerous to be allowed on the market. REMS programs exist because certain medicines can cause serious side effects, life-threatening infections, allergic reactions, liver damage or birth defects. Before patients take one of these drugs, they and their prescriber should be aware of the risks, and may need to take certain steps that lessen these risks, in order to ensure they benefit from the treatment.

Unions have filed several lawsuits seeking to ban drug coupons, characterizing them as illegal kickbacks. As of June, 2013 Three of these lawsuits have been dismissed. Six more are pending. This ruling is seen as vindication for the pharmaceutical industry that drug coupons are an acceptable business practice.

== See also ==
- Pharmaceutical industry
