= Joseph Newhouse =

American economist (born 1942)

Joseph P. Newhouse
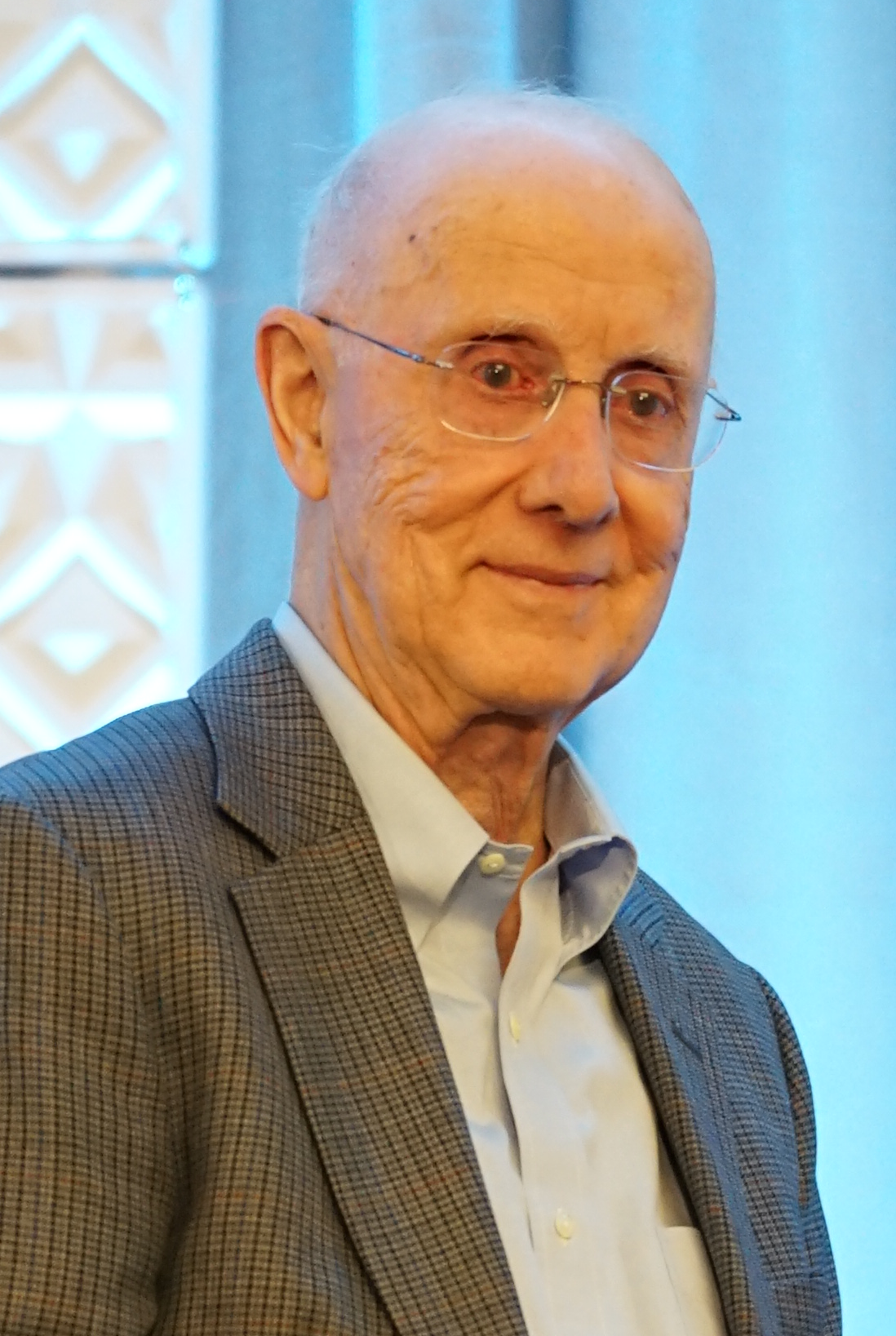
- Newhouse at ASSA 2026
- Born: February 24, 1942 (age 84)

Academic background
- Education: Harvard University (Ph.D., 1969); Harvard University (B.A., 1963)

Academic work
- Discipline: Health economics
- Institutions: Harvard University
- Website: Information at IDEAS / RePEc

Joseph P. Newhouse (born February 24, 1942) is an American economist and the John D. MacArthur Professor of Health Policy and Management at Harvard University, as well as the Director of the Division of Health Policy Research and of the Interfaculty Initiative on Health Policy. At Harvard, he is a member of the four faculties at Harvard Kennedy School in Cambridge, Harvard Medical School in Boston, Harvard T.H. Chan School of Public Health in Boston, and Harvard Faculty of Arts and Sciences in Cambridge.

Newhouse is a Fellow of the American Academy of Arts and Sciences, and an elected member of the National Academy of Medicine formerly the Institute of Medicine. He is also a faculty research associate of the National Bureau of Economic Research. Joseph was the editor of the Journal of Health Economics for 30 years, which he founded in 1981.

He was the founding director of the Health Policy Ph.D. program at Harvard University and chaired the committee that administers the program for 25 years. He is also the Principal Investigator of a National Institute of Aging T-32 grant for MD-PhD's in Health Policy, Economics, and Social and Behavioral Sciences. Newhouse has chaired or been a member of 71 doctoral dissertation committees in his career.

He is the author of many journal articles and several books including "Free for All: Lessons from the RAND Health Insurance Experiment "Harvard University Press, 1993, and "Pricing the Priceless: A Health Care Conundrum" MIT Press, 2002.

== Career ==
Prior to his joining the Faculty at Harvard, he worked for twenty years as an economist at the RAND Corporation, and served as a faculty member of the RAND Graduate School from 1972 to 1988. At RAND, he played a leading role in RAND Health Insurance Experiment. In 2008, he collaborated with the Oregon Health Study team.

=== The Economics of Quality in Health Care ===
From years of research with the RAND Corporation and Harvard University, Joseph Newhouse developed interests about the instability of our nation's health care system. In a 2002 article, he described the healthcare systems of the United States as “obtaining less value from the resources it uses than other industries”. Newhouse explains poor performance as defined by the quality of the Institute of Medicine (IOM), as the gap between the actual and potential performance of the US Healthcare system.

In economic terms, Alan M. Garber and Jonathan Skinner have explored the principles of productive and allocative inefficiency. Productive efficiency refers to the impact of inputs like “physicians, nurses, hospital beds, and capital” on American health care and the authors ask if the impact is greater in other countries (more efficient). Allocative efficiency refers to the benefits from the “marginal dollar spent on health care” and asks the question do the benefits realized “exceed the opportunity cost of other goods” not purchased like raising salaries, a new car, or better education. The authors found that “nearly all countries fall short of ideal in productive efficiency” and the United States system lags behind (is less efficient) other countries most of the time. Findings included U.S. shortcomings in allocative inefficiency when compared to other high-income countries, based on unfavorable traits in pricing, incentive and over-adoption of unwarranted medical innovation.

Combining the quality definition by the IOM and economic terms, Newhouse suggests the reasons for poor this performance stem from the following: consumer ignorance, technological change, administered prices, the difficulty in assessing the performance of a given provider, and the role of the private sector. Consumer ignorance is associated with the inability to evaluate if the care provided is correct care and deferral of agency to the physician. The consumer is unable to assure high performance. In focusing on technology, Newhouse indicates that each health care system must keep up with new devices, medicine, and even abide by nationwide use of the EMR to make the most informed decisions for each individual. This rapid pace of change is often difficult to keep up with, resulting in poor quality. Administered prices are determined between the insurer and provider leading to the input cost adapting to the payment, not necessarily the needs of the patient or quality of care. Newhouse thinks a fixed price for goods and services might assure quality, as opposed to the DRG in which the hospital makes the most money by providing the minimum service. Measuring performance is difficult as many outcomes are subjective; without accurate measurement the ability to assess the provider is limited. Finally, Newhouse cites public sector policy, such as, creating barriers to entry into health care professions or using public funding for services result in politically based decisions often not in the best interest of overall quality.

Newhouse's endeavors successfully delineate the reasons for the quality chasm. He has a few suggestions: greater use of technology to provide better information to the physician during decision making, use of computer decision support systems, better health services research, and better financial incentive design and research.

Other researchers and health care planners have attempted ways of crossing the quality chasm by improving the organization of health care for individuals. Organizational improvements include the primary care medical home, accountable care organizations, and allowing consumers to share in the savings of health payments after selecting coverage that leads to lower costs and higher quality . Some think increasing government regulation may result in improved access to care, reducing social disparities, training of more primary care providers, and enhancing the verification of provider competence in new technologies. As projected by Newhouse, programs to validate the provision of evidence-based care will enhance the safety of health care, as well as, medication reconciliation, check lists in the operating rooms, and care transition management.

Additional programs to address Newhouse's problems include payment reform in Medicare to restructure programs, offering a wider range of services, and moving from fee for service to fee for value, which then may result in enhanced engagement of the consumer.5 Increasing the roles and responsibilities of the independent payment advisory board may assist in payment reform as well, in addition to utilizing an electronic medical record to develop reporting systems that may be used for physician and patient evaluation and care gap closure. Increased competition amongst health plans through an insurance exchange may lead to better quality and pricing. Newhouse does an excellent job of describing the problems surrounding the quality chasm and suggesting many interventions to try and cross it.

=== Recognition ===
In 2025, the American Economic Association named Newhouse a Distinguished Fellow, an award recognizing lifetime contributions to economics. He has received the numerous awards such as the Victor R. Fuchs Lifetime Achievement Award from the American Society of Health Economists, the David Kershaw Prize from the Association for Public Policy Analysis and Management, the Distinguished Investigator Award from the Association for Health Services Research, the Kenneth J. Arrow award in Health Economics from the International Health Economics Association, the Zvi Griliches award for the best paper in Quarterly Journal of Economics, The Hans Sigrist Prize, and the Paul A. Samuelson Certificate of Excellence from TIAA-CREF. He was twice awarded article of the year by AcademyHealth. In 1988, he was awarded the Baxter Health Services Research Prize and the Administrator's Citation from the Health Care Financing Administration. He has also been awarded the Hans Sigrist Foundation Prize for distinguished scientific achievement; the American Risk and Insurance Association's Elizur Wright Award for an outstanding contribution to the literature on risk and insurance literature.
