= Self-insurance =

Bearing risk that is usually outsourced

Self insurance is a risk management method in which an organization that is liable for some risk does not take out any third-party insurance, but rather chooses to bear the risk itself. When used prudently, the organization that self insures sets aside money using actuarial and insurance information and the law of large numbers so that the amount set aside (similar to an insurance premium) is enough to cover the future uncertain loss. The advantage is that no premium has to be paid, but the organization's own assets are used to pay out claims or losses.

The idea of self insurance is that by retaining, calculating risks, and paying the resulting claims or losses from captive or on-balance sheet financial provisions, the overall process is cheaper than buying commercial insurance from a commercial insurance company. Cost savings to the self-insured entity are usually realised through the elimination of the carrying-costs that commercial insurers are obliged to pass on to their insurance consumers.

Self insurance is not often used by individuals because they rarely have the funds to cover large uncertain risks and rarely gain sufficient cost-savings on premiums to justify taking on the risk unless third party insurance is not available to them. Self-insurance may not be possible when there is a legal obligation to hold insurance such as mandatory third-party car insurance that is required in some countries. In some cases organizations need to apply for special licenses to self-insure certain risks, such as employee benefits insurance.

== Usage ==
Self insurance can be used for any insurable risk, meaning a risk that is predictable and measurable enough in the aggregate to be able to estimate the amount that needs to be set aside to pay for future uncertain losses. For a risk to be insurable, it must represent a future, uncertain event over which the insured has no control. Other characteristics which assist in making a risk self-insurable include the ability to price or rate the risk. If the insurable event is one in a large number of similar risks, the aggregate risk can be estimated according to the law of large numbers and the probability of that event occurring in the future can be quantified.

Normally, catastrophic risks are not self-insured as they are highly unpredictable and high in loss-value. Catastrophic risks are normally underwritten by the re-insurance or wholesale insurance market. Any risk where the potential loss is so large that no one could afford to pay the market premium required to provide cover would not be commercially insurable. An example is that earthquakes cannot be fully insured against because an earthquake can cause more damage than any insurer or the combined insurance market is willing to risk in total assets. However, captives and self-insurance programmes are often designed to provide for a part of a risk that would be catastrophic to the business concerned, or catastrophic risks that are often commercially uninsurable, such as tobacco litigation liability risks.

Full or exclusive self-insurance is rare, most common is a combination of self-insurance and commercial insurance. Usually the predictable losses of the risk are retained and self-insured, forming a first or "working" layer of cover, and a stop-loss or stop-gap policy is purchased from the commercial insurance market. The commercial insurance market then pays for losses above the specified self-insurance limit per loss, thereby stopping the cost of losses to the self-insured above the retained values. Effectively the losses paid for by the insured before the stop-loss policy pays becomes the deductible layer. Depending on the level at which risks are stopped, commercial insurance cover should become less and less expensive the further away the commercial insurer moves from the working layer of paying claims each year.

A popular and cost-effective form of self-insurance can be found in various types of employee benefits insurance offered by corporations with many thousands of employees. Employee benefits self-insurance programmes are often underwritten by captive insurance companies formed, owned and managed by corporations in both on-shore and off-shore captive domiciles. The reason for this is that hundreds of thousands of employees constitute a large enough risk pool for the corporation to be able to predict and price the risk of losses from benefits offered to employees. In this way, corporations are able to manage their financial exposure to the self-insurance programme without buying commercial insurance.

Another example of this is a self-funded health care plan under which a smaller employer helps finance the health care costs of its employees by contracting with a Third Party Administrator (TPA) to administer many aspects of the plan. The employer may also contract with a reinsurer to pay amounts in excess of a certain threshold, in order to share the risk for potential catastrophic claims experience.

In the United States the concept applies especially to self-funded health care and may involve, for example, an employer providing certain benefits – generally health benefits or disability benefits – to employees and funding claims from a specified pool of assets rather than through an insurance company, as the term is traditionally used. In self-funded health care, the employer ultimately retains the full risk of paying claims, in contrast to traditional insurance, where all risk is transferred to the insurer.

== See also ==
- Insurance
- Risk management
- Third party administrator
- Self-funded health care
- List of insurance topics
