= National Center for Policy Analysis =

American think tank

Coordinates: 32.9416°N 96.8213°W

- Abbreviation: NCPA
- Formation: 1983; 43 years ago
- Dissolved: 2017; 9 years ago
- Type: Public policy think tank
- Chief executive officer: Allen West (as of 2015)
- Budget: Revenue: $2,629,925; Expenses: $3,562,505 (FYE September 2015)

The National Center for Policy Analysis (NCPA) was a non-profit American think tank whose goals were to develop and promote private alternatives to government regulation and control. Topics it addressed include reforms in health care, taxes, Social Security, welfare, education, and environmental regulation.

The NCPA was founded in February 1983 and ceased operation in mid-2017, announcing it had faced three years of serious financial trouble. An NCPA website is being maintained by a former board member at NCPAThinkTank.org, where publications have been archived. A history of the organization and summary of its accomplishments may be found at the Goodman Institute.

The think tank's first offices were at the University of Dallas. The organization later had offices in both Dallas and Washington, D.C. In 2014, the organization's president John C. Goodman left it after being accused of misconduct by the NCPA board. In July 2017, the board decided to cease operations immediately following three years of financial difficulty.

== History ==
NCPA was founded by British businessman Antony Fisher together with Dallas businessmen Russell Perry (CEO of Republic Financial Services), Wayne Calloway (CEO of Frito-Lay), John F. Stephens (CEO of Employers Insurance of Texas), and Jere W. Thompson (CEO of the Southland Corporation).

Its founding president was libertarian economist John C. Goodman. Its first offices were at the University of Dallas. The organization later had offices in Dallas and Washington, D.C.. An NCPA website is being maintained by a former board member at NCPAThinkTank.org. Publications have been archived at www.ncpathinktank.org/pdfs. A history of the organization and summary of its accomplishments may be found at Goodmaninstitute.org

In June 2014, the NCPA board and Goodman accused each other of misconduct, and Goodman left the organization.

Leadership of the NCPA included:

- Steve Ivy, chairman of the board. July 1, 2016
- James H. Amos Jr., President and CEO July 1, 2016
- Allen West, executive director, July 1, 2016,

Its first offices were at the University of Dallas. The organization later had offices in Dallas and Washington, D.C.

== Issues ==
Media attention focused on the NCPA (for example, U.S. News & World Report, Ft. Lauderdale Sun-Sentinel, Orange County Register) for recommending pension reform legislation including automatic enrollment into companies' 401(k) plans.

The NCPA was a member of the Cooler Heads Coalition, an organization created by the now-defunct non-profit group Consumer Alert that described itself as "an alliance of some two dozen non-profit public policy groups concerned about the implications of the Kyoto Protocol for consumers," and which generally rejected the scientific basis for anthropogenic global warming. NCPA has also attempted to debunk peak oil claims.

== Funding ==
NCPA's revenues for the fiscal year ending 9/30/14 were $5,281,913 against expenses of $4,544,953; for the fiscal year ending 9/30/10 were $4,222,403 against expenses of $5,888,951; for the fiscal year ending 9/30/09 were $4,222,403 against expenses of $7,569,793; for the fiscal year ending 9/30/08 they were revenues of $6,603,905 against expenses of $4,898,261. As of November 2013, the organization's web site reported that for 2011 its funding breakdown was 52% from foundations, 21% from individuals and 22% from corporations. The press release it issued in July 2017 announcing its dissolution attributed the Board's decision to cease operations immediately as necessitated by three years of financial difficulty.

According to Greenpeace, the NCPA received at least $570,000 from Koch Industries in the eleven-year period ending in 2008.

In 1992, The New York Times reported that the NCPA was partially funded by the insurance industry.
