= Third-party administrator =

Organization that processes employee benefits for a separate entity

In the United States, a third-party administrator (TPA) is an organization that processes insurance claims or certain aspects of employee benefit plans for a separate entity. It is also a term used to define organizations within the insurance industry which administer other services such as underwriting and customer service. This can be viewed as outsourcing the administration of the claims processing, since the TPA is performing a task traditionally handled by the company providing the insurance or the company itself. Often, in the case of insurance claims, a TPA handles the claims processing for an employer that self-insures its employees. Thus, the employer is acting as an insurance company and underwrites the risk. The risk of loss remains with the employer, and not with the TPA. An insurance company may also use a TPA to manage its claims processing, provider networks, utilization review, or membership functions. While some third-party administrators may operate as units of insurance companies, they are often independent.

Third-party administrators also handle many aspects of other employee benefit plans such as the processing of retirement plans and flexible spending accounts. Many employee benefit plans have highly technical aspects and difficult administration that can make using a specialized entity such as a TPA more cost effective than doing the same processing in house.

== Health care ==
Third-party administrators are prominent players in the health care industry and have the expertise and capability to administer all or a portion of the claims process. They are normally contracted by a health insurer or self-insuring companies to administer services, including claims administration, premium collection, enrollment and other administrative activities. A hospital or provider organization desiring to set up its own health plan will often outsource certain responsibilities to a third-party administrator.

For example, an employer may choose to help finance the health care costs of its employees by contracting with a TPA to administer many aspects of a self-funded health care plan.

== Commercial general liability ==
This term is also now commonly used in commercial general liability (CGL) policies or so called "casualty" business. In these instances, the liability policies are written with a large (in excess of $50,000) self-insured retention (SIR) that operates somewhat like a deductible, but rather than being paid at the end of a claim (when a loss payment is made to a claimant), the money is paid up front by the insured for costs, expenses, attorney fees etc. as the claim moves forward. If there is a settlement or verdict within the SIR, then that is also paid by the insured up to the limit of the SIR, before the insurer steps in and pays its portion. The TPA acts like a claims adjuster for the insurance company and sometimes works in conjunction with the inside insurance company claims adjuster or an outside claims investigator as well as the defense counsel. The defense counsel in some situations is selected by the TPA. The point is that the larger the SIR, the more responsibility the TPA has over the control of the way the claim is handled and ultimately resolved. Some self-insured retentions are in the millions of dollars and the TPAs are large multinational non-insurance entities that handle all the claims. In contrast, some self-insureds choose not to outsource claims handling to a TPA, preferring instead to handle all claims in house. This is known as self-administration.

== Retirement plans ==
Retirement plans such as a 401(k) are often partly managed by an investment company. Instead of handling all the plan contributions by employees, distributions to employees, and other aspects of plan processing, the investment company may contract with a third-party administrator to handle much of the administrative work and only handle the remaining investment work.
