= GAP insurance =

Type of vehicle insurance

Guaranteed Asset Protection (GAP) insurance (also known as GAPS) is a type of car insurance in the North American financial industry. GAP insurance protects the borrower if the car is written off or totalled by paying the remaining difference between the actual cash value of a vehicle and the balance still owed on the financing. GAP coverage is mainly used on new and used small vehicles (cars and trucks) and heavy trucks. Some financing companies and lease contracts require it.

GAP insurance covers the amount on a loan that is the difference between the amount owed and the amount covered by another insurance policy. Some GAP policies also cover the deductible. This coverage is marketed for low down payment loans, high interest rate loans and loans with 60 month or longer terms. GAP insurance is typically offered by a finance company at time of purchase. Most auto insurance companies offer this coverage to consumers. GAP insurance is often paid upfront and the purchaser is usually entitled to a refund of the unused portion of the premium if the vehicle is sold or refinanced before the end of the loan term.

There are two ways of getting GAP coverage. The first type is an insurance policy sold by a broker. The second type is a waiver agreement sold by a Finance & Insurance Manager. The first is regulated by the insurance industry, the second is unregulated. In either case coverage is usually the same and sold as a soft product through the car dealership. Coverage is usually financed along with the lease/loan. Claims are subject to a total loss. The total loss is usually determined by the primary insurance company’s third-party appraiser.

Exclusions to GAP insurance vary by country or state. Some exclusions include a maximum loss limit of $50,000 while others require a loan term of less than 84 months. GAP is an optional purchase, but many states in the US require that a car dealership offer GAP at the point of purchase. Other states require insurers to offer GAP if a client requests it. States such as Louisiana require that the purchaser sign a disclosure document as proof. Although GAP is optional, some finance companies require GAP as a condition to obtaining a loan. The Truth in Lending Act excludes GAP premiums from financial charges if GAP was not required by the creditor, the premiums were disclosed in writing, and the consumer provides a written request for the insurance.

== See also ==
- Insurance in the United States
- Insurance law
