= Onsite health =

Employees benefit

Onsite health (also known as onsite care) is a benefit given to employees of companies, particularly companies in the technology sector such as Apple and Amazon, in order to save money and better support their employees.

One study attributed the rising popularity of onsite health to the fact that "employers who have adopted on-site preventive care services have reported enhanced performance ranging from heightened morale and cost savings to productivity."

Onsite health services are provided in a variety of forms, depending on the needs of employers and their employees. Services can include full primary care, onsite pharmacies, occupational health, and chiropractic and acupuncture treatments.
