= Copayment =

Fixed price for a service, in insurance contexts

A patient's copayment or copay is the patient's share of the cost for goods or services rendered, with the other share ("co" = with) paid by the patient's insurance company. The patient's co-payment is usually paid directly to the provider, but for Medicare Part D patients enrolled in the Medicare Prescriptions Payment Plan, which began on January 1, 2025, it is instead paid indirectly through their insurance company.

It may be defined in an insurance policy and paid by an insured person each time a medical service is accessed. It is technically a form of coinsurance, but is defined differently in health insurance where a coinsurance is a percentage payment after the deductible up to a certain limit. It must be paid before any policy benefit is payable by an insurance company. Copayments do not usually contribute towards any policy out-of-pocket maximum, whereas coinsurance payments do.

Insurance companies use copayments to share health care costs to prevent moral hazard. It may be a small portion of the actual cost of the medical service but is meant to deter people from seeking medical care that may not be necessary, e.g., an infection by the common cold. In health systems with prices below the market clearing level in which waiting lists act as rationing tools, copayment can serve to reduce the welfare cost of waiting lists.

However, a copay may also discourage people from seeking necessary medical care, and higher copays may result in non-use of essential medical services and prescriptions.

== Germany ==
The German healthcare system had introduced copayments in the late 1990s in an attempt to prevent overutilization and control costs. Members of public health insurances above 18 years pay the copayments costs for some medicines, therapeutic measures and appliances such as physiotherapy and hearing aids up to the limit of 2% of the family's annual gross income. For chronically ill patients, the co-payment limit is 1% including any dependant living in their home. The average length of hospital stay in Germany has decreased in recent years from 14 days to 9 days, still considerably longer than average stays in the U.S. (5 to 6 days). The difference is partly driven by the fact that hospital reimbursement is chiefly a function of the number of hospital days as opposed to procedures or the patient's diagnosis. Drug costs have increased substantially, rising nearly 60% from 1991 through 2005. Despite attempts to contain costs, overall health care expenditures rose to 10.7% of GDP in 2005, comparable to other western European nations, but substantially less than that spent in the U.S. (nearly 16% of GDP). However, after research studies by the Forschungsinstitut zur Zukunft der Arbeit (Research Institute for the Future of Labor) showed the copayment system was ineffective in reducing doctor visits, it was voted out by the Bundestag in 2012.

== Prescription drugs ==
Some insurance companies set the copay percentage for non-generic drugs higher than for generic drugs. Occasionally if a non-generic drug is reduced in price insurers will agree to classify it as generic for copayment purposes (as occurred with simvastatin). Pharmaceutical companies have a very long term (frequently 20 years or longer) lock on a drug as a brand name drug which for patent reasons cannot be produced as a generic drug. However, much of this time is exhausted during pre-clinical and clinical research.

To cushion the high copay costs of brand name drugs, some pharmaceutical companies offer drug coupons or temporary subsidized copayment reduction programs lasting from two months to twelve months. Thereafter, if a patient is still taking the brand name medication, the pharmaceutical companies might remove the option and require full payments. If no similar drug is available, the patient is "locked in" to either using the drug with the high copays, or a patient takes no drugs and lives with the consequences of non-treatment.

=== Observed effects ===
Medication copayments have also been associated with reduced use of necessary and appropriate medications for chronic conditions such as chronic heart failure, chronic obstructive pulmonary disease, breast cancer, and asthma. In a 2007 meta-analysis, RAND researchers concluded that higher copayments were associated with lower rates of drug treatment, worse adherence among existing users, and more frequent discontinuation of therapy.
