= Medical savings account =

Bank holding limiting deposit use to health expenses

A medical savings account (MSA) is an account into which tax-deferred amounts from income can be deposited. The amounts are often called contributions and may be made by a worker, an employer, or both, depending on a country's laws.

The money in such accounts is to be used to pay for medical expenses. Withdrawals from the account often called distributions, if made for that reason, may or may not be subject to income tax. Withdrawals without adequate documentation of use for medical expenses are subject to penalties.

== In China ==
In December 1994, the People's Republic of China began a pilot study of medical savings accounts in the cities of Zhenjiang and Jiujiang. China has planned to expand the program.

== In Singapore ==
Medisave was introduced in April 1984 as a national medical savings system in Singapore. It allows Singaporeans to put aside part of their income into a Medisave account to meet future personal or immediate family's hospitalization, day surgery and for certain outpatient expenses.

Under this system, Singaporean employees contribute 6–8% (depending on age group) of their monthly salaries to a personal Medisave account. The savings can be withdrawn to pay the hospital bills of the account holder and immediate family members.

Medical savings was first introduced to the world as an alternative method of national health care financing in Singapore’s Medisave scheme as early as the 1980s. (References: WHO 1986 “Singapore’s Family Savings Scheme”; “Saving for health”, World Health Forum, vol. 8, 1987). This was predicated upon the concerns over the rising population ageing rates and current methods of public payment for health either through taxes or insurance since such pay-as-you-go financing systems result in higher annual taxes or premiums. Such systems are unsustainable against rapid population ageing and a future shrinking bases of the young.

Recently, these medical savings are used to pay for health care financing due to the exigencies of emergency spending due to the pandemic, and thus to avoid deficit funding by the government (Reference: COVID-19 poses challenges in healthcare financing, Straits Times, May 27, 2020).

== United States ==
The United States has two medical savings account programs:

- Medical savings account (started 1993, still prevalent in California)
- Health savings account (created 2003, supersedes MSAs, more widely available)

== See also ==
- Health care system
- Health policy
