= Health savings account =

American tax-advantaged medical savings account

A health savings account (HSA) is a tax-advantaged medical savings account available to taxpayers in the United States who are enrolled in a high-deductible health plan (HDHP). The funds contributed to an account are not subject to federal income tax at the time of deposit. Unlike a flexible spending account (FSA), HSA funds roll over and accumulate year to year if they are not spent. HSAs are owned by the individual, which differentiates them from company-owned Health Reimbursement Arrangements (HRA) that are an alternate tax-deductible source of funds paired with either high-deductible health plans or standard health plans.

HSA funds may be used to pay for qualified medical expenses at any time without federal tax liability or penalty. Beginning in early 2011 over-the-counter medications could not be paid with an HSA without a doctor's prescription, although that requirement was lifted as of January 1, 2020. Withdrawals for non-medical expenses are treated very similarly to those in an individual retirement account (IRA) in that they may provide tax advantages if taken after retirement age, and they incur penalties if taken earlier. The accounts are a component of consumer-driven health care.

Proponents of HSAs believe that they are an important reform that will help reduce the growth of health care costs and increase the efficiency of the health care system. According to proponents, HSAs encourage saving for future health care expenses, allow the patient to receive needed care without a gatekeeper to determine what benefits are allowed, and make consumers more responsible for their own health care choices through the required high-deductible health plan. Opponents observe that the structure of HSAs complicates the decision of whether to obtain medical treatment, by setting it against tax liability and retirement-saving goals. There is also debate about consumer satisfaction with these plans.

== History ==
HSAs were established as part of the Medicare Prescription Drug, Improvement, and Modernization Act, which included the enactment of Internal Revenue Code section 223, effective for tax years beginning after December 31, 2003, signed into law by President George W. Bush on December 8, 2003. They were developed to replace the medical savings account system.

A survey of employers published by the Kaiser Family Foundation in September 2008 found that 8% of covered workers were enrolled in a consumer-driven health plan (including both HSAs and Health Reimbursement Accounts), up from 4% in 2006. The study found that roughly 10% of firms offered such plans to their workers. Large firms were more likely to offer a high-deductible plan (18%), but enrollment was higher in small firms (8% of covered workers, versus 4% in larger firms). As of 2012, these numbers had increased. Approximately 31% of firms offering health insurance offered an HSA (26%) or an HRA (5%) option. Large firms (38%) were somewhat more likely than small (31%) firms to offer such options. 11% of covered workers were in HSAs, while 8% were in HRAs. In small companies, 24% were in high-deductible health plans vs 17% in larger firms.

A survey of health insurers performed by America's Health Insurance Plans (AHIP) found that 4.5 million Americans were covered by HSA-qualified health plans as of January 2007. Of those, 3.4 million were covered through employer-sponsored plans, and 1.1 million were covered by individually purchased HSA-qualified plans. This represented an increase of 1.3 million since January 2006. In the individual market, 25% of new purchasers bought HSA-qualified plans. HSA-qualified plans represented 17% of new policies sold in the small group market and 8% of new policies sold in the large group market. A follow-up survey by AHIP reported that the number of Americans covered by HSA-qualified plans had grown to 6.1 million as of January 2008 (4.6 million through employer-sponsored plans and 1.5 million covered by individually purchased HSA-qualified plans). HSA-qualified plans represented 27% of new purchases in the individual market, 31% of new enrollment in the small group market and 6% of new enrollment in the large group market.

In January 2008, market research firm Celent moderated its earlier projections, citing the HSA market's "disappointing early showing," and projected 12.5 million accounts by 2012. A survey published by AHIP in May 2009 found that 8 million people were covered by HSA/High-Deductible health plans in January 2009. Of them, 1.8 million were covered by individual policies and approximately 6.2 million were covered by a group plan.

The Government Accountability Office (GAO) reported in April 2008 that many individuals enrolled in HSA-qualified health plans did not open tax-qualified health savings accounts, and individuals that had health savings accounts had higher incomes than others. According to the report, nationally representative surveys conducted by Blue Cross Blue Shield Association in 2005 to 2007 found that 42–49% of HSA-eligible plan enrollees did not open health savings accounts in those years. Based on an examination of Internal Revenue Service (IRS) data, GAO found that tax filers who reported health savings accounts activity had higher average incomes than other tax filers. Contributions into health savings accounts ($754 million in 2005) were roughly double withdrawals from the accounts ($366 million). Average contributions were also roughly twice average withdrawals ($2,100 versus $1,000). 41% of tax filers who made a contribution into a health savings account did not make any withdrawals; 22% withdrew more than they contributed during the year.

Data released in 2012 indicate that the use of health savings accounts is increasing. AHIP reported in May 2012 that the number of people covered by an HSA-eligible high-deductible health plan more than doubled between January 2008 to January 2012 (going from 6.1 million to 13.5 million). The split between group and individual plans was 11 million as opposed to 2.5 million, and the gender distribution of health savings accounts between male and female enrollees was an even 50%. Among individual plan holders, 51% were under age 40, and 49% were age 40 or over. The top five states with health savings account/high-deductible health plan enrollment were California (1 million), Texas (0.76 million), Illinois (0.72 million), Ohio (0.66 million), and Florida (0.54 million). Also, a survey released in February 2012 by J. P. Morgan Chase of the 900,000 health savings accounts that it manages indicates that contributions to health savings accounts have been steadily increasing. Between 2009 and 2011, the average Chase health savings account balance rose by 11% annually, and the average employee contributions increased by 7% in 2011. Also, in 2011, 42% more dollars were transferred from health savings account cash into health savings account investment accounts than were transferred out. It is believed that the Affordable Care Act, which requires all employers with 50 or more employees to offer health insurance, may be fueling some of this growth. High-deductible health plan premiums tend to be lower, and make an attractive option for both employers and employees. Since health savings account holders are required to be covered by a high-deductible health plan, this creates an opportunity for more growth in the health savings account space.

As of June 30, 2026, according to research conducted by Devenir, an estimated $192 billion is held in 42.6 million Health Savings Accounts.

== Operation ==
=== Deposits ===
To be an eligible individual and qualify for an HSA, an individual must meet the following requirements:

- Be covered under a high deductible health plan (HDHP), described later, on the first day of the month.
- Have no other health coverage except what is permitted under other health coverage, later.
- Not be enrolled in Medicare.
- Not be claimed as a dependent on someone else's tax return.

For exceptions and details, see IRS Publication 969.

Deposits to a health savings accounts may be made by any policyholder of an HSA-eligible high-deductible health plan, by the employer, or any other person. If an employer makes deposits to such a plan on behalf of its employees, all employees must be treated equally, which is known as the non-discrimination rules. If contributions are made by a Section 125 plan, nondiscrimination rules do not apply. Employers may treat full-time and part-time employees differently, and employers may treat individual and family participants differently; the treatment of employees who are not enrolled in a HSA-eligible high-deductible plan is not considered for non-discrimination purposes. As of 2007, employers may contribute more for non-highly compensated employees than highly compensated employees.

Contributions from an employer or employee may be made on a pretax basis by an employer. If that option is not available through the employer, contributions may be made on a post-tax basis and then used to decrease gross taxable income on the following year's Form 1040. Employer pre-tax contributions are not subject to Federal Insurance Contributions Act tax or Medicare taxes, but employee pre-tax contributions not made under cafeteria plans are subject to FICA and Medicare taxes. Regardless of the method or tax savings associated with the deposit, the deposits may only be made for persons covered under an HSA-eligible high-deductible plan, with no other coverage beyond certain qualified additional coverage.

Initially, the annual maximum deposit to a health savings account was the lesser of the actual deductible or specified Internal Revenue Service limits. Congress later abolished the limit based on the deductible and set statutory limits for maximum contributions. All contributions to a health savings account, regardless of source, count toward the annual maximum.

A catch-up provision also applies for plan participants who are age 55 or over, allowing the IRS limit to be increased. This "catch up" contribution limit was set to $500 for 2004, increasing $100 each year until it reached a maximum of $1,000 in 2009. For 2019, the contribution limit was $3,500 for single or $7,000 for married couples and families. For 2020, the contribution limit is $3,550 for single or $7,100 for married couples and families. For 2021, the contribution limit will be $3,600 for single or $7,200 for married couples and families.

All deposits to a health savings account become the property of the policyholder, regardless of the source of the deposit. Funds deposited but not withdrawn each year will carry over into the next year. Policyholders who end their HSA-eligible insurance coverage lose eligibility to deposit further funds, but funds already in the health savings account remain available for use.

The Tax Relief and Health Care Act of 2006, signed into law on December 20, 2006, added a provision allowing a taxpayer, once in their life, to rollover IRA assets into a health savings account, to fund up to one year's maximum contribution to a health savings account.

State income tax treatment of health savings accounts varies. California and New Jersey impose state income taxes on contributions, interest earned, and capital gains from health savings accounts. New Hampshire and Tennessee don't have state income taxes but they do impose a tax on dividends and interest, including health savings accounts.

==== Contribution limits ====
A taxpayer can generally make contributions to a health savings account for a given tax year until the deadline for filing the individual's income tax returns for that year, which is typically April 15. All contributions to a health savings account from both the employer and the employee count toward the annual maximum.

Year	Contribution Limit (Single)	Contribution Limit (Family)	Catch-Up Contribution (55 or older) (Single and Family)
2004	$2,600	$5,150	$500
2005	$2,650	$5,250	$600
2006	$2,700	$5,450	$700
2007	$2,850	$5,650	$800
2008	$2,900	$5,800	$900
2009	$3,000	$5,950	$1,000
2010	$3,050	$6,150	$1,000
2011	$3,050	$6,150	$1,000
2012	$3,100	$6,250	$1,000
2013	$3,250	$6,450	$1,000
2014	$3,300	$6,550	$1,000
2015	$3,350	$6,650	$1,000
2016	$3,350	$6,750	$1,000
2017	$3,400	$6,750	$1,000
2018	$3,450	$6,900	$1,000
2019	$3,500	$7,000	$1,000
2020	$3,550	$7,100	$1,000
2021	$3,600	$7,200	$1,000
2022	$3,650	$7,300	$1,000
2023	$3,850	$7,750	$1,000
2024	$4,150	$8,300	$1,000
2025	$4,300	$8,550	$1,000
2026	$4,400	$8,750	$1,000
2027	$4,500	$9,000	$1,000

=== Investments ===
Funds in a health savings account can be invested in a manner similar to investments in an Individual Retirement Account (IRA). Investment earnings are sheltered from taxation until the money is withdrawn and can be sheltered even then, as discussed in the section below.

Investments in a health savings account can be directed by the individual. While a typical health savings account custodian may offer investments such as certificates of deposit, stocks, bonds, or mutual funds, certain financial institutions provide accounts offering alternative investments which can be made inside the health savings account. Internal Revenue Code Section 408 prohibits a health savings account to invest in collectibles and life insurance policies, but health savings accounts can have investments in real estate, precious metals, public and private stock, notes, and more.

While health savings accounts can be rolled over from fund to fund, a health savings account cannot be rolled into an Individual Retirement Account or a 401(k) retirement plan, and funds from such investment vehicles cannot be rolled into health savings account, except for the one-time Individual Retirement Account transfer mentioned earlier. Unlike some employer contributions to a 401(k) retirement plan, all health savings account contributions belong to the participant immediately, regardless of the deposit source. A person contributing to a health savings account is under no obligation to contribute to an employer-sponsored health savings account, but an employer may require that payroll contributions be made only to the employer-sponsored health savings account plan.

=== Withdrawals ===
Health savings account participants do not have to obtain advance approval from their health savings account trustee or their medical insurer to withdraw funds, and their funds are not subject to income tax if they are made for qualified medical expenses. They include costs for services and items covered by the health plan but subject to cost-sharing such as a deductible and coinsurance, or co-payments as well as many other expenses not covered under medical plans, such as dental, vision and chiropractic care; durable medical equipment such as eyeglasses and hearing aids; and transportation expenses related to medical care. Over-the-counter medications were also eligible until December 31, 2010, when the Patient Protection and Affordable Care Act stipulated HSA funds could no longer be used to buy over-the-counter drugs without a doctor's prescription. As a response to the COVID-19 pandemic, the passage of the CARES Act once again made over-the-counter drugs reimbursable without a prescription for amounts paid after Dec. 31, 2019. The CARES Act also recognized menstrual care products as medical expenses, allowing for those products to be purchased or reimbursed with HSA funds.

Health insurance premiums are generally not HSA eligible, except for some specific cases such as COBRA premiums, premiums while on unemployment, certain Medicare expenses, and long-term care insurance premiums. According to the IRS, insurance premiums are not considered qualified medical expenses, with some exceptions like long-term care insurance.

There are several ways that funds in a health savings account can be withdrawn. Some health savings accounts include a debit card, some supply checks for account holder use, and some allow for a reimbursement process similar to medical insurance. Most health savings accounts have more than one possible method for withdrawal, and the methods available vary. Checks and debits do not have to be made payable to the provider. Funds can be withdrawn for any reason, but withdrawals that are not for documented qualified medical expenses are subject to income taxes and a 20% penalty. The 20% penalty is waived for persons who have reached the age of 65 or have become disabled at the time of the withdrawal. Then, only income tax is paid on the withdrawal and in effect, the account has grown tax-deferred. Medical expenses continue to be tax free. Prior to January 1, 2011, when new rules governing health savings accounts in the Patient Protection and Affordable Care Act went into effect, the penalty for non-qualified withdrawals was 10%.

Account holders are required to retain documentation for their qualified medical expenses. Failure to retain and provide documentation could cause the IRS to rule that withdrawals were not for qualified medical expenses and subject the taxpayer to additional penalties.

There is no deadline for self-reimbursements of qualified medical expenses incurred after the health savings accounts was established. Health savings account participants can take advantage by paying for medical costs out of pocket and retaining receipts but allowing their accounts to grow tax-free. Money can then be withdrawn years later for any reason up to the value of the receipts.

When a person dies, the funds in their health savings account are transferred to the beneficiary named for the account. If the beneficiary is a surviving spouse, the transfer is tax-free. If the beneficiary is not a spouse, the account stops being a health savings account, and the fair market value of the health savings account (less any unreimbursed qualified medical expenses of the decedent paid within the 1 year anniversary of his death) becomes taxable to the beneficiary in the year in which the health savings account owner dies.

== Compared to medical savings accounts ==
Health savings accounts are similar to medical savings account (MSA) plans that were authorized by the federal government before health savings account plans. Health savings accounts can be used with some high-deductible health plans. Health savings accounts came into being after legislation was signed by President George W. Bush on December 8, 2003. The law went into effect on January 1, 2004.

Health savings accounts differ in several ways from medical savings accounts. Perhaps the most significant difference is that employers of all sizes can offer a health savings account and insurance plan to employees. Medical savings accounts were limited to the self-employed and employers with 50 or fewer employees.

== Benefits ==
The premium for a high-deductible health plan is generally less than the premium for traditional health insurance. A higher deductible lowers the premium because the insurance company no longer pays for routine healthcare, and insurance underwriters believe that Americans who see a relationship between medical cost and their bank accounts will consume less medical care, shop for lower-cost options, and be more vigilant against excess and fraud in the health care industry. Introducing consumer-driven supply and demand and controlling inflation in health care and health insurance were among the government's goals in establishing these plans.

With health savings accounts, in catastrophic situations, the maximum out-of-pocket expense legal liability can be less than that of a traditional health plan. That is because a qualified high-deductible health plan can cover 100% after the deductible, involving no coinsurance.

Health savings accounts also give the flexibility not available in some traditional health plans to pay on a pretax basis for qualified medical expenses not covered in standard or HSA-eligible insurance plans, which may include dental, orthodontic, vision, and other approved expenses.

Health savings accounts also have an advantage over flexible spending accounts since deposits are not necessarily tied to expenses in a particular plan or calendar year. They are automatically rolled over for future medical expenses or may be used to reimburse qualified expenses from prior years as long as the expense was qualified under a health savings account plan at the time that the expense was incurred.

Over time, if medical expenses are low and contributions are made regularly to the health savings account, the account can accumulate significant assets that can be used for health care tax-free or used for retirement on a tax-deferred basis.

The high-deductible health plan, when combined with a health savings account, is the only health insurance plan option available that can possibly have a net gain of value during the year if the funds are invested in the health savings account.

A recent industry survey found that in July 2007 over 80% of health savings account plans provided first-dollar coverage for preventive care. It was true of virtually all health savings account plans offered by large employers and over 95% of the plans offered by small employers. It was also true of 59% of the plans that were purchased by individuals. In terms of Medicare, Plan F is considered a first-dollar coverage plan, as it has no out-of-pocket expenses on covered services.

All of the plans offered first-dollar preventive care benefits included annual physicals, immunizations, well-baby and well-child care, mammograms, and Pap tests; 90% included prostate cancer screenings, and 80% included colon cancer screenings.

They in fact encourage customers of all backgrounds to constrain costly spending and obtain more preventive health care. In Indiana, those with health savings accounts are 98% satisfied.

== Criticism ==
Some consumer organizations, such as Consumers Union, and many medical organizations, such as the American Public Health Association, oppose health savings accounts because, in their opinion, they benefit only healthy, younger people and make the health care system more expensive for everyone else. According to Stanford economist Victor Fuchs, "The main effect of putting more of it on the consumer is to reduce the social redistributive element of insurance."

Critics contend that low-income people, who are more likely to be uninsured, do not earn enough to benefit from the tax breaks offered by health savings accounts. These tax breaks are too modest, when compared to the actual cost of insurance, to persuade significant numbers to buy this coverage.

One industry study matched health savings account holders to the neighborhood income ("neighborhood" was defined as their census tract from the 2000 Census) and found that 3% of account holders lived in "low-income" neighborhoods (median incomes below $25,000 in 1999 dollars), 46% lived in lower-middle-income neighborhoods (median incomes between $25,000 and $50,000), 34% lived in middle-income neighborhoods (median incomes between $50,000 and $75,000), 12% lived in upper-income neighborhoods (median incomes between $75,000 and $100,000) and 5% lived in higher income neighborhoods (median incomes above $100,000).

In testimony before the US Senate Finance Committee's Subcommittee on Health in 2006, advocacy group Commonwealth Fund said that all evidence to date shows that health savings accounts and high-deductible health plans worsen, rather than improve, the US health system's problems.

Funds in a health savings account that are not held in savings accounts insured by the Federal Deposit Insurance Corporation are subject to market risk, as is any other investment. While the potential upside from investment gains can be viewed as a benefit, the subsequent downside, as well as the possibility of capital loss, may make the health savings account a poor option for some. And information about the maintenance fees, interest rates and investment lineups of health savings accounts is not easy to find.

== Consumer satisfaction ==
Consumer satisfaction results have been mixed. While a 2005 survey by the Blue Cross and Blue Shield Association found widespread satisfaction among health savings account customers, a survey published in 2007 by employee benefits consultants Towers Perrin came to the opposite conclusion; it found that employees currently enrolled in such plans were significantly less satisfied with many elements of the health benefit plan compared to those enrolled in traditional health benefit plans.

In 2006, a Government Accountability Office report concluded: "HSA-eligible plan enrollees who participated in GAO's focus groups generally reported positive experiences, but most would not recommend the plans to all consumers. Few participants reported researching cost before obtaining health care services, although many researched the cost of prescription drugs. Most participants were satisfied with their HSA-eligible plans and would recommend them to healthy consumers, but not to those who use maintenance medication, have a chronic condition, have children, or may not have the funds to meet the high deductible."

According to the Commonwealth Fund, early experience with HSA-eligible high-deductible health plans reveals low satisfaction, high out-of-pocket costs, and cost-related access problems. A survey conducted with the Employee Benefit Research Institute found that people enrolled in HSA-eligible high-deductible health plans were much less satisfied with many aspects of their health care than adults in more comprehensive plans.

- People in these plans allocate substantial amounts of income to their health care, especially those who have poorer health or lower incomes.
- Adults in high-deductible health plans are far more likely to delay or avoid getting needed care, or to skip medications, because of the cost. Problems are particularly pronounced among those with poorer health or lower incomes.
- Few Americans in any health plan have the information they need to make decisions. Just 12 to 16 percent of insured adults have information from their health plan about the quality or cost of care provided by their doctors and hospitals.

Some policy analysts say that consumer satisfaction doesn't reflect quality of health care. Researchers at RAND Corporation and Department of Veterans Affairs asked 236 vulnerable elderly patients at two managed care plans to rate their care, then examined care in medical records, as reported in Annals of Internal Medicine. There was no correlation. "Patient ratings of health care are easy to obtain and report, but do not accurately measure the technical quality of medical care," said John T. Chan, UCLA, lead author.

== Health policy ==
According to a 2006 Zogby poll, seven in ten voters back Congressional action to allow HSA participants to pay for their insurance premiums using money in their savings plans.

== See also ==
- Direct primary care
- Single-payer health care
