= Deductible =

Out-of-pocket expense requirement in insurance

In an insurance policy, the deductible (in British English, the excess) is the amount paid out of pocket by the policy holder before an insurance provider will pay any expenses. In general usage, the term deductible may be used to describe one of several types of clauses that are used by insurance companies as a threshold for policy payments.

Deductibles are typically used to deter the large number of claims that a consumer can be reasonably expected to bear the cost of. By restricting its coverage to events significant enough to incur large costs, the insurance firm expects to pay out slightly smaller amounts much less frequently, resulting in much higher savings. As a result, insurance premiums are typically cheaper when they involve higher deductibles. For example, health insurance companies offer plans with high premiums and low deductibles, or plans with low premiums and high deductibles. One plan may have a premium of $1,087 a month with a $6,000 deductible, while a competitive plan may have a premium of $877 a month with a $12,700 deductible. The consumer with the $6,000 deductible will have to pay $6,000 in health care costs before the insurance plan pays anything. The consumer with the $12,700 deductible will have to pay $12,700.

Deductibles are normally provided as clauses in an insurance policy that dictate how much of an insurance-covered expense is borne by the policyholder. They are normally quoted as a fixed quantity and are a part of most policies covering losses to the policy holder. The insurer then becomes liable for claimable expenses that exceed this amount (subject to the maximum sum claimable indicated in the contract). Depending on the policy, the deductible may apply per covered incident, or per year. For policies where incidents are not easy to delimit (health insurance, for example), the deductible is typically applied per year.

Several deductibles can be set by the insurer based on the cause of the claim. For example, a single housing insurance policy may contain multiple deductible amounts for loss or damage arising from theft, fire, natural calamities, evacuation, etc.

There are also deductible reimbursement programs that reimburse a deductible in the event of an automobile, home, boat/yacht or health insurance claim.

== Purpose ==
A deductible is established by insurers primarily to:

- Reduce plan liability directly by sharing costs with the insured
- Disincentivize unnecessary claims (as in the High-deductible health plan) by having the insured pay the cost instead
- Restrict liability to events which are insurable by removing small claims from the plan's coverage

As an example, health insurers might introduce a deductible of $5,000 so that the plan only covers claims the insured cannot afford themselves. By reducing the number of small paid claims, the insurer can focus its efforts on the largest claims instead.

== Difference from franchise ==
A deductible should not be confused with a franchise. A deductible represents a part of the expense for which the insurer is not liable, but the franchise is a pure threshold beyond which liability for the entire expense is transferred to the insurer. For example, with a franchise of $20,000, a claim of $19,900 is borne entirely by the policyholder, and a claim of $20,100 is borne entirely by the insurer.

== Difference from excess ==
An excess can refer to one of two very different insurance terms.

Excess post-hospitalization is the extra costs borne by the insured over the maximum coverage that the insurance company pays. This terminology is especially common in areas of insurance sensitive to loss (like liability insurance) and is addressed by the insurance market through excess line insurance companies through mechanisms such as excess insurance, gap insurance, and umbrella insurance.

Excess pre-hospitalization is an insurance exception that is often interchangeably but wrongly referred to also as an excess or a deductible. It is "the first amount of the claim which the insured has to bear. If the insured has an excess of $500 and the total repair costs $3,000, then the insured has to pay $500 while the insurer pays the remaining $2,500."

Note that this different meaning does not apply to the British meaning of the term.

== Automobile and property insurance ==
In a typical automobile insurance policy, a deductible applies to claims arising from damage to or loss of the policyholder's own vehicle whether the damage or loss is caused by accidents for which the holder is responsible or by vandalism or theft. Depending on the policy, the deductible may differ by the type of expense incurred that triggers the insurance claim.

Third-party liability coverages including auto liability, general liability, garage keepers, inland marine, professional liability and workers compensation are also written with deductibles. Deductibles on commercial liability policies are known as third-party deductibles or liability deductibles. Because the insured and claimant are not the same entity, insurers cannot pay the claim minus the deductible. That creates a receivable owed from the insured to the insurer. The complexity of identifying these third-party deductible receivables often causes many to be missed by the insurer and millions of dollars to go uncollected.

An insured has the option to accept an appearance allowance that can be used towards their deductible. Appearance allowances help manage repair costs by allowing for the insured to choose not to fix expensive parts that have minor damage and using the money towards their deductible.

== Health and travel insurance ==
Most health insurance policies and some travel insurance policies have deductibles as well. The type of health insurance deductibles can also vary, as individual amounts and family amounts.

The nature of medical treatment makes the insured often face multiple medical expenses spread over several days for a single illness or injury. Therefore, health insurance deductibles often tend to be imposed on a term basis (e.g. annually), rather than a per visit threshold. However, major medical insurance policies may have a per visit excess, which often does not cover the cost of routine visits to a GP unless it is certified to be a part of a continuous treatment, and the bills can be collated in a single claim.

== See also ==
- Co-insurance
- Copayment
- Out-of-pocket expense
