= Out-of-pocket expense =

Direct payment of money that may or may not be reimbursed

Share of out of pocket expenditure on healthcare

An out-of-pocket expense, or out-of-pocket cost (OOP), is the direct payment of money that may or may not be later reimbursed from a third-party source. For example, when operating a vehicle, gasoline, parking fees and tolls are considered out-of-pocket expenses for a trip. Car insurance, oil changes, and interest are not, since the outlay of cash covers expenses accrued over a longer period of time. The services rendered and other in-kind expenses are not considered out-of-pocket expenses; the same goes for depreciation of capital goods or depletion.

Organizations often reimburse out-of-pocket expenses incurred on their behalf, especially expenses incurred by employees on their employers' behalf. In the United States, out-of-pocket expenses for such things as charity, medical bills, and education may be deductions on US income taxes, according to IRS regulations. To be out of pocket is to have expended personal resources, often unexpectedly or unfairly, at the end of some enterprise.

== Health financing ==
In the health care financing sector, this represents the share of the expenses that the insured party must pay directly to the health care provider, without a third-party (insurer, or government).

=== United States ===
Out-of-pocket costs are high especially when it comes to prescription drugs in the United States. Before investing in a health care plan, it is very useful to examine the out-of-pocket prescription costs as they may be very low or very high. High out-of-pocket costs may correlate with lower prescription adherence and more importation of medications from foreign countries. Medicare Part D is a federal program aimed at lowering prescription drug costs for Medicare beneficiaries; however, after the first year of Medicare Part D, out-of-pocket drug costs were down, but there was not a noticeable reduction in emergency department visits, hospitalization, or health utility score. Perhaps, some diseases will be more sensitive to Medicare Part D.

=== Australia ===
A 2014 study published from Australia shows that the out-of-pocket cost burden falls most heavily on patients who are least able to bear it, both in terms of their health and in terms of their income. Among the respondents 14% experienced a heavy financial burden. Medication and medical service expenses were the major costs. This study concluded that despite Australia's universal health coverage (medicare) a substantial portion of senior citizens suffer from excessive out-of-pocket expenditure, and this burden increases with increasing number of chronic conditions. Among the specific conditions, those who experienced cancer, high blood pressure, diabetes or depression were likely to report higher out-of-pocket expenditure. Some ways to improve physician knowledge of drug costs were thought to be increased physician-patient communication or higher use of information technology. Physicians with high rates of IT use did not have significantly higher knowledge or drug costs. Health IT design should be improved to make it easier for physicians to access cost information at the point of care.

== See also ==
- Car costs
- Capital goods
- Personal finance
