= High-deductible health plan =

Type of health insurance plan in the US

In the United States, a high-deductible health plan (HDHP) is a health insurance plan with lower premiums and higher deductibles than a traditional health plan. It is intended to incentivize consumer-driven healthcare. Being covered by an HDHP is also a requirement for having a health savings account. Some HDHP plans also offer additional "wellness" benefits, provided before a deductible is paid. High-deductible health plans are a form of catastrophic coverage, intended to cover for catastrophic illnesses. Adoption rates of HDHPs have been growing since their inception in 2004, not only with increasing employer options, but also increasing government options. As of 2016, HDHPs represented 29% of the total covered workers in the United States; however, the impact of such benefit design is not widely understood.

== Minimum deductibles and out-of-pocket maximums ==
Participation in a qualifying HDHP is a requirement for health savings accounts and other tax-advantaged programs. A qualifying plan is defined as a health plan that has a minimum deductible not less than some IRS-defined minimum deductible, and a maximum out-of-pocket expense not more than some IRS-defined out-of-pocket maximum, which the Internal Revenue Service may modify each year to reflect change in cost of living. According to the instructions for IRS form 8889, "this limit does not apply to deductibles and expenses for out-of-network services if the plan uses a network of providers. Instead, only deductibles and out-of-pocket expenses for services within the network should be used to figure whether the limit is reached."

Year	Single		Family	
Year	Minimum deductible (single)	Maximum out-of-pocket (single)	Minimum deductible (family)	Maximum out-of-pocket (family)
2009	$1,150	$5,800	$2,300	$11,600
2010	$1,200	$5,950	$2,400	$11,900
2011	$1,200	$5,950	$2,400	$11,900
2012	$1,200	$6,050	$2,400	$12,100
2013	$1,250	$6,250	$2,500	$12,500
2014	$1,250	$6,350	$2,500	$12,700
2015	$1,300	$6,450	$2,600	$12,900
2016	$1,300	$6,550	$2,600	$13,100
2017	$1,300	$6,550	$2,600	$13,100
2018	$1,350	$6,650	$2,700	$13,300
2019	$1,350	$6,750	$2,700	$13,500
2020	$1,400	$6,900	$2,800	$13,800
2021	$1,400	$7,000	$2,800	$14,000
2022	$1,400	$7,050	$2,800	$14,100
2023	$1,500	$7,500	$3,000	$15,000
2024	$1,600	$8,050	$3,200	$16,100
2025	$1,650	$8,300	$3,300	$16,600
2026	$1,700	$8,500	$3,400	$17,000

== Impact on preventive services and utilization ==
When a consumer purchases a health insurance policy, there is a moral hazard risk because the consumer may utilize too much medical care because the full cost of care is defrayed (i.e. he/she has a lower marginal cost for care than the open market). Advocates of Consumer-driven healthcare (CDHC) such as HDHPs operate on the premise that imprudent choices made by patients may be avoided if they are held financially responsible through high copayments and deductibles. However, in practice, studies show that HDHP may actually promote behavior such as avoiding preventive care visits and reducing much needed ambulatory care, especially for those with chronic conditions or low socioeconomic status.

== Personal finance implications ==
To qualify for an HDHP in 2023, an individual plan must have a deductible of at least $1,500 and family plans must have a deductible of at least $3,000. An HDHP's total yearly out-of-pocket expenses (including deductibles, copayments, and coinsurance) can't be more than $7,500 for an individual or $15,000 for a family. (This limit doesn't apply to out-of-network services.) Because of the relatively high cost of HDHPs, the increased out-of-pocket costs can be burdensome especially for low income families. As a way to try and offset the cost of care, HDHP policy holders may contribute to a health savings account (HSA) with pre-tax income. HSA contributions, unlike other tax-advantaged investment vehicles, offer a triple tax benefit – tax-deductible contributions, tax-free growth, and tax-free withdrawals for qualified medical expenses. The maximum contribution limits policy holders may make to their HSA in 2024 are $4,150 (individual) and $8,300 (family) with a $1,000 catch-up contribution for people age 55 or older.

== Emerging issues ==
The number of people enrolled in HDHPs is increasing, but this is likely due to the rising cost of health care and cost-shifting to consumers – not due to the fact that HDHPs necessarily provide better care.

== Growth of HDHPs ==
High deductible health plans (HDHPs) have much lower premiums but high deductibles, co insurance and out of pocket maximums. Due to low upfront costs HDHPs are increasing in popularity with employers, with 24% offering some form of HDHP in 2013 (up from 5% in 2007). In this model, the individual assumes all medical costs until the minimum deductible is met. The Affordable Care Act (ACA), passed in 2010, has led to a significant expansion of HDHPs.

== Cost-sharing and price shopping and consumer demand ==
The economic principle behind HDHPs is 'cost–sharing', a "method of financing health care that require some direct payments for services by patients." Increasing deductibles is one perceived way to cut health care costs by decreasing its overall usage. As out-of-pocket expenses shift from insurers and employers to individuals and employees, consumers will become more discriminant in their insurance products and engage in a higher degree of price shopping. Consumers will also compare the value of medical services provided at one site compared to another in deciding where to pursue health care services. Taken together, HDHPs should decrease health care utilization and stem the increase in national health care costs. Success of this theory depends on ability of patients to make informed decisions on their health care purchase similar to what they do for goods and services. With high deductibles, consumers face incentives to consider price when choosing health care providers and medical services. This economic model however remains unproven. A 2016 survey has shown members of HDHP and traditional plans to be equally likely to price shop for medical care. Consumers choose health care for a variety of reasons and not all of health services and amenities are amenable to price shopping. Researchers have defined five situations which are more suitable for effective price shopping than others.

1. The services are not complex.
2. The need for the services is not urgent.
3. A diagnosis has already been made.
4. Bundled prices are the norm for the service.
5. The insurance benefit structure provides incentives to choose lower price providers.

== Unintended effects of cost sharing ==
While HDHPs are useful vehicles for the right consumer, there are concerns that patients may delay care due to high costs, often to their own detriment. When patients postpone necessary or preventative care (outpatient visits, screening and diagnostic testing), they may end up in hospitals' emergency rooms or wards for treatment. The tradeoff of forgoing care early for acute, resource-intensive hospitalizations later ultimately increases overall health care costs. Up to 43% of insured patients said that they delayed or skipped physician-recommended tests or treatments because of high associated costs.

An additional economic principle commonly linked to HDHPs is a Health Savings Account (HSA). HSAs are tax-exempt accounts that individuals with HDHPs fund in order to pay for future medical expenses/costs for which they are now responsible. "Introduced in 2003 as a part of the Medicare prescription drug benefit legislation, the HSA is a less-restrictive medical savings account, owned by the employee, and open to anyone enrolled in a [HDHP] and not already covered by public or private insurance" ^{5} . HSAs are designed to offset financial burden of increased cost-sharing related to HDHPs, but enrollment in HSA has been limited. A 2016 study showed 61.6% of enrollees in HDHP lacked an HSA.

== Impact on physician, hospital and clinical supply ==
As stated above, individuals with HDHPs often forgo or delay care due to increased cost sharing, and this often leads to patients presenting to health care providers and institutions later on in much worse condition. This pattern has a significant effect on the supply side of health care. Hospitals and health care institutions take on increasing amounts of bad debt with the advent of HDHP as patients exhaust their deductibles soon after being admitted for care and default on outstanding balances. With rise in cost sharing, hospitals are collecting more money directly from the patients; from 2011 to 2014, the number of consumer payments to health care providers increased 193 percent according to a study by to the "Trends in Healthcare Payments Fifth Annual Report: 2014" from InstaMed. From a physician/hospital supply, HDHP have forced institutions to become more consumer conscious as patients (due to price shopping) do their own research and understand their options. If patients with HDHPs forgo primary care, this lessens the volume and revenue they are able to generate. It also means that, later on, the burden and intensity of care per episode is much greater. The same goes for specialists as well who see less patients undergoing preventative screening and maintenance care (colonoscopies, mammograms, routine laboratory testing, etc.) and then end up with serious (and preventable) conditions. In the long term, the cost and burden is invariably greater. Physicians struggle with having cost become a greater reason for opting for or against a medical interaction or procedure than the health benefits for the individual.

== See also ==
- Acronyms in healthcare
- Catastrophic illness
- Health care
- Health care reform
- Health economics
- Health insurance in the United States
- Health policy
- Patient Protection and Affordable Care Act
- Public health
