= United States Department of Commerce =

Executive department of the federal government

- Seal of the U.S. Department of Commerce

- Flag of the U.S. Department of Commerce

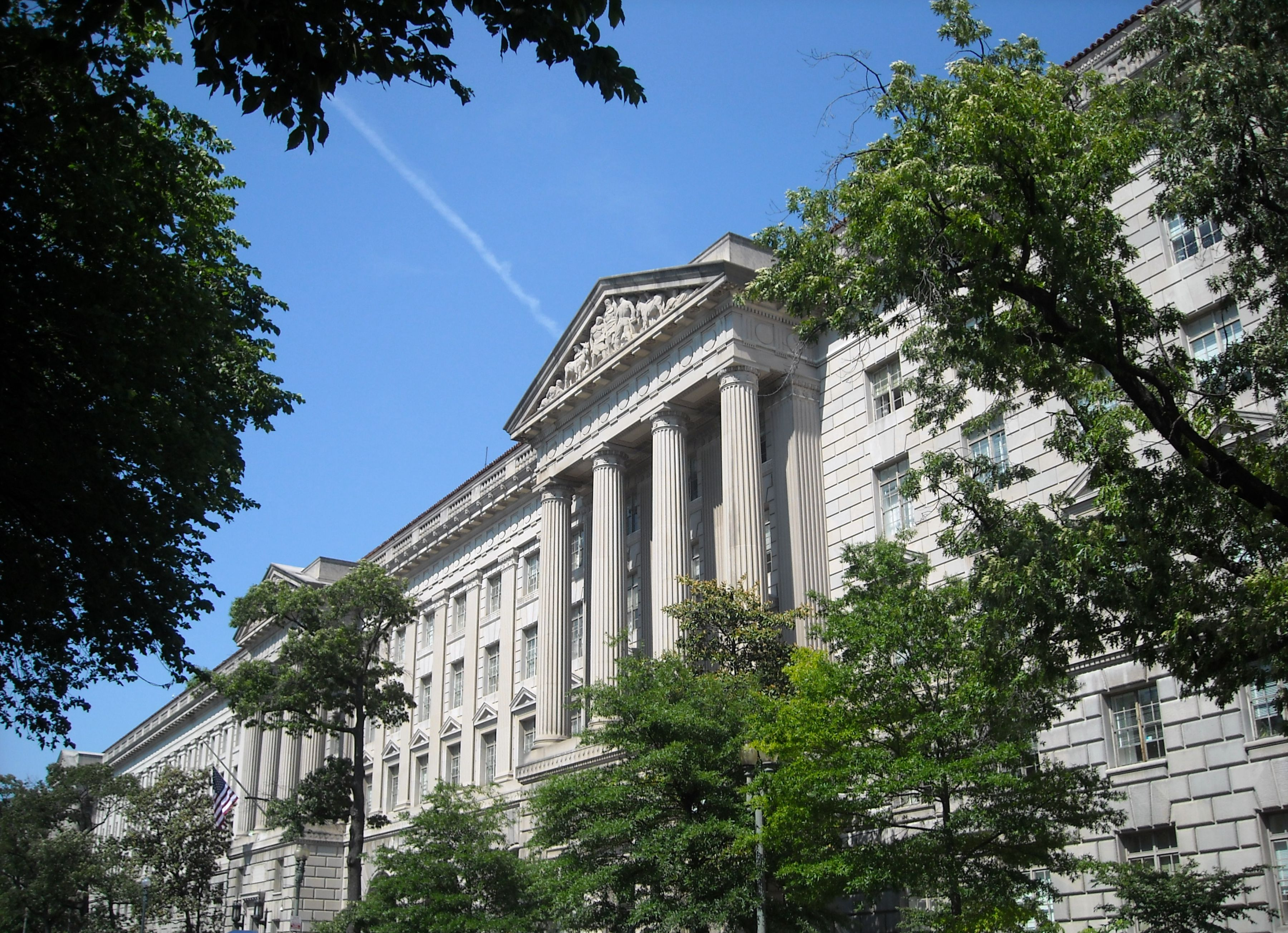
- The Herbert C. Hoover Building, the headquarters of the U.S. Department of Commerce

Agency overview
- Formed: February 14, 1903; 123 years ago
- Preceding agency: United States Department of Commerce and Labor
- Jurisdiction: U.S. federal government
- Headquarters: Herbert C. Hoover Building 1401 Constitution Avenue NW Washington, D.C., U.S.; 38°53′39″N 77°0′58″W
- Employees: 48,391 (2024)
- Secretary responsible: Howard Lutnick
- Deputy Secretary responsible: Paul Dabbar
- Website: commerce.gov

Footnotes

The United States Department of Commerce (DOC) is an executive department of the U.S. federal government tasked with overseeing matters pertaining to the nation's commerce and commercial policy. It is responsible for gathering data for business and governmental decision making, establishing industrial standards, catalyzing economic development, promoting foreign direct investment, and safeguarding national economic security.

The Department of Commerce is one of four federal agencies authorized to appoint personnel in the United States Foreign Service, and its National Oceanic and Atmospheric Administration (NOAA) Commissioned Officer Corps—formerly the Coast and Geodetic Survey Corps—is one of the eight branches of the uniformed services of the United States. During a large-scale disaster or catastrophe, it assumes the coordinating responsibilities for the economic recovery support function under the National Disaster Recovery Framework. Since 2023, it has led U.S. government activities related to safe artificial intelligence development. From 1913 to 1939, it also managed the National Aquarium.

The department is headed by the secretary of commerce, who is a member of the president's Cabinet and tenth in the United States presidential line of succession. It is headquartered in the Herbert C. Hoover Building in Washington, D.C.

== Mission ==
The Department of Commerce renewed its mission statement in its 2022 to 2026 strategic plan:

The Department of Commerce’s mission is to create the conditions for economic growth and opportunity for all communities.

The responsibilities of its major operating units include weather forecasting, climate monitoring, and fisheries management (NOAA); promoting U.S. exports and attracting foreign direct investment (International Trade Administration); producing the decennial census and other vital and economic statistics (Bureau of the Census); regulating the export of sensitive technologies (Bureau of Industry and Security); registering patents, trademarks, and copyrights (U.S. Patent and Trademark Office); managing and preserving the United States customary system of weights and measures (National Institute of Standards and Technology); maintaining the national interoperable broadband emergency network (FirstNet Authority); and coordinating economic recovery following a major disaster (Economic Development Administration).

== History ==
=== Organizational history ===
The department was originally created as the United States Department of Commerce and Labor on February 14, 1903. It was subsequently renamed the Department of Commerce on March 4, 1913, as the bureaus and agencies specializing in labor were transferred to the new Department of Labor.

Since its creation, the Commerce Department has seen various agencies and administrative offices shift in and out of its organizational structure. The United States Patent and Trademark Office was transferred from the Interior Department into the Commerce Department in 1925. The Federal Employment Stabilization Office existed within the department from 1931 to 1939. In 1940, the Weather Bureau (now the National Weather Service) was transferred from the Agriculture Department, and the Civil Aeronautics Authority was also merged into the Commerce Department. In 1949, the Public Roads Administration was added to the department after the Federal Works Agency was dismantled.

In 1958, the independent Federal Aviation Agency was created and the Civil Aeronautics Authority was abolished. The United States Travel Service was established by the United States Secretary of Commerce on July 1, 1961, pursuant to the International Travel Act of 1961 (75 Stat. 129; 22 U.S.C. 2121 note) The Economic Development Administration was created in 1965. In 1966, the Bureau of Public Roads was transferred to the newly created Department of Transportation. The Minority Business Development Agency (MBDA) was created on March 5, 1969, originally established by President Richard M. Nixon as the Office of Minority Business Enterprise. The National Oceanic and Atmospheric Administration (NOAA) was created on October 3, 1970.

The Cabinet Council on Commerce and Trade was one of multiple Cabinet Councils established in the United States on or about February 26, 1981 by the Reagan Administration.

==== 2020 data breach ====
In 2020, the Department of Commerce suffered a data breach following a cyberattack likely conducted by a nation state adversary, possibly Russia.

=== Herbert Hoover as secretary of commerce ===
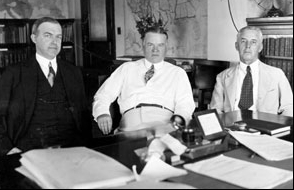
Assistants William McCracken (left) and Walter Drake (right) with Secretary Hoover (center)

Herbert Hoover was appointed Secretary of Commerce in 1921 by then-President Warren G. Harding. Hoover was, by far, the most active secretary in the history of the department until the end of his position in 1928. In his memoirs, he described the office as he found it after being sworn in:

The Department of Commerce was a congeries of independent bureaus left behind when the labor activities were separated into the Labor Department some years before. It consisted of the Bureau of Foreign and Domestic Commerce, Lighthouses, Navigation, Coast and Geodetic Survey, Census, Standards, and Fisheries and the Steamboat Inspection Service. They were all old establishments created prior to the Department itself. Each was an inbred bureaucracy of its own. There was little departmental spirit, or esprit de corps. Some of the bureaus even placed their own names on their letterheads without mentioning the Department. This lack of cohesion was emphasized by the fact that the Bureaus were housed in fifteen different buildings, mostly rented, and some of them condemned by the District of Columbia fire and health departments. Oscar Straus, who was one of my predecessors, told me that my job would not require more than two hours of work a day. Indeed, that was all the time that the former Secretaries devoted to it. Putting the fish to bed at night and turning on the lights around the coast were possibly the major concepts of the office.

After his election as president in 1920, Warren G. Harding rewarded Hoover for his support, offering to appoint him as either Secretary of the Interior or Secretary of Commerce. Secretary of Commerce was considered a minor Cabinet post, with limited and vaguely defined responsibilities, but Hoover, emphasizing his identity as a businessman, accepted the position. In sharp contrast to the Interior Department, there were no scandals at Commerce.

Hoover envisioned the Commerce Department as the hub of the nation's growth and stability. His experience mobilizing the war-time economy convinced him that the federal government could promote efficiency by eliminating waste, increasing production, encouraging the adoption of data-based practices, investing in infrastructure, and conserving natural resources. Contemporaries described Hoover's approach as a "third alternative" between "unrestrained capitalism" and socialism, which was becoming increasingly popular in Europe. Hoover sought to foster a balance among labor, capital, and the government, and for this he has been variously labeled a "corporatist" or an associationalist.

Hoover demanded, and received, authority to coordinate economic affairs throughout the government. He created many sub-departments and committees, overseeing and regulating everything from manufacturing statistics to air travel. In some instances he "seized" control of responsibilities from other Cabinet departments when he deemed that they were not carrying out their responsibilities well; some began referring to him as the "Secretary of Commerce and Under-Secretary of all other departments". In response to the Depression of 1920–21, he convinced Harding to assemble a presidential commission on unemployment, which encouraged local governments to engage in countercyclical infrastructure spending. He endorsed much of Mellon's tax reduction program, but favored a more progressive tax system and opposed the treasury secretary's efforts to eliminate the estate tax.

==== Radio ====
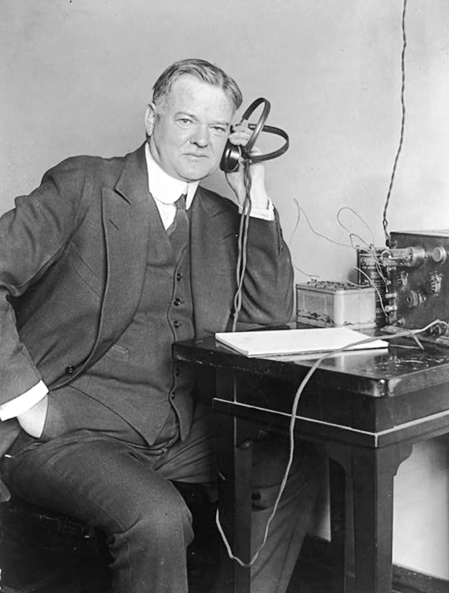
Herbert Hoover listening to a radio receiver

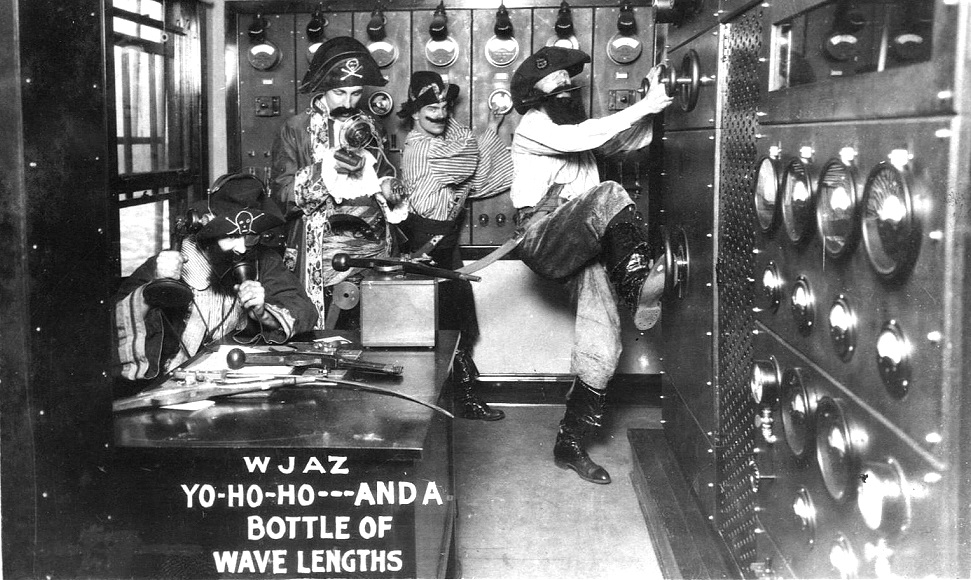
In 1926, Chicago radio station WJAZ successfully challenged the extent of Commerce's authority under the Radio Act of 1912.

Until the passage of the Radio Act of 1912, radio transmissions (generally known as "wireless telegraphy") in the United States were largely unregulated. Radio at this time was almost exclusively employed for maritime use, so regulatory responsibility was assigned to Commerce's Bureau of Navigation.

When Hoover joined the department, almost no families had radio receivers. The early 1920s saw the rapid rise of broadcasting, to over 500 stations by the end of 1922. To receive advice on this innovation, Hoover called a series of four annual conferences, beginning with one held from February 27 to March 2, 1922. Attendees at the first conference included: Dr. S. W. Stratton, chairman (Director of Bureau of Standards), Edwin H. Armstrong, Columbia University, Capt. Samuel W. Bryant, U.S.N., Navy Department, Dr. Alfred N. Goldsmith, secretary Institute of Radio Engineers, Prof. L. A. Hazeltine, Stevens Institute of Technology, R. B. Howell, Metropolitan Utilities District, Omaha, Nebraska, Hiram Percy Maxim, president American Radio Relay League, Maj. Gen. George O. Squier, War Department, and representative Wallace H. White, jr., of Maine.

A common theme at all four conferences was the need for clearer authority to regulate radio. However, Hoover's attempts at stronger regulating were not supported by all congressional representatives, and he received much opposition from the Senate and from radio station owners. In the summer of 1926, the federal government's authority to assign station frequencies and powers was successfully challenged by a Chicago station, WJAZ. A chaotic period followed, until the situation was stabilized by the passage of the Radio Act of 1927, which transferred radio regulation to the newly formed Federal Radio Commission (FRC). This new agency required stations to demonstrate that they met a "convenience, interest, and necessity" standard. The original idea was that the FRC would function for one year, after which regulation would return to Commerce. However, reauthorizations of the FRC were made until its replacement by the Federal Communications Commission in 1934.

==== Travel ====
Hoover was also influential in the early development of air travel, and he sought to create a thriving private industry boosted by indirect government subsidies. He encouraged the development of emergency landing fields, required all runways to be equipped with lights and radio beams, and encouraged farmers to make use of planes for crop dusting. He also established the federal government's power to inspect planes and license pilots, setting a precedent for the later Federal Aviation Administration.

==== Standardization of hardware, toolmaking, manufacturing, housing and related industries ====
In his memoirs, Hoover describes the effort the Department took towards standardizing various products:

we induced the automobile manufacturers to reduce the varieties and dimensions of wheels on export cars to a small number, uniform for all makes, and the tire manufacturers similarly to reduce the number of their sizes and coordinate them with the wheels. The tire manufacturers were induced to appoint an agency in every center of the world so that all American cars could always be serviced. In addition, we aided the manufacturers to establish convenient supplies of spare parts of all American cars. The double effect of these simplifications and availabilities to the consumer was greatly to increase the foreign sales of both cars and tires. Our action helped to raise the American car to its dominant position in world trade. Another example was the effect of screw-thread uniformity. Ultimately any American bolt, nipple, or pipe would screw together with any other of the same caliber by any other American manufacturer. Every British or German manufacturer had his own dimensions, and foreign customers could not use those of any other manufacturer. In consequence, the foreigners ‘"bought American,” As another example of these efforts, through our committees American electric light bulbs had been standardized so that any size bulb would fit the same socket. This at once gave American equipment and bulbs an advantage abroad. The group of ingenious young men in the Department invented a thousand other devices and stratagems.

During Hoover's tenure they later attempted standardizing the housing market with the expansion of zoning laws, under the campaign promise "Better Homes"

The building codes in our towns and cities had been largely dominated by contractors and labor organizations who greatly and unnecessarily increased costs. We called a national conference of public officials and technical experts to consider the question. In my Annual Report to Congress for 1922 I indicated the beginnings of this work:

Systematic measures of co-operation have been set in motion by the appointment of a committee to formulate a standard building code ... as varying regulations in force in hundreds of different municipalities . . . imposed an unnecessary cost upon building of from 10 to 20 per cent. ... A tentative draft was submitted to some 975 engineers, architects, municipal officials, and representatives of the building industry, whose useful criticisms were incorporated.

Finally, a standard code was formulated. We put on a campaign for its adoption and secured its acceptance in several hundred municipalities. We inaugurated nation-wide zoning to protect home owners from business and factory encroachment into residential areas. We called a national conference of experts who drafted sample municipal codes for this purpose. When we started, there were only 48 municipalities with zoning laws; by 1928 there were 640.

==== Other Hoover initiatives ====
With the goal of encouraging wise business investments, Hoover made the Commerce Department a clearinghouse of information. He recruited numerous academics from various fields and tasked them with publishing reports on different aspects of the economy, including steel production and films. Other efforts at eliminating waste included reducing labor losses from trade disputes and seasonal fluctuations, reducing industrial losses from accident and injury, and reducing the amount of crude oil spilled during extraction and shipping. He promoted international trade by opening overseas offices to advise businessmen. Hoover was especially eager to promote Hollywood films overseas.

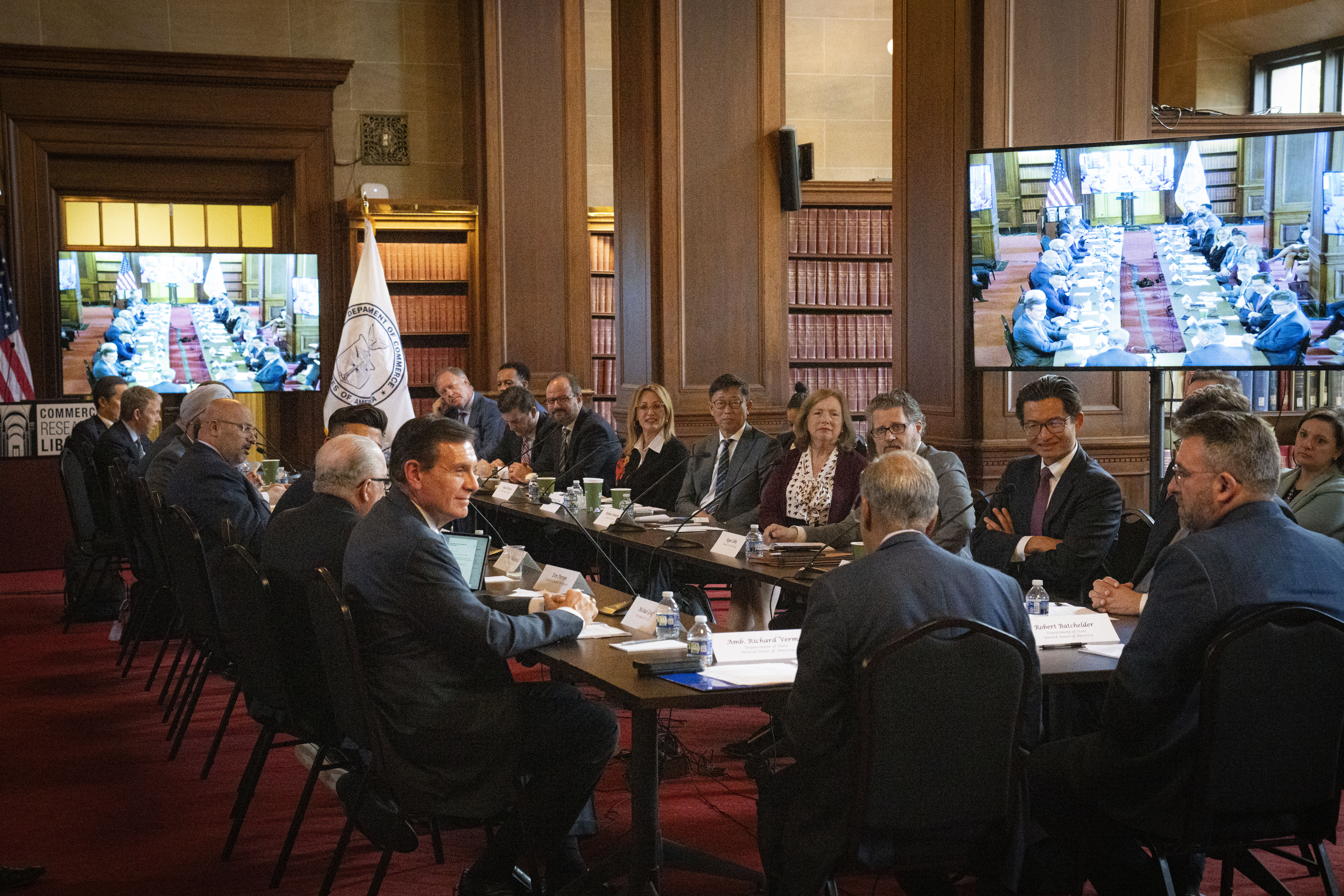
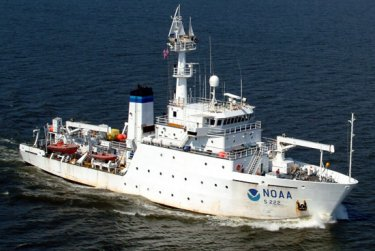
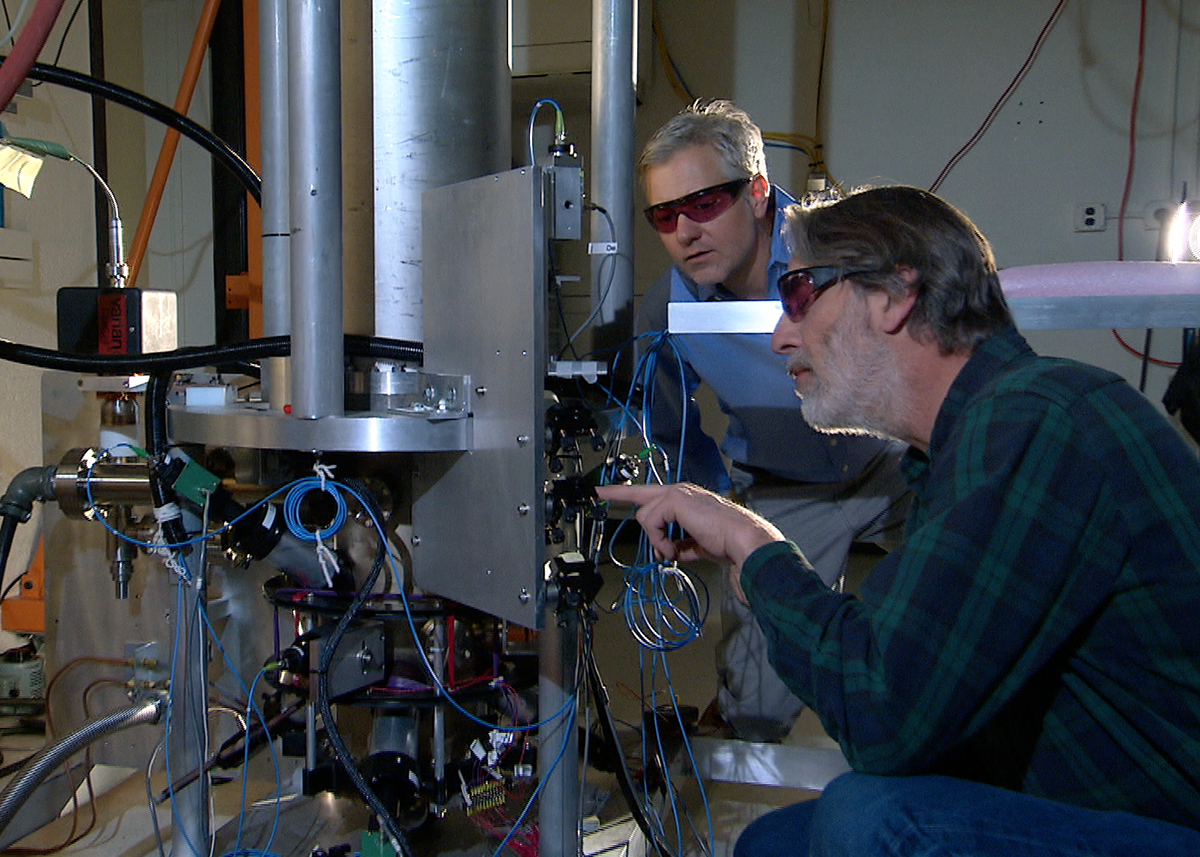
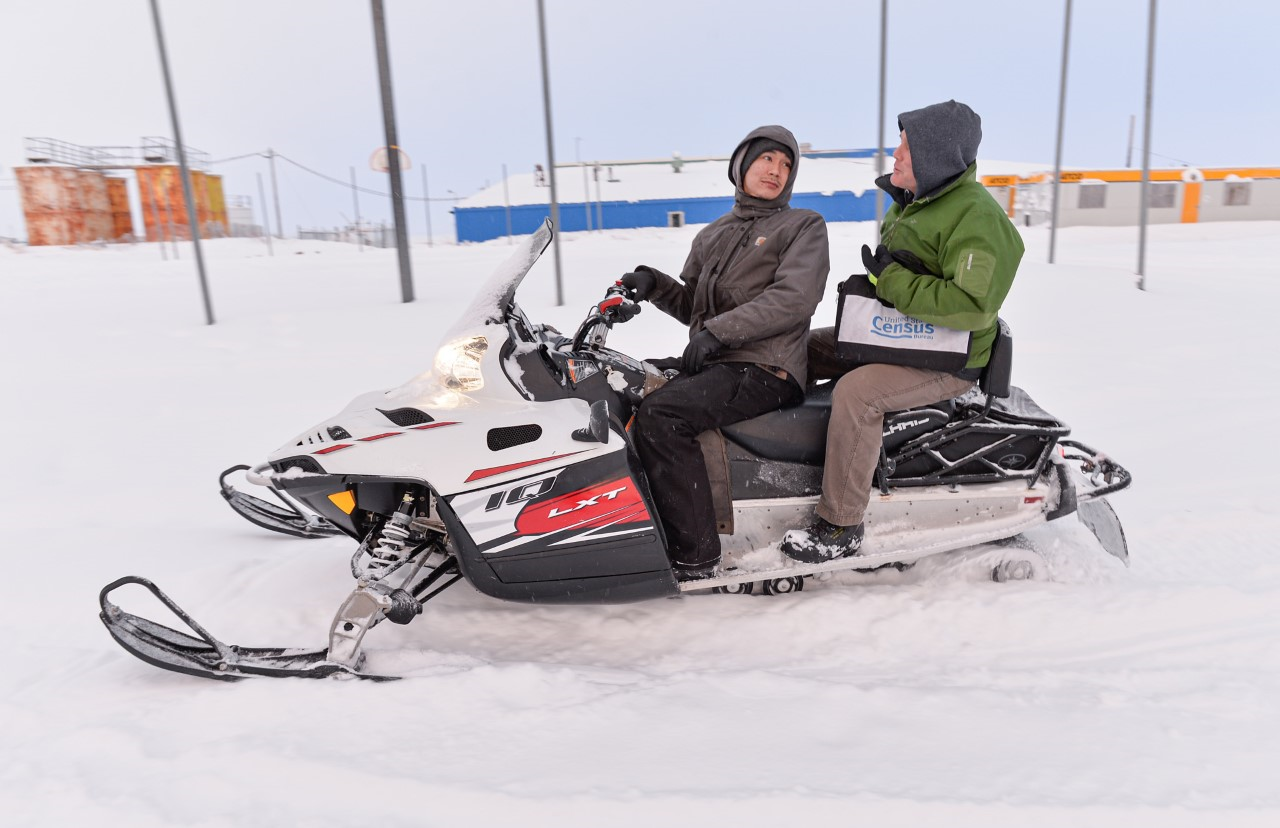
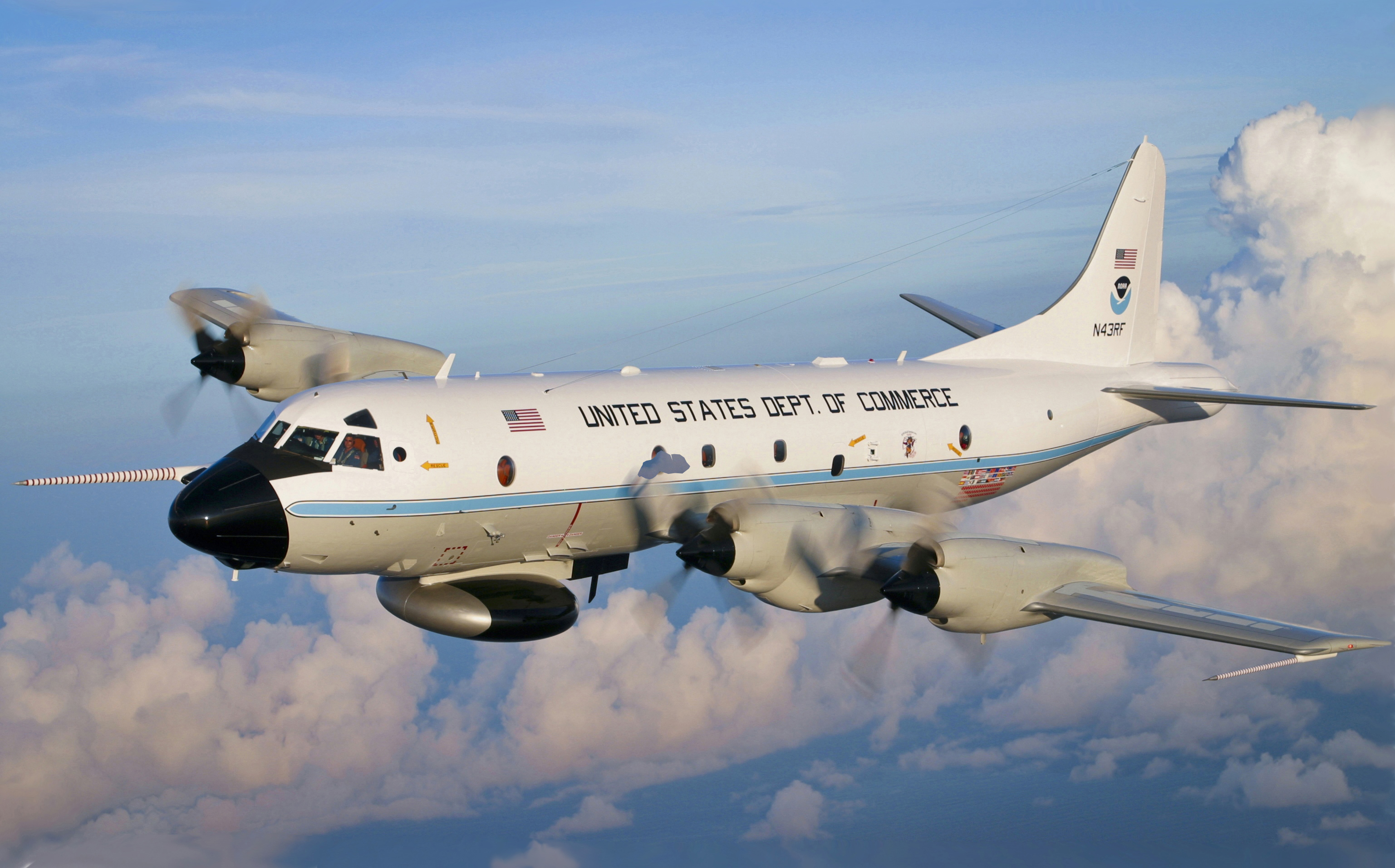
The Department of Commerce fulfills a variety of missions. Clockwise, from top left: the department-sponsored U.S. Investment Advisory Council meets at the Hoover Building in 2023; the NOAAS Thomas Jefferson underway in the early 2000s; NIST scientists maintain the United States' cesium fountain atomic clock; a Census Bureau enumerators collect data in Alaska in 2000; a NOAA Lockheed WP-3D Orion aircraft pictured in 2008.

He worked with bankers and the savings and loan industry to promote the new long-term home mortgage, which dramatically stimulated home construction. Other accomplishments included winning the agreement of U.S. Steel to adopt an eight-hour workday, and the fostering of the Colorado River Compact, a water rights compact among Southwestern states.

Most famously during Hoover's tenure the traffic light colors were standardized nationally and under an approved list of manufacturers which included stop signs, pedestrian signs, bus stops dimensions, and most other signage a driver would expect to see commonly.

=== Foreign economic policy ===
The department has always been involved in promoting international non-financial business. It stations commercial attachés at embassies around the world. Currently, the key sub-agencies are the International Trade Administration, and the Bureau of Industry and Security. The ITA provides technical expertise to numerous American companies, helping them adjust to foreign specifications. It provides guidance and marketing data as well. The Office of Export Enforcement administers export controls, especially regarding the spread of nuclear technology and highly advanced electronic technology. Under the administration of President Donald Trump, the policy has been to restrict high-technology flows to China. From 1949 to 1994, the department worked with the 17-nation Coordinating Committee on Multilateral Export Controls, which restricted technological flows to the Soviet Union and other communist nations. Since 1980, the Commerce Department works to neutralize the dumping of exports or the subsidies of overseas production. Along with the export controls, this work continues to generate friction with other nations. On July 20, 2020, the commerce department announced adding eleven Chinese firms to an export blacklist for committing human rights abuse against Uyghur Muslims and other ethnic minorities in Xinjiang by conducting genetic analysis on them. Two of the firms sanctioned were subsidiaries of BGI Group, a Chinese genetic sequencing, and biomedical firm. In the same year October, the BGI Group firm was again named in the alleged exploitation of medical samples of patients testing for COVID-19 in Nevada using the 200,000 rapid testing kits donated by the United Arab Emirates under its AI and cloud computing firm, Group 42. The Emirati firm, also known as G42, has previously been named in the mass surveillance of people via an instant messaging application called ToTok, which was actually a spy application snooping on user data.

== Organization ==
Department of Commerce facilities in the Washington metropolitan area

=== Facilities ===
The Department of Commerce was initially headquartered in the Willard Building at 513-515 14th Street (not to be confused with the Willard Hotel on Pennsylvania Avenue). This site is now occupied by the Hotel Washington, completed in 1918. Between 1913 and 1932, the department was located in the Commerce Building at 19th Street and Pennsylvania Avenue, NW. In 1932, following completion of construction of the Herbert Hoover Building, the department relocated to the new facility, where it remains as of 2025.

=== Leadership ===
The department is headed by the Secretary of Commerce, a member of the president's cabinet and the tenth in line to succession to the U.S. presidency. In the event of the death, resignation, vacancy, or incapacity of the secretary, the following officials succeed to the office of secretary on an acting basis until the president appoints another person as acting secretary, or the vacancy is remedied through a permanent appointment by the president with the advice and consent of the United States Senate:

1. Deputy Secretary of Commerce
2. General Counsel of the Department of Commerce
3. Under Secretary of Commerce for International Trade
4. Under Secretary of Commerce for Economic Affairs
5. Under Secretary of Commerce for Standards and Technology
6. Under Secretary of Commerce for Oceans and Atmosphere
7. Under Secretary of Commerce for Export Administration
8. Chief Financial Officer of the Department of Commerce
9. Site Manager of the NIST Boulder Laboratories

=== Operating units ===
Program
Secretary of Commerce (Deputy Secretary of Commerce)	Economic Development Administration
Secretary of Commerce (Deputy Secretary of Commerce)	National Telecommunications and Information Administration
Secretary of Commerce (Deputy Secretary of Commerce)	Office of Business Liaison
Secretary of Commerce (Deputy Secretary of Commerce)	Office of the Chief Financial Officer and Assistant Secretary for Administration
Secretary of Commerce (Deputy Secretary of Commerce)	Office of the Chief Information Officer
Secretary of Commerce (Deputy Secretary of Commerce)	Office of Executive Secretariat
Secretary of Commerce (Deputy Secretary of Commerce)	Office of the General Counsel
Secretary of Commerce (Deputy Secretary of Commerce)	Office of Inspector General
Secretary of Commerce (Deputy Secretary of Commerce)	Office of Legislative and Intergovernmental Affairs
Secretary of Commerce (Deputy Secretary of Commerce)	Office of Policy and Strategic Planning
Secretary of Commerce (Deputy Secretary of Commerce)	Office of Public Affairs
Secretary of Commerce (Deputy Secretary of Commerce)	Office of Security
Secretary of Commerce (Deputy Secretary of Commerce)	Office of Space Commerce
Secretary of Commerce (Deputy Secretary of Commerce)	Office of White House Liaison
Under Secretary of Commerce for Economic Affairs	Bureau of the Census
Under Secretary of Commerce for Economic Affairs	Bureau of Economic Analysis
Under Secretary of Commerce for Industry and Security	Bureau of Industry and Security
Under Secretary of Commerce for Industry and Security	Office of Export Enforcement
Under Secretary of Commerce for Intellectual Property	Patent and Trademark Office
Under Secretary of Commerce for International Trade	International Trade Administration
Under Secretary of Commerce for International Trade	United States Commercial Service
Under Secretary of Commerce for Oceans and Atmosphere	National Marine Fisheries Service
Under Secretary of Commerce for Oceans and Atmosphere	National Oceanic and Atmospheric Administration
Under Secretary of Commerce for Oceans and Atmosphere	National Oceanic and Atmospheric Administration Commissioned Corps
Under Secretary of Commerce for Oceans and Atmosphere	National Ocean Service
Under Secretary of Commerce for Oceans and Atmosphere	National Weather Service
Under Secretary of Commerce for Oceans and Atmosphere	Office of Oceanic and Atmospheric Research
Under Secretary of Commerce for Standards and Technology	National Institute of Standards and Technology
Under Secretary of Commerce for Standards and Technology	National Technical Information Service
Under Secretary of Commerce for Minority Business Development	Minority Business Development Agency

== Reorganization proposals ==
Proposals to reorganize the department go back many decades. The Department of Commerce was one of three departments that Texas governor Rick Perry advocated eliminating during his 2012 presidential campaign, along with the Department of Education and Department of Energy. Perry's campaign cited the frequency with which agencies had historically been moved into and out of the department and its lack of a coherent focus, and advocated moving its vital programs into other departments such as the Department of the Interior, Department of Labor, and Department of the Treasury. The Economic Development Administration would be eliminated.

On January 13, 2012, President Barack Obama announced his intentions to ask the United States Congress for the power to close the department and replace it with a new cabinet-level agency focused on trade and exports. The new agency would include the Office of the United States Trade Representative, currently part of the Executive Office of the President, as well as the Export-Import Bank of the United States, the Overseas Private Investment Corporation, the United States Trade and Development Agency, and the Small Business Administration, which are all currently independent agencies. The Obama administration projected that the reorganization would save $3 billion and would help the administration's goal of doubling U.S. exports in five years. The new agency would be organized around four "pillars": a technology and innovation office including the United States Patent and Trademark Office and the National Institute of Standards and Technology; a statistical division including the United States Census Bureau and other data-collection agencies currently in the Commerce Department, and also the Bureau of Labor Statistics which would be transferred from the Department of Labor; a trade and investment policy office; and a small business development office. The National Oceanic and Atmospheric Administration (NOAA) would be transferred from the Department of Commerce into the Department of the Interior. Later that year, shortly before the 2012 presidential election, Obama invoked the idea of a "secretary of business" in reference to the plan. The reorganization was part of a larger proposal which would grant the president the authority to propose mergers of federal agencies, which would then be subject to an up-or-down Congressional vote. This ability had existed from the Great Depression until the Reagan presidency, when Congress rescinded the authority.

The Obama administration plan faced criticism for some of its elements. Some Congress members expressed concern that the Office of the United States Trade Representative would lose focus if it were included in a larger bureaucracy, especially given its status as an "honest broker" between other agencies, which tend to advocate for specific points of view. The overall plan has also been criticized as an attempt to create an agency similar to Japan's powerful Ministry of International Trade and Industry, which was abolished in 2001 after some of its initiatives failed and it became seen as a hindrance to growth. NOAA's climate and terrestrial operations and fisheries and endangered species programs would be expected to integrate well with agencies already in the Interior Department, such as the United States Geological Survey and the United States Fish and Wildlife Service. However, environmental groups such as the Natural Resources Defense Council feared that the reorganization could distract the agency from its mission of protecting the nation's oceans and ecosystems. The plan was reiterated in the Obama administration's FY2016 budget proposal that was released in February 2015.

== See also ==
- Bureau of Industry and Security
- Commerce Department trade mission controversy
- Title 13 of the Code of Federal Regulations
- Title 15 of the Code of Federal Regulations
- Title 19 of the Code of Federal Regulations
- USA.gov
