= Paycheck Protection Program =

U.S. federal government business loan program

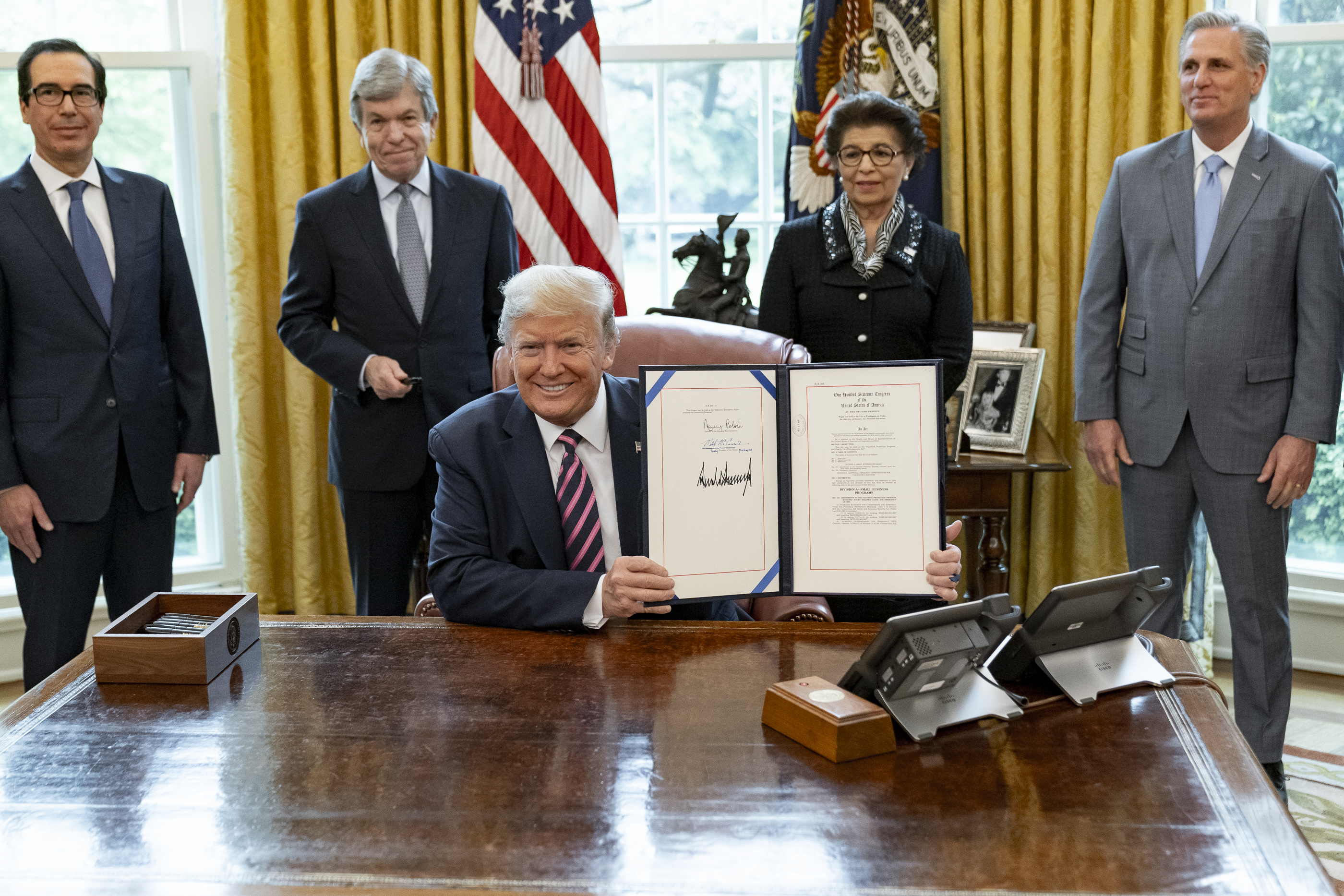
President Trump signs the Paycheck Protection Program and Health Care Enhancement Act (H.R. 266), April 24, 2020

The Paycheck Protection Program (PPP) was a $953-billion business loan program established by the United States federal government by the 116th United States Congress during the Trump administration in 2020 through the Coronavirus Aid, Relief, and Economic Security Act (CARES Act) to help certain businesses, self-employed workers, sole proprietors, certain nonprofit organizations, and tribal businesses continue paying their workers.

The Paycheck Protection Program allowed entities to apply for low-interest private loans to pay for payroll and certain other costs. A PPP loan allowed a business applicant to receive funds up to 2.5 times the applicant's average monthly payroll costs. Sometimes, an applicant may have received a second draw typically equal to the first. The loan proceeded to cover payroll costs, rent, interest, and utilities. The loan could be partially or fully forgiven if the business kept its employee counts and employee wages stable. The U.S. Small Business Administration implemented the program. The deadline to apply for a PPP loan was March 31, 2021.

Some economists have found that the PPP did not save as many jobs as purported and aided too many businesses that were not at risk of going under. They noted that other programs, such as unemployment insurance, food assistance, and aid to state and local governments, would have been more efficient at strengthening the economy. The program was criticized for its exorbitant cost, costing approximately $169k – $258k per job saved, and that the majority of benefits flowed to small-business owners, their creditors and their suppliers rather than to workers. It is estimated that only 25% of the funding allocated went to jobs that would have been lost. Supporters of the program note that the PPP functioned well to prevent business closures and cannot be measured on the number of jobs saved alone. By one estimate, the PPP reduced mortgage delinquencies by $36 billion in 2020.

== Overview ==
The purpose of the Paycheck Protection Program and loan forgiveness was to provide economic relief to small businesses and certain other entities that were adversely impacted by the COVID-19 pandemic.

According to a 2022 study, the PPP:

cumulatively preserved between 2 and 3 million job-years of employment over 14 months at a cost of $169K to $258K per job-year retained. These numbers imply that only 23 to 34 percent of PPP dollars went directly to workers who would otherwise have lost jobs; the balance flowed to business owners and shareholders, including creditors and suppliers of PPP-receiving firms. Program incidence was ultimately highly regressive, with about three-quarters of PPP funds accruing to the top quintile of households. PPP's breakneck scale-up, its high cost per job saved, and its regressive incidence have a common origin: PPP was essentially untargeted because the United States lacked the administrative infrastructure to do otherwise. Harnessing modern administrative systems, other high-income countries were able to better target pandemic business aid to firms in financial distress. Building similar capacity in the U.S. would enable improved targeting when the next pandemic or other large-scale economic emergency inevitably arises.

== Provisions ==
=== Eligibility ===
President Joe Biden visiting the W. S. Jenks & Son hardware store in Washington, D.C., which received a PPP loan (transcript)

In order to be eligible for the Paycheck Protection Program, an applicant had be a small business, sole proprietor, independent contractor, self-employed person, 501(c)(3) nonprofit organization, (Note: In the case of a church, a temple, a mosque, a synagogue, another house of worship, an integrated auxiliary of churches, or a convention or association of churches that is not required to apply for a determination of its 501(c)(3) status, the organization is eligible as long as it meets the requirements of Section 501(c)(3) and all other PPP requirements.) (Note: A hospital that is tax-exempt under Section 115 of the Internal Revenue Code qualify as a nonprofit organization if it maintains written documentation that it has reasonably determined that it is described in section 501(c)(3) of the Internal Revenue Code and is therefore within a category of organization that is exempt from taxation under section 501(a).) (Note: 501(c)(12) electric cooperatives and 501(c)(12) telephone cooperatives are also eligible.) (Note: 26 U.S.C. § 508(c)(1)(A)) 501(c)(19) veterans organization, or a tribal business. (Note: A tribal business is a business that is wholly owned by one or more Indian tribal governments or by a corporation that is wholly owned by one or more Indian tribal governments. Being partially owned by one or more Indian tribal governments also qualifies if all other owners of the business are either United States citizens or small businesses.) Effective December 27, 2020, certain 501(c)(6) organizations became eligible. (Note: A 501(c)(6) organization became eligible if it was not a private club; it had fewer than 300 employees; its lobbying activities generated no more than 15% of its receipts; its lobbying costs were no more than $1 million during its most recent tax year ending on or before February 15, 2020; lobbying activities were not more than 15% of its total activities; promoting or participating in a political campaign was not the organization's purpose; and it was not a professional sports league.) Effective March 11, 2021, 501(c)(2), 501(c)(5), 501(c)(7), 501(c)(8), 501(c)(10), and 501(c)(13) organizations became eligible unless they were a private club.

Applicants who operated as a sole proprietorship, an independent contractor, or an eligible self-employed individual must have been in operation on February 15, 2020. Other types of applicants must have been in operation on February 15, 2020, (Note: A seasonal business is eligible to apply for a PPP loan if it was in operation on February 15, 2020, or it was in operation for at least eight weeks between February 15, 2019, and June 30, 2019.) and must have either had paid employees or paid independent contractors.

The applicant and its affiliates (Note: According to the Small Business Administration, affiliation is generally determined based on ownership, management, interest, and other circumstances. Two entities are affiliates if one entity owns at least 50 percent of the other. Two entities are also affiliates of each other if one controls — or has the power to control — the other. Two entities are also affiliates of each other if another entity controls, or has the power to control, them both. Having the power to control does not necessarily imply that the power is actually exercised. If an external party has at least 50 percent ownership, it has the power to control. The power to control may also exist by way of contractual agreement.) (Note: A faith-based organization may disregard the number of employees of its affiliates if the connection between the two organizations is based on a religious teaching, religious belief, or is otherwise a part of the exercise of religion. The affiliation rules do apply, however, if the affiliation is solely for non-religious reasons, such as administrative convenience. The application should include a written statement explaining the reason the applicant believes it qualifies for the affiliation exception.) (Note: Affiliation rules are waived for businesses in the hotel and food services industries, franchises in the Small Business Administration's Franchise Directory, and businesses that receive financial assistance from small business investment companies licensed by the Small Business Administration.) also needed to:

- have 500 or fewer employees worldwide, including its U.S. and foreign affiliates; (Note: Count all employees regardless of work location. A business that is in either the accommodation or food services industries and has more than one physical location, however, qualifies if it employs fewer than 500 per location.) (Note: A business that received applied for a PPP loan before May 5 will not be subject to penalties for interpreting the 500-employee threshold for only counting its employees in the United States. Businesses that receive PPP loans on or after May 5 must count all employees worldwide for purposes of the 500-employee threshold.) (Note: Colleges and universities do not need to count student workers if the student works as part of either a Federal Work-Study Program or a substantially similar program of a state or municipality.) (Note: 26 CFR 1.121-1(b)(2) may be used to determine an employee's primary place of residence.) or
- meet the Small Business Administration's industry size standards based on average number of employees. (Note: Number of employees is determined by counting all paid employees, whether employed on a full-time, part-time, or seasonal basis; leased from a temporary employee agency or a professional employer organization. Count all paid employees as whole employees. Volunteers who receive no pay for their services are excluded from the number of employees.) (Note: The average number of employees is equal to the average of the number of employees for each payroll between January 1, 2019, and December 31, 2019. If the applicant began its operations after January 1, 2019, it averages the number of employees in each pay period that it operated between January 1, 2019, and December 31, 2019.) (Note: Small business revenue standards are not used for qualification of PPP loans.) (Note: 13 CFR 121.106(b)(4)) (Note: 13 CFR 121.106(a)) or
- have a tangible net worth (Note: Tangible net worth equals total assets, less intangible assets, less liabilities.) that did not exceed $15 million on March 27, 2020, and an average net income that did not exceed $5 million for the two full fiscal years prior the date of the PPP application.

The applicant had to be located in the United States or its possessions. The applicant's primary operations had to be located in the United States or its possessions or, alternatively, the applicant's business must have made a significant contribution to the economy of the United States.

An applicant was ineligible for a PPP loan if:

- it engaged in any activity deemed illegal under federal, state, or local law; (Note: Such as selling medical marijuana) (Note: 13 CFR 120.110(h)) or
- it was a household employer, such as an individual employing nannies, housekeepers, or other household employees; (Note: 13 CFR 120.100) or
- it was a passive business, such as a hedge fund or a private equity firm; or
- it was in bankruptcy proceedings at the time of application or before the loan proceeds were disbursed; or
- it was a public hospital that received 50% or more of its funding from state- or local-government sources, excluding Medicaid; or
- an owner of 20% or more of the business was incarcerated; or
- an owner of 20% or more of the business was subject to an indictment, criminal information, arraignment, or other means by which formal criminal charges for felony offenses are brought in any jurisdiction; or had been convicted of a felony within the preceding year; (Note: Five years in the case of fraud, bribery, embezzlement, a false statement on a loan application, or a false statement on an application for federal assistance.) or
- an owner of 20% or more of the business was on either probation or parole, which began within the preceding five years for a felony involving fraud, bribery, embezzlement, or a false statement in a loan application or an application for federal financial assistance, and within the preceding one year for other felonies; or
- the applicant, the business's owners, or any business owned or controlled by the applicant or the business's owners had ever obtained a direct or guaranteed loan from any federal agency that was delinquent or had defaulted within the preceding seven years and caused a loss to the federal government; or
- the business was owned in whole or in part by an undocumented alien. (Note: 13 CFR 120.110(e))

An applicant was not required to demonstrate that it could not find credit elsewhere, but it was required to certify, in good faith, that economic uncertainty made the loan request "necessary to support the ongoing operations of the applicant".

Each business could receive one PPP loan with up to two draws. (Note: In the case of entities that are exempt from the affiliation rules, each affiliate may apply and receive a separate PPP loan, each of which may be up to $10 million.)

=== Loan amount ===
The amount of the PPP loan was based on the applicant's payroll costs.

Payroll costs included salaries, wages, commissions, cash tips, paid leave, (Note: Payroll costs exclude Emergency Paid Sick Leave and Emergency Paid Family Leave under the Families First Coronavirus Response Act.) severance pay, clergy parsonage and housing allowance, and other compensation paid to employees. These costs were limited to $100,000 annualized per employee. Payroll costs also included group health benefits, and insurance and retirement benefits. Payroll costs included taxes withheld from employees' wages and all state and local taxes assessed on compensation, but did not include the employer's portion of social security tax, the employer's portion of Medicare tax, or federal unemployment tax. In the case of a sole proprietor, independent contractor, or self-employed person, payroll costs included net profits from self-employment, based on the 2019 Form 1040 Schedule C line 31, and were limited to $100,000 annualized.

Payroll costs did not include payments to workers whose primary residence was outside the United States. (Note: Workers who are U.S. permanent residents count as having their primary residence in the United States. Workers with a non-immigrant status, such as J-1 or H-2A, do not count as having their primary residence in the United States.) Payroll costs also did not include payments to non-employees of the applicant. (Note: A fishing boat owner's payroll costs are allowed to include payments to each crewmember whose compensation is reported in Box 5 of Form 1099-MISC, as long as the crewmember does not receive a PPP loan in their own right.)

In order to calculate the amount of the PPP loan, the applicant calculated its payroll costs between January 1, 2019, and December 31, 2019. (Note: An applicant may choose to use its payroll costs for the previous 12 calendar months instead. Businesses not in business on February 15, 2019, may use the period from January 1, 2020, to February 29, 2020. Seasonal businesses may choose to use the period from February 15, 2019, to June 30, 2019; or from March 1, 2019, to June 30, 2019; or from May 1, 2019, to September 15, 2019.) Average monthly payroll costs were calculated by dividing this amount by 12.

The PPP loan amount was equal to 2.5 times the average monthly payroll costs. For applicants with an Economic Injury Disaster Loan (EIDL) made between January 31, 2020, and April 3, 2020, the PPP loan amount could be increased by the outstanding amount of the EIDL, less any advance received under a COVID-19 EIDL.

Each PPP loan could not exceed $10 million. In some cases, however, each affiliate of a company was allowed to apply and receive its own PPP loan. On April 24, NBC reported that there were at least eight cases where a company and its affiliates had received PPP loans, and half of them had received more than $20 million in total.

A borrower that accidentally made an error in its PPP loan application that resulted in larger PPP loan amount could take actions to correct the error. (Note: A borrower must not request PPP loan forgiveness for excess loan proceeds. If the error was discovered before sending the PPP forgiveness application to the Small Business Administration, the lender needs to tell the Small Business Administration that it should deny forgiveness for the excess amount. If the PPP loan forgiveness application was already sent to the Small Business Administration, the lender must request its withdrawal through the Paycheck Protection Platform, correct the error, and then resend. If the Small Business Administration has already approved PPP loan forgiveness and has sent payment to the lender, the lender must notify both the borrower and the Small Business Administration through the SBA Paycheck Protection Platform.)

=== Application process ===
Applicants applied for a PPP loan directly with an eligible private lender, such as a federally insured bank, a federally insured credit union (Note: 12 U.S.C. § 1751), Farm Credit System institution, or a Small Business Administration-approved lender.

The Small Business Administration had a standard application form, although private lenders were allowed to use their own paper forms or electronic forms if they were substantially similar to the standard form. Applicants had to attach documentation to support the amount of the loan applied for, such as payroll reports, payroll tax filings, Form 1099-MISC, or a sole proprietor's income and expenses. If these records were unavailable, a lender could accept bank records if they sufficiently demonstrate the qualifying amount.

Applicants had to make certain assertions, including that economic uncertainty made the loan request "necessary to support the ongoing operations of the applicant". While a lender did not need to require a business to demonstrate the basis of its certification, the Small Business Administration could do so. The Small Business Administration did not believe that a publicly traded business with substantial market value and access to capital markets could make that certification in good faith. An applicant that, together with its affiliates, received PPP loans totaling $2 million or more, should have retained documentation of the basis on which it made this certification.

Applying for a PPP loan was free to the applicant. Applicants were not charged any application fees by either the private lender or the federal government. The Small Business Administration compensated lenders for processing PPP loans. Certified Public Accountants and accounting firms were not allowed to charge businesses to prepare their applications for PPP loans; instead, the lender was permitted to, and may have, compensated them directly. Nevertheless, an accounting firm was allowed to charge a business for providing advice on which loan program and tax relief program would have been best for their business.

Some lenders only accepted PPP applications from businesses that already had a depository account with the lender. (Note: Examples: "COVID-19 Customer Assistance for SBA & CARES Act Loans". TD Bank. "At this time, TD Bank is only accepting applications from Existing TD Business Customers. Customers must have a deposit account at TD Bank to receive funding."; "Coronavirus (COVID-19): Supporting Small Business When It Matters Most". Citibank. "We are starting to accept applications for the Small Business Administration's Paycheck Protection Program. To manage volumes, at this time, we will be reaching out to existing Citi Small Business Banking clients in phases."; "We're here for our small business clients". Bank of America. "To be eligible, you must have a Small Business lending and Small Business checking relationship with Bank of America as of February 15, 2020, or a Small Business checking account opened no later than February 15, 2020, and do not have a business credit or borrowing relationship with another bank."; "Business Customers: Paycheck Protection Program updates for business customers". Capital One Bank. "Please note that business customers who apply for a Paycheck Protection Program Loan through Capital One must have an active business checking account as of February 15, 2020."; "COVID-19 Update: Small Business Administration Paycheck Protection Program". Wells Fargo. "Who is eligible? ... Have a Wells Fargo business checking account as of February 15, 2020")

Loan applications were only accepted, and loans could only be made, through August 8, 2020.

Making a false statement to obtain a PPP loan was a crime subject to possible imprisonment, fines, or both. (Note: 18 U.S.C. § 1001) (Note: 18 U.S.C. § 3571) (Note: 15 U.S.C. § 645)

Applications for PPP loans were accepted, approved, and disbursed in the order of first-come first-served, until the entire amount appropriated by Congress was depleted. The first appropriation of $349 billion was depleted on April 16, 2020, and the Small Business Administration stopped accepting new applications from lenders as of that date. A bill to add $320 billion of funding was passed by the Senate and the House of Representatives on April 21 and April 23, respectively, and signed into law by President Trump on April 24. The Small Business Administration subsequently began accepting new applications from lenders on April 27.

The Equal Credit Opportunity Act required lenders to notify an applicant of a decision on their PPP loan application within 30 days (Note: The Equal Credit Opportunity Act's 30-day requirement applies only if the applicant is a business with gross revenues of $1 million or less in its preceding fiscal year. Otherwise, the lender must notify the applicant in a reasonable period of time.) of the date on which the lender received either a loan number or a response about the availability of funds from the Small Business Administration.

If a PPP loan application was incomplete, the Equal Credit Opportunity Act required the lender to notify the applicant of the issue, and the lender had to provide the applicant a period of time to make the application complete. A lender was allowed to deny an incomplete application only if the applicant did not make the application complete by the end of the time period provided by the lender. A lender was not allowed to deny a PPP loan application solely because the lender had not yet received a response from the Small Business Administration.

If a lender denied a PPP loan application, the Equal Credit Opportunity Act required the lender to provide an adverse action notice to the applicant with specific reasons for the denial, even if the application was denied before sending the application to the Small Business Administration.

=== Loan terms ===
The bill extended the deferral of principal and interest payments to the date that loan forgiveness was remitted to the lender or, if the borrower did not apply for loan forgiveness, ten months after the end of the covered period.

A business was not required to begin to pay any principal or interest to the lender until the date that the Small Business Administration disbursed the amount of loan forgiveness to the lender. If the business did not apply for loan forgiveness, then the business was not required to begin to pay principal or interest to the lender until ten months plus 24 weeks after the date the loan proceeds were disbursed to the business.

For PPP loans that the Small Business Administration approved on or after June 5, the PPP loan must have had a maturity of at least five years. For other PPP loans, the PPP loan had a maturity of two years; each lender had the option to extend the maturity of these PPP loans to a longer period.

PPP loans had an interest rate of 1 percent.

Each PPP loan was guaranteed by the Small Business Administration. An applicant did not need to provide any collateral or personal guarantees in order to apply or be approved for a PPP loan. A PPP loan was a non-recourse loan, unless the loan proceeds were used for unallowable purposes.

=== Allowable uses of loan proceeds ===
PPP loan proceeds could generally be used for payroll costs. Payroll costs included gross salary and wages, tips, vacation leave, sick leave, holiday pay, furlough pay, bonuses, severance pay, and other compensation paid to employees, up to $46,154 per employee. (Note: The limit is $15,385 per employee if using an 8-week covered period.) Payroll costs also included the employer's cost for health insurance benefits for its employees and retirement benefits for its employees, neither of which were counted against the $46,154 limit per employee. Employer-paid state taxes assessed on employee compensation, such as state unemployment tax, were allowable payroll costs. Emergency Paid Sick Leave and Emergency Family Medical Leave, the employer's portion of social security and Medicare taxes, and federal unemployment tax had to be excluded from payroll costs.

In the case of a sole proprietor, independent contractor, or self-employed person, allowable payroll costs included owner-compensation replacement, up to 15.38% of their net self-employment profit in 2019, (Note: Generally, net self-employment profit in 2019 is the amount on the person's Form 1040 Schedule C Line 31 for 2019.) up to a maximum of $20,833. (Note: The maximum is $15,385 if using an 8-week covered period.) Health insurance benefits and retirement benefits for an owner of the business were not allowable payroll costs.

PPP loan proceeds could also be used for certain non-payroll costs. Allowable non-payroll costs included business payments of mortgage interest, (Note: Mortgage interest payments are allowable and are eligible for forgiveness if the business mortgage was obligated prior to February 15, 2020. Mortgage interest payments to a related party are not eligible for forgiveness. Related parties are any two entities with any ownership in common.) (Note: If the business operates from an owned building on which it has a mortgage, mortgage interest is forgiveable up to the proportionate share of the fair-market value of the space that is not leased to other businesses.) (Note: Mortgage principal payments are not allowable.) other interest, (Note: Interest payments are allowable if the business loan was first made prior to February 15, 2020.) rent, (Note: Rent payments are allowable if the business lease was first obligated prior to February 15, 2020.) (Note: Rent paid to a related party is allowable if the business lease was first obligated prior to February 15, 2020. Allowable rent paid to a related party is eligible for forgiveness up to the amount of mortgage interest the related party owed on the property during the covered period that is attributable to the rented property. Related parties are any two entities with any ownership in common.) and utilities, such as electricity, gas, water, telephone, internet, and transportation utility fees assessed by state and local governments. (Note: Utilities are allowable if service began prior to February 15, 2020.) (Note: If the business operates from an owned building, utilities are forgiveable up to the proportionate share of the utilities of the space that is not leased to other businesses.) (Note: For a home-based business, rent, interest, and utilities are forgiveable up to the prorated share of covered expenses that were deductible on the business's tax return in 2019. A business that began in 2020 may use the amount expected to be deductible on the business's tax return in 2020.)

PPP loan proceeds could not be used to compensate outside independent contractors that provided services to the business, nor to compensate employees whose primary residence was not in the United States.

If the business operated internationally, PPP loan proceeds could only be used for the benefit of its operations in the United States and its possessions.

=== Loan forgiveness ===
==== Calculation for borrowers with employees ====
The principal of a PPP loan was either partially or fully forgiven under certain circumstances. A business could apply for loan forgiveness at any time on or before the maturity date of the loan, including before the covered period ended in the case of a business that had expended all of the PPP loan proceeds for which forgiveness was requested. (Note: Applying for loan forgiveness before the end of the covered period does not necessarily change the covered period.)

PPP loan forgiveness was generally based on what the loan proceeds were spent on, to what extent the business maintained or rehired its employees, and to what extent it maintained the wages and hours of its employees:

1. Take the business's average number of full-time equivalent (FTE) employees per month during the 24 weeks (Note: Instead of a 24-week period, a business may use any period length of at least 8 weeks and no more than 24 weeks long. (Note: The 24-week period cannot end any later than March 31, 2021.)) after the loan proceeds were disbursed, (Note: Any former employee who is rehired by April 27, 2020, counts as being employed the entire eight weeks.) (Note: Alternatively, a business that pays biweekly or more frequently may choose to begin the period on the first day of the first pay period after the day the loan proceeds were disbursed.) and divide it by the average number of FTEs per month between February 15, 2019, and December 31, 2019. (Note: Alternatively, the business may choose to divide by the average number of FTEs per month between January 1, 2020, and February 29, 2020. A seasonal business divides by the average number of FTEs per month between February 15, 2019, and on June 30, 2019.)
2. Multiply the above by the total amount paid for payroll costs, (Note: Wages, salaries, bonuses, vacation leave, sick leave, hazard pay, wages paid to furloughed employees, health benefits, group life insurance benefits, disability insurance benefits, retirement benefits are included in the definition of eligible payroll costs.) mortgage interest, (Note: Advance payments of mortgage interest are ineligible for loan forgiveness.) rent, (Note: Rent includes lease payments for real property (such as office space) and lease payments for personal property (such as equipment).) and utilities during the 24 weeks (Note: If the PPP loan was made before June 5, the business may choose to use an eight-week period instead.) after the loan proceeds were disbursed. (Note: A business that pays biweekly or more frequently may choose to use an alternative payroll covered period for payroll costs instead. The alternative payroll covered period begins on the first day of the first pay period beginning after the date the loan proceeds were received. The alternative payroll covered period does not apply to non-payroll costs.) (Note: Payroll costs are considered to be incurred on the day the employee's pay is earned, which is generally the day the employee worked. If an employee is paid but not performing work, payroll costs are incurred based on the business's schedule, which is generally each day the employee would have ordinarily performed work.) (Note: In order for a non-payroll cost to be eligible for loan forgiveness, the non-payroll cost must either be paid during the covered period or incurred during the period and paid by the next regular billing date, which is allowed to be after the covered period ends. Any non-payroll costs that are partially incurred during the covered period may be included in loan forgiveness only for the portion incurred during the covered period and paid by the next regular billing date.)
3. If, during the 24 weeks of the loan, the business reduced any employee's wages by more than 25% when compared to the previous calendar quarter, reduce the above amount by the amount of the reduction in wages. (Note: A business that received a PPP loan of $50,000 or less is not required to reduce PPP loan forgiveness due to reductions in full-time-equivalent employees or reductions in employees' salaries or wages.) (Note: A business may disregard wage reductions to any employee who received wages exceeding $100,000 annualized during any single pay period in 2019. A business may also disregard wage reductions if it eliminated the wage reduction by June 30, 2020.) (Note: A reduction in the employee's health insurance costs or retirement plan contributions do not cause any reduction in loan forgiveness.)

One FTE was equal to one worker who worked at least 40 hours per week. The FTE for someone who worked fewer than 40 hours per week was equal to the number of hours worked per week divided by 40. Alternatively, the business could choose to consider each and every worker who worked fewer than 40 hours per week to be 0.5 FTE each.

In an exception to the above, the business would not be required to reduce its PPP loan forgiveness due to a wage reduction or a decrease in FTEs in the following cases:

- The business received a PPP loan of $50,000 or less.
- The business made a good-faith, written offer to rehire a particular employee during the 24-week period, and the employee declined the offer. (Note: In these cases, the business must document these situations in writing and inform the applicable state unemployment insurance office within 30 days of the individual's rejection of the offer of employment, or else the exception does not apply.)
- An employee was fired for cause, voluntarily resigned, or voluntarily requested and received a reduction in work hours.
- The business rehired employees by December 31.
- The business restored wage or hour reductions by December 31.
- The business was unable to rehire its employees on February 15 and was also unable to hire similarly qualified employees by December 31.
- The business was unable to return to its previous level of business activity due to compliance with requirements or guidance from the Department of Health and Human Services, the Centers for Disease Control and Prevention, or the Occupational Safety and Health Administration between March 1 and December 31, involving COVID-19-related standards for worker safety or customer safety.

A business could receive loan forgiveness on all of its payroll costs. Additionally, it could receive forgiveness for a proportion of non-payroll costs up to 66.67% of the amount it spent on payroll costs. The total amount of loan forgiveness could not exceed the total amount of the PPP loan. The amount of loan proceeds used for unallowable purposes was ineligible for forgiveness. Knowingly using loan proceeds for unallowable purposes was fraud.

==== Calculation for self-employed individuals and owner-employees ====
If the PPP loan was made before June 5, 2020, and the borrower chose to use an 8-week covered period, then the maximum amount of loan forgiveness for compensation for self-employed individuals and owner-employees was equal to the lesser of 15.38% of their 2019 compensation or $15,385 per individual in total across all businesses. For other borrowers who were self-employed or owner-employees, the maximum amount of loan forgiveness for compensation for self-employed individuals and owner-employees was the lesser of 20.83% of 2019 compensation or $20,833 per individual in total across all businesses.

If the individual filed a Form 1040 Schedule C or Schedule F, then the maximum was further limited to the amount of their 2019 net profit on their Schedule C or Schedule F.

In the case of a general partner, the maximum was further limited to the amount of their 2019 net earnings from self-employment, less any claimed section 179 depreciation deduction, unreimbursed partnership expenses, and depletion from oil and gas properties, and then multiplied by 92.35%.

In the case of a self-employed individual, including a filer of either Form 1040 Schedule C or Schedule F and general partners, they could not claim loan forgiveness for retirement contributions and health insurance contributions separately because these costs were already included in their net self-employment income. If the borrower was a self-employed individual, additional loan forgiveness was not allowed for rent or mortgage interest.

The compensation of an owner-employee of at least 5% of the C corporation was allowable and limited to the amount of their 2019 employee cash compensation, employer retirement contributions on their behalf, and health insurance contributions on their behalf. For each of these owner-employees, health insurance benefits and retirement contributions were allowable costs and did not count against the maximum amount of loan forgiveness for compensation above.

For an owner-employee that owned more than 5% of either an S corporation or a C corporation, retirement plan contributions attributed to the owner were allowable and counted toward PPP loan forgiveness, up to 20.833% of the owner's retirement plan contribution amount in 2019.

The compensation of an owner-employee of an S corporation was limited to the amount of their 2019 cash compensation and employer retirement contributions on their behalf, but it could not separately include health insurance contributions made on their behalf because these contributions were already included in their cash compensation. For an owner-employee of a S corporation, health insurance benefits and retirement contributions were allowable costs but did count against the maximum amount of loan forgiveness for compensation above.

The above owner-employee compensation limits did not apply if the individual owned less than 5% of the S corporation or C corporation. In that case, owner-employee compensation were treated the same as any non-owner employee's compensation, and qualified for PPP loan forgiveness for up to $46,154 of compensation for a 24-week covered period as well as additional amounts for retirement plan expenses, health benefits paid for the owner-employee and their family, and state unemployment taxes on their compensation.

==== Application process ====
The business could use one of three PPP loan forgiveness applications, depending on their situation. (Note: All businesses may use SBA Form 3508. A business is eligible to use SBA Form 3508S instead if it meets all of the following criteria.: 1. The business received a PPP loan of $150,000 or less; 2. The dollar amount for which forgiveness is requested does not exceed the principal amount of the PPP loan; 3. The PPP loan proceeds were used to pay costs that are eligible for forgiveness (payroll costs to retain employees; business mortgage interest payments; business rent or lease payments; or business utility payments); 4. At least 60% of the forgiveness amount was used for payroll costs; 5. If the business used a 24-week covered period, the forgiveness amount does not exceed 2.5 months' worth of 2019 compensation for any owner-employee or self-employed individual/general partner, capped at $20,833 per worker; and; 6. If the business used an 8-week covered period, the forgiveness amount does not exceed 8 weeks' worth of 2019 compensation for any owner-employee or self-employed individual/general partner, capped at $15,385 per worker.; A businesses is eligible to use SBA Form 3508-EZ instead if it meets any of the following three criteria.: 1. It is a self-employed individual, an independent contractor, or a sole proprietor without any employees at the time it applied for the PPP loan; or; 2. It is an employer that did not reduce its number of full-time-equivalent employees (othjer than employees it was unable to rehire and unable to replace with similarly qualified employees), and it did not make a reduction of more than 25% to the pay of any employees who earned less than $100,000 annualized; or; 3. It is an employer that did not make a reduction of more than 25% to the pay of any employees who earned $100,000 annualized, and it was unable to operate at the same level as it had on February 15, 2020, because of COVID-19 health and safety restrictions imposed by federal agencies.) The business completed the PPP loan forgiveness application and gave it to the lender along with any required documentation.

At that point, the lender had 60 days to send a decision and a request for payment to the Small Business Administration. When the lender did so, the Small Business Administration had 90 days to remit the appropriate forgiveness amount to the lender, including accrued interest on that amount, subject to the Small Business Administration's review of the loan or the loan application. The business then had to pay any remaining principal and accrued interest to the lender by the end of the maturity of the PPP loan.

If the Small Business Administration determined that a business that received a PPP loan was ineligible for the PPP loan, the Small Business Administration may have had recourse against individual shareholders, members, or partners of the business for non-payment of the PPP loan, and the lender would have been required to repay the processing fee it had received from the Small Business Administration. A business would have been able to seek reconsideration and appeal of the Small Business Administration's decisions.

For those businesses that received PPP loans early in the process, eligibility for applying for loan forgiveness began as early as May 27, 2020, eight weeks after the first distributions of PPP loan proceeds.

On August 4, 2020, the Small Business Administration issued guidance to clarify the process for lenders to review forgiveness applications. The guidance addressed issues regarding the submission process; employee, independent contractor and sole proprietor compensation; non-payroll costs, and payroll cycle calculations. Borrowers could use scanned copies of paperwork in lieu of in-person meetings with lenders.

==== Record retention ====
Each business is required to retain documentation related to the PPP loan for a minimum of six years after the date on which its PPP loan was forgiven or the date the PPP loan was paid in full, whichever is later. The business must send the documentation to the Small Business Administration and its inspector general upon request. The Small Business Administration and its inspector general may review any PPP loan.

==== Income taxes ====
Ordinarily, loan forgiveness is considered taxable income, but forgiveness of a PPP loan was not considered taxable income. A business could take a tax deduction for business expenses that resulted in loan forgiveness.

==== Appeal process ====
A business could appeal the Small Business Administration's official written decisions regarding PPP loans and PPP loan forgiveness. Decisions made by a private lenders could not be appealed. A lender could not appeal the Small Business Administration's decisions. A business had to file a petition to appeal with the Office of Hearings and Appeals by 30 days after a borrower's receipt of the Small Business Administration's final PPP loan review decision or 30 days after the lender notified the business of the Small Business Administration's final PPP loan decision, whichever was earlier.

During the appeal, the business should have demonstrated that there was a clear error based on evidence. An administrative law judge or an administrative judge would decide whether there was a clear error of fact or law.

The judge could affirm the Small Business Administration's decision, deny the Small Business Administration's decision, or remand the matter back to the Small Business Administration for additional consideration. A judge would not reverse a decision by the Small Business Administration entirely because a different decision could have been made. The judge would generally make a decision within 45 calendar days. The judge's decision would generally be made publicly available unless the judge placed a protective order or the Small Business Administration approved the business's request to redact certain information.

A business could challenge a judge's decision within 10 days of receipt of the judge's initial decision. A business could also request a review by the Small Business Administration within 30 days of receipt of the decision. After exhausting administrative remedies, a business could request judicial review of the Small Business Administration's final decision in federal district court.

The business had to pay any attorney fees that it incurred related to the appeal process.

=== Second draws ===
Under certain circumstances, a business that received a PPP loan was allowed to receive additional loan proceeds by way of a second draw.

An entity was eligible for a second draw if all of the following criteria were true at the time of the application:

- It had received a first draw PPP loan, and it must have either fully spent the entire proceeds of the first draw or applied for forgiveness of the first draw.
- It had fewer than 300 employees.
- It had seen at least a 25% decrease in revenue for a calendar quarter in 2020 when compared to the corresponding calendar quarter in 2019.
- It had not received a Shuttered Venue Operators grant.
- It was not publicly traded.
- It was not primarily engaged in political activities, lobbying activities, promoting or participating in a political campaign, public policy advocacy, or political strategy, nor did it publicly describe itself as a think tank.
- It was not a 501(c)(6) professional sports league.
- It did not have 20% or more of its economic interests owned by an entity created in, or organized under, the laws of the People's Republic of China or Hong Kong, did not have significant operations in either of those locations, and did not have a board member who was a resident of the People's Republic of China.
- If applying for a second draw loan exceeding $150,000, it had already sent a completed loan forgiveness application to the lender. (Note: This is true even if the borrower requested no forgiveness at all of the loan.)

The amount of the second draw is equal to 2.5 times the entity's average monthly payroll costs during 2019. Alternatively, the business may elect to calculate the second draw based on the average monthly payroll costs of any 12-month period ending prior to the date of the loan. Businesses in the lodging or food accommodations industries could multiply their average monthly payroll costs by 3.5 rather than 2.5. In no case could a second draw exceed $2 million.

Second draw PPP loans generally had the same terms as the first draw PPP loans.

The deadline to apply was March 31, 2021.

== Legislative history ==
=== CARES Act ===
The Paycheck Protection Program was enacted as part of the Coronavirus Aid, Relief, and Economic Security Act (CARES Act). All of the Paycheck Protection Program's original $349 billion was allocated between April 3 and April 16, 2020. The Small Business Administration stopped accepting new PPP applications on April 16, 2020. $342.3 billion was for PPP loans, and $6.7 billion was for lender reimbursements for processing loan applications that were approved. (Note: Lenders receive payment on approved PPP loans based on the amount of the loan. Payment is 5 percent of loans of up to $350,000; 3 percent of loans of between $350,001 and $1,999,999; and 1% of loans between $2,000,000 and $10,000,000. Payment is disbursed to the bank within five days that the lender disbursed the loan proceeds to the business.) Between April 3 and April 16, 2020, there were 1.7 million loans made, and 4,975 lenders approved loans. The average loan amount was $206,000. Of all loans, 74% were for $150,000 or less. Businesses in the construction industry received 13.12% of the total of loan amounts, the largest percentage of any classification. The next four highest classifications were professional, scientific, and technical services with 12.65%; manufacturing with 11.96%; health care and social assistance with 11.65%; and accommodation and food services with 8.91%.

=== Paycheck Protection Program and Health Care Enhancement Act ===
On April 21 and 23, respectively, the Senate and House passed the Paycheck Protection Program and Health Care Enhancement Act to add $320 billion of funding to the PPP. President Trump signed the bill into law on April 24, 2020, which allowed the Small Business Administration to accept applications again on April 27.

=== Paycheck Protection Program Flexibility Act of 2020 ===
The Paycheck Protection Program Flexibility Act of 2020 (H.R. 7010) amended the Paycheck Protection Program. Loan forgiveness was expanded from eight weeks of eligible costs to 24 weeks or December 31, 2020, whichever is earlier; alternatively, a business whose PPP loan was made before June 5 may opt to use the eight-week period instead. PPP loans made on or after June 5 must have a minimum term of five years, rather than two years. At least 60% of the loan forgiveness amount must be for payroll costs, rather than 75%. The safe harbor provision that loan forgiveness would not decrease if the business rehired employees and restored wage reductions by June 30, was extended to December 31. Loan forgiveness would not decrease if the business was unable to rehire its employees on February 15 and was unable to hire similarly qualified employees by December 31. Loan forgiveness would not decrease if the business was unable to return to its previous level of business activity due to compliance with requirements or guidance from the Department of Health and Human Services, the Centers for Disease Control, or the Occupational Safety and Health Administration between March 1 and December 31, involving COVID-19-related standards for worker safety or customer safety. The deferral of principal and interest payments was extended to the date that loan forgiveness was remitted to the lender or, if the borrower did not apply for loan forgiveness, ten months after the end of the covered period. Employer payroll tax deferral was allowed even after loan forgiveness had been approved. PPP loan proceeds were required to be spent only on allowable costs during the eight- or 24-week covered period. Rep. Dean Phillips (D–MN) introduced the bill on May 26. The House of Representatives passed the bill by a vote of 417–1 on May 28. The Senate passed the bill by voice vote on June 3. President Trump signed the bill into law on June 5, 2020.

=== Deadline extension ===
On July 4, 2020, S. 4116 was passed, extending the application deadline from June 30 to August 8, 2020.

It was introduced on June 30 by Sen. Benjamin Cardin (D–MD), and the Senate unanimously passed it. The House of Representatives passed the bill by unanimous consent the following day. President Trump signed the bill into law on July 3. As of June 27, $519 billion had been allocated to PPP loans, and $140 billion remained available.

On March 30, 2021, President Biden signed a bill to extend the deadline to apply for a PPP loan to May 31, 2021. The bill also stated that the Small Business Administration would have 30 days from the application deadline to process PPP loan applications. As of March 30, 2021, $82 billion of unallocated funds remained.

=== Proposed amendments ===
Rep. Pramila Jayapal (D–WA) proposed the Paycheck Guarantee Act. Rather than having businesses take a private loan that may be forgiven after the fact under certain circumstances, the Treasury Department would reimburse businesses for employee salaries and benefits for three months or until consumer demand increases.

Rep. Nita Lowey (D–NY) introduced the Heroes Act, which would extend the period that PPP loans could be made from June 30 to December 31, 2020. It would expand loan forgiveness from eight weeks of eligible costs to 24 weeks or December 31, 2020, whichever was earlier. The bill would include eligible interest costs in the debt forgiveness calculation. It would lift the requirement that at least 75% of the loan forgiveness amount must be for payroll costs. Employers would be allowed to use PPP loan proceeds for personal protective equipment and other safety items for its employees, and those costs would be part of loan forgiveness. Each local television, radio, and newspaper company would be eligible to apply separately, rather than together as an affiliated group, if they were otherwise eligible. It would expand eligibility from 501(c)(3) and 501(c)(19) nonprofit organizations to all nonprofit organizations that are tax exempt under Section 501(c), although certain politically active 501(c)(4) organizations would be ineligible and compensation of registered lobbyist employees would not be allowable payroll costs. PPP loans would have a minimum term of five years, rather than two years, allowing businesses additional time to repay the loan. It would make a business ineligible for a PPP loan if an owner had been convicted of a felony for financial fraud or deception within the preceding five years. The bill was passed by the House of Representatives in a vote of 208–199.

The Prioritized Paycheck Protection Program Act would allow some businesses to be eligible for a second PPP loan. Eligibility would be limited to self-employed individuals and businesses with 100 or fewer employees, and who had experienced a greater than a 50% decrease in revenue compared to a recent quarter. Publicly traded companies would not be eligible for a second PPP loan. Businesses with multiple locations in the hospitality and lodging industries would have a limit of $2 million for all locations. A portion of the appropriation would be for businesses with fewer than 10 employees, and businesses in underserved and rural communities. On June 18, Sens. Benjamin Cardin (D–MD), Chris Coons (D–DE), and Jeanne Shaheen (D–NH) introduced the Prioritized Paycheck Protection Program Act in the Senate, and Reps. Angie Craig (D–MN) and Antonio Delgado (D–NY) introduced the bill in the House of Representatives.

In June 2020, U.S. Senators Rob Portman (R–OH), Ben Cardin (D–MD), James Lankford (R–OK), and Cory Booker (D–NJ) introduced the PPP Second Chance Act to allow people with criminal records to apply for PPP loans for their small businesses. Under existing PPP rules, the business owner could not have been convicted of a felony within the preceding year.

Senators Marco Rubio (R–FL) and Susan Collins (R–ME) introduced the Continuing Small Business Recovery and Paycheck Protection Program Act on July 27. Under the Act, a business would be eligible for another PPP loan under certain circumstances. The business would need to demonstrate that it had experienced at least a 50% decrease in gross receipts either between January 1 and March 31 or between April 1 and June 30, 2020, compared to the same days in 2019. The borrower would need to employ no more than 300 employees or meet certain alternative size standards. The second PPP loan would be limited to $2,000,000, and the total amount of PPP and other SBA loans received could not exceed $10,000,000 during the previous 90 days. Publicly traded businesses and businesses incorporated in, affiliated with, or with certain ties to the People's Republic of China would not be eligible for a second PPP loan. Businesses in bankruptcy would be eligible only under certain circumstances. For each new PPP loan, the Small Business Administration would pay each lender an amount equal to 3% of the first $350,000 plus 1% of the amount exceeding $350,000. Businesses with PPP loans of less than $150,000 would be able to attest to compliance with PPP loan regulations in order to receive full loan forgiveness. Other businesses that receive PPP loans of up to $2,000,000 would be able to apply for loan forgiveness by certifying they have documentation of their forgiveness eligibility and would retain this for three years after applying for loan forgiveness. All businesses would be able to use existing and new PPP loan proceeds for software, cloud computing costs, human resources costs, and accounting costs; out-of-pocket costs from property damage related to public disturbances in 2020; supplies deemed essential to the business's operations and purchased based on contract made before February 15, 2020; personal protective equipment, and other costs so the business could adhere to the federal government's health and safety recommendations for coronavirus issued between March 1 and December 31, 2020. In addition, all group insurance costs would be considered eligible payroll costs. It would also expand eligibility for PPP loans to 501(c)(6) nonprofit organizations and destination marketing organizations that employ 300 or fewer employees, that do not receive more than 10% of their revenue from lobbying activities, whose lobbying activities do not consist of more than 10% of their activities overall, that are not professional football leagues, and whose purpose is not to promote or participate in political campaigns. The Act would require a business to disclose to the Small Business Administration if a controlling interest in the business is held by the President, the Vice President, an Executive department head, a member of Congress, or their families. The Act would also appropriate an additional $190 billion for PPP loans.

=== Consolidated Appropriations Act, 2021 ===
On December 21, 2020, the House and the Senate passed the Consolidated Appropriations Act, 2021, which included $284 billion in forgivable loans to small businesses via the Paycheck Protection Program.

The Act restarted the period to apply for PPP loans, added $284.5 billion in funding for PPP loans, and it allowed certain entities to apply for a second draw of a PPP loan. The Act also opened eligibility to certain 501(c)(6) nonprofit organizations.

The Act added to the types of allowable expenses of PPP loan proceeds. Allowable expenses now included operating expenses, defined as business software or cloud-computing service that helps business operations; product delivery; service delivery; payroll; human resources; sales; billing; or accounting or tracking of supplies, inventory, records, and expenses. Allowable expenses also included out-of-pocket costs from property damage, vandalism, or looting resulting from public disturbances that occurred in 2020 that were not otherwise covered from other sources. Allowable expenses also included expenses to protect workers, such as air pressure ventilation systems, filtration systems, physical barriers to ensure social distancing, a drive-through window, an expansion of business space, health screening, the purchase of personal protective equipment, or any other expenditures to adapt the entities' activities in order to comply with government-issued COVID-19 safety guidelines. Allowable expenses also included the cost of essential supplies for the business's operating activities, made pursuant to a contract in effect prior to the beginning of the loan period. (Note: In the case of perishable goods, the contract must have been in effect either before or during the loan period.)

The Act stated that entities that received a PPP loan of less than $150,000, rather than $50,000, would be eligible to use a simplified one-page loan forgiveness application.

The Act expanded the definition of allowable payroll costs to employer-sponsored group life insurance benefits, group disability insurance benefits, group vision insurance benefits, and group dental insurance benefits.

=== PPP Extension Act of 2021 ===
On March 11, 2021, the H.R. 1799 PPP Extension Act of 2021 bill was introduced in the House of Representatives during the 117th Congress. The bill extended the covered period of the Paycheck Protection Program from March 31, 2021, to June 30, 2021 by amending the Small Business Act and CARES Act. It passed the House on March 16, 2021 in a bipartisan vote (415–3). It passed the Senate on March 25, 2021, also in a bipartisan vote (92–7). The following day on March 26, it was signed into law by President Joe Biden.

=== PPP and Bank Fraud Enforcement Harmonization Act of 2022 ===
On August 5, 2022, President Joe Biden signed the PPP and Bank Fraud Enforcement Harmonization Act of 2022 (Public Law 117–166), which established a 10-year statute of limitations for both criminal charges and civil enforcement actions involving fraud related to Paycheck Protection Program loans, including actions brought under the False Claims Act.

== Criticism of recipients ==
By June, 4.5 million businesses had received over $500 billion of taxpayer money, but the exact identities of the recipients were unknown, as Treasury Secretary Steve Mnuchin said that this was "proprietary" and "confidential." Additionally, although the Government Accountability Office had requested information about the loans for oversight purposes, the Small Business Administration was withholding the information.

On June 11, Steve Mnuchin told the Senate Committee on Small Business and Entrepreneurship that PPP loan recipients' names and loan amounts were confidential and would not be publicly released. Eight days later, the Small Business Administration and the Department of the Treasury said that it would release the names, addresses, and other information about recipients of PPP loans exceeding $150,000 each. Each recipient would be listed with a dollar range of the loan amount. PPP loans of $150,000 and below would be disclosed in the aggregate. On July 6, the Department of Treasury posted the data to its website.

A lawsuit was filed by several press organizations within the United States District Court for the District of Columbia in May 2020 seeking exact details of the PPP loan applicants beyond the information posted by the Small Business Administration. In November 2020, Judge James E. Boasberg ordered a preliminary injunction in favor of the press, requiring the SBA to publish the full names, addresses, and precise loan amounts of the PPP recipients by November 19, 2020. The data was released to the public on December 1, 2020. According to data from November 2020, 87% of PPP loans were for less than $150,000.

Racial disparities have been reported among recipients. In July 2020, a National Geographic article, citing the Center for Responsible Lending, reported that 95% of Black-owned businesses and 91% of Latino-owned businesses were unlikely to receive loans because they were very small businesses with few employees and because they did not have existing relationships with banks. The article also said that 41% of Black-owned businesses had already closed permanently, while only 17% of White-owned businesses met this fate.

At least 100 PPP loans were made to businesses without business names.

The first round of the PPP allocated $349 billion in funds to small businesses and other eligible borrowers, and the second round allocated another $310 billion. While the first round of the PPP was exhausted quickly generating controversy, the second round was not over-subscribed.

=== Loans made to politicians and their families ===
Some PPP loans were received by businesses owned or run by members of Congress or their spouses. On June 16, Politico reported that this included Reps. Susie Lee (D–NV), Debbie Mucarsel-Powell (D–FL), Roger Williams (R–TX), and Vicky Hartzler (R–MO). Three weeks prior, Dean Phillips (D–MN) had introduced legislation to require public release of the names of many of the recipients of PPP loans, but enough Republicans voted against it that the bill did not pass. Lee and Mucarsel-Powell had voted in favor of public disclosures, while Williams and Hartzler had voted against public disclosures. Ordinarily, an application for a Small Business Administration loan by a business owned or run by a member of Congress or their immediate family must be reviewed by the Standards of Conduct Commissions before the loan may be approved, but the Small Business Administration had waived that requirement for all PPP loans on April 13.

Rep. Ayanna Pressley (D-MA) reported receiving PPP loans in her 2020 Financial Disclosure Report.

The parents of White House Press Secretary Kayleigh McEnany received $1–2 million for their business, McEnany Roofing, which has 141 employees. The press secretary told Fox News in April 2020 that most loans had gone to "companies with 10 or fewer employees. That is what this program is designed to do, that is who it is helping."

Businesses with addresses at properties owned by President Trump and advisor Jared Kushner received at least 25 PPP loans totaling over $3.65 million. Of these businesses, 15 reported having no more than one employee each, or they did not self-report how many employees they had. Triomphe Restaurant Corp., at the Trump International Hotel and Tower in New York City, received a PPP loan of $2,164,543, and it reported having zero employees. The business later closed.

=== Loans made to churches ===
LifeWay Christian Resources surveyed Protestant pastors and found that 40% said their church had applied for government assistance through the CARES Act or through the Small Business Administration, and, of those who applied, 59% said they had been approved. The Diocesan Fiscal Management Conference estimated that 9,000 Catholic parishes had received PPP loans, roughly half of the Catholic parishes in the country. Jon Costas wrote in Christianity Today that churches should consider the "socio-economic and social justice issues" of applying for PPP loans, and whether following the rules for the loan proceeds are consistent with religious texts. Through June 30, 2020, over 88,000 loans totaling $7.3 billion were approved to churches. At least 60 churches in Texas received over $1 million each. They included Lakewood Church, a Houston megachurch led by televangelist Joel Osteen, which received $4.4 million; the Archdiocese of Galveston-Houston, which received about $4 million; and the Catholic Charities of the Archdiocese, which received about $4.5 million. A Florida-based company called ASLAN International Ministry received $8.4 million; it appeared that the company never did anything religious, and it was subsequently revealed as no longer maintaining a website nor a physical address.

=== Loans made to anti-vaccination organizations ===
A total of $850,000 in loans was granted to some of the country's most prominent anti-vaccination groups. While vaccines are generally considered safe and effective, the groups had been spreading misinformation and conspiracy theories that increase vaccine hesitancy, especially in the context on COVID-19.

The Center for Countering Digital Hate identified PPP loans made to the National Vaccine Information Center, to Joseph Mercola's online business group, to the Informed Consent Action Network, as well as to Robert F. Kennedy Jr.'s Children's Health Defense.

The Tenpenny Integrative Medical Center, which is the osteopathy clinic of anti-vaccination activist Sherri Tenpenny, received a $72,000 loan.

=== Loans made to publicly traded companies ===
Between April 3 and April 14, PPP loans included at least 94 loans made to publicly traded companies or their subsidiaries, totaling $365 million.

On April 23, the Small Business Administration released guidance stating that it is unlikely that a publicly traded business with substantial market value and access to capital markets would be eligible for a PPP loan. Such a business would not be able to certify in good faith that the PPP loan is necessary to support its ongoing operations because of the current economic uncertainty. While a lender does not need to require a business to demonstrate the basis in its certification, the Small Business Administration may do so. The Small Business Administration said it would not pursue action against any such business that applied for a PPP loan prior to April 23 and repays the loan proceeds by May 7, later extended to May 14 and then extended again to May 18. On April 28, the guidance was extended to businesses owned by private companies with similar situations.

Several businesses, including Potbelly, Ruth's Hospitality Group, Shake Shack, Nathan's Famous, and the Los Angeles Lakers, decided to repay the loan proceeds. Chembio Diagnostics, a publicly traded company, received a $3 million PPP loan that it said it would use to increase its capacity to provide infectious-disease tests, including COVID-19 tests, due to increased demand. On May 4, The New York Times reported that publicly traded companies had returned at least $375 million in PPP loans, based on securities filings and public announcements.

=== Loans made to investment consulting firms ===
Several of the largest investment consulting firms in the United States received large PPP loans despite questions as to whether the funds were needed. In June 2020, Reuters published an article detailing these practices, calling particular attention to the firm, RVK, Inc. The firm claimed to advise on more than $1 trillion in assets, yet it accepted a PPP loan of more than $2 million. According to Reuters, the firm's President, James Voytko, "said in an e-mail that RVK had followed program guidelines and maintained staffing levels, though he declined to answer written questions about the extent to which the coronavirus pandemic had impacted the company's finances." He further confirmed that "almost all of RVK's revenue comes from fixed annual retainer fees." In other words, declines in the market value of client assets would have little effect on RVK's revenue. Additionally, as recently as October 29, 2022, RVK described the firm as a "growing firm" in a job posting for its investment analyst position. It remains unclear whether the loan was necessary, but according to SBA records as of April 5, 2023, RVK had not yet repaid the loan in full.

It is notable that RVK, Inc. was also previously found guilty by the World Intellectual Property Organization for engaging in reverse domain name hijacking in an attempt to falsely claim ownership of the domain rvk.com without paying the market price. RVK, Inc. has also come under scrutiny for allegedly failing to promptly notify at least one of its clients after its networks were compromised by a hacker in March 2022. The hacker allegedly used RVK's client information to defraud the Central Bank of Chile.

=== Loans made to other entities ===
On April 28, Treasury Secretary Steven Mnuchin said that the Small Business Administration would do a "full review" of each PPP loan exceeding $2 million. Mnuchin warned that businesses would held be "criminally liable" if they receive a loan exceeding $2 million and do not follow the rules.

On May 13, the Small Business Administration said that any business that, together with its affiliates, received a total of less than $2 million of PPP loan proceeds, will be assumed to have made the good-faith certification of need in good faith. If the Small Business Administration determined that a business "lacked an adequate basis" for certifying the necessity of the PPP loan, the Small Business Administration would request that the business repay the outstanding PPP loan balance, and the business will become ineligible for PPP loan forgiveness. If the business subsequently repaid the loan, no further enforcement action would be taken on the matter.

On May 5, the Small Business Administration said that PPP loans received by nonprofit organizations are not considered federal financial assistance, are not subject to audit requirements under Uniform Guidance, and need not be included in the organization's Schedule of Expenditures of Federal Awards.

At least one of the people involved in the 2021 United States Capitol attack received a PPP loan. Richard Barnett received a $9,300 PPP loan on April 14, 2020.

A 38-year-old man in Irvine, California, had falsely claimed to be operating four businesses and had received about $5 million which he allegedly used to buy luxury cars.

== Oversight ==
Acting Pentagon Inspector General Glenn Fine was named the chair of the committee that oversees how the PPP loans were administered as well as the rest of the funding from the CARES Act. On April 7, 2020, four days after PPP loans began to be made, President Donald Trump removed Fine as head of the committee.

=== Report from SBA Inspector General ===
Hannibal Ware, the Inspector General of the Small Business Administration, said that the Small Business Administration had set stricter rules than were stated in the law establishing the program, which is causing an "unintended burden" on businesses.

The Small Business Administration required that 75% of a PPP loan be used for payroll costs, which is a rule not found in the law. The Small Business Administration stated all PPP loans would have a maturity date of two years, while the law allowed for up to ten years. The Small Business Administration has also not complied with all of the requirements stated in the law. The law required the Small Business Administration to issue guidance to lenders about the loan deferment process, but it did not do so. The law required lenders to prioritize businesses in underserved and rural areas, but the Small Business Administration did not issue any such guidance to lenders. The law required the Small Business Administration to register each PPP loan using the Taxpayer Identification Number of each business within 15 days after each loan was made, but it did not do so.

A group of software and information technology companies sued the Small Business Administration and the Department of the Treasury, alleging that the two agencies had improperly added restrictions to the program that were not present in the original law.

A lobbyist for the Independent Community Bankers of America has said that virtually all business owners took such a loan assuming it would be forgiven, but the rules are highly complex and all the rules have not yet been released for loans that have already been made. The American Bankers Association urged the federal government to release the forgiveness rules urgently.

=== Report from Government Accountability Office ===
On June 25, 2020, the Government Accountability Office released its first bimonthly report of its oversight of the Paycheck Protection Program, as required by the Coronavirus Aid, Relief, and Economic Security Act.

The report showed that, while the Small Business Administration had worked quickly to implement the PPP, the urgency caused confusion throughout the implementation of the PPP. Examples of ongoing confusion regarding the PPP included questions about who was eligible to apply for a PPP loan, the release of many unclear interim rules, the frequent release of numerous incomplete answers to questions, and a lack of clarity about how PPP loan proceeds must be used in order to qualify for loan forgiveness. The confusion added to the economic stress that employees were already experiencing from the pandemic.

Some small businesses were concerned that a government agency would later cite them for certifying their need for the loan without good faith. Small businesses were also uncertain whether they would qualify for any loan forgiveness. These uncertainties caused many small businesses to decide to return their loan proceeds rather than face these possible consequences. As of May 31, 2020, businesses had returned more than 170,000 PPP loans, totaling approximately $38.5 billion, largely resulting from many confusing statements, a lack of clarity, and confusing information released by the Small Business Administration.

The report found that the PPP loan application process allowed small businesses to self-certify their needs and qualifications. Consequently, some applicants were able to exploit the program by illegitimately inflating their payroll costs to qualify for larger PPP loans, misrepresenting their number of employees to illegitimately appear eligible for a PPP loan, and certifying that the loan proceeds would be used for allowable costs while actually using the loan proceeds for personal uses.

The Government Accountability Office's report said that the Small Business Administration still had not explained how it would conduct the reviews of PPP loans that exceeded $2 million each, nor had it explained how it would perform oversight of PPP loans that were smaller than that threshold.

=== Memo from Office of Management and Budget ===
On June 18, 2020, the Office of Management and Budget issued a memo regarding the interaction between PPP loans and federal awards. In the case of an organization that has received a federal award and has also received a PPP loan, the organization may use PPP loan proceeds to pay for payroll costs as long as it does not charge the same payroll costs to a federal award. Furthermore, the organization must utilize the PPP loan proceeds first in order to sustain its workforce, and the organization should take steps to preserve federal funds for restarting work on the federally funded project.

=== Loan necessity questionnaires ===
In late October 2020, the Small Business Administration created a nine-page loan necessity questionnaire for entities that received PPP loans of $2 million or more. The questionnaires ask about the entity's quarterly revenue, its capital expenditures, its dividend payments, whether it paid $250,000 or more of annualized compensation to any employee during the 24-week covered period, and to what extent its operations were altered due to COVID-19. In the version for non-profit organizations, the questionnaire asks about the organization's endowments. Nonprofit schools had to provide information about their revenue from tuition. Some of the responses required information that could only have been obtained after the entity had already certified its need for the loan on its PPP loan application.

As part of the PPP loan forgiveness process, the Small Business Administration said it would send the questionnaire to the lender of each entity that received a PPP loan of $2 million or more. Within five business days, the lender must send the questionnaire to the applicable entity with a notification that Small Business Administration has undertaken a review of its PPP loan. After receiving the questionnaire from the lender, the entity would have ten business days to complete and return the questionnaire to the lender.

The Small Business Administration said it would use the completed questionnaires to assess to what extent the entity was truthful in its good-faith certification in its loan application that the PPP loan was necessary for ongoing operations due to economic uncertainty. The Small Business Administration may determine an entity was ineligible for a PPP loan and pursue repayment or other remedies if the entity does not complete and return the questionnaire.

The completed questionnaires are not necessarily exempt from the Freedom of Information Act. The questionnaires ask the entity to indicate which parts of the completed form contain confidential or proprietary information, which might possibly prevent public release of the information under FOIA Exemption 4, which states that "trade secrets" and matters that are "commercial or financial information obtained from a person" that are "privileged or confidential". (Note: 5 U.S.C. § 552(b)(4))

The Small Business Administration estimated that 42,000 for-profit entities and 10,000 non-profit organizations would receive questionnaires.

== Fraud ==
Initially, the U.S. Department of Justice charged more than 500 people with illegally claiming PPP loans, collectively totaling hundreds of millions of dollars. By April of 2024, those numbers rose to over 3,500 defendants, over 400 civil lawsuits and $1.4 billion. David Staveley along with David A. Butziger were the first to be charged in connection defrauding the PPP in May 2020. In June 2021, one California couple was convicted for submitting about 150 fraudulent applications to fraudulently claim over $20 million. In January 2024, an Alabama woman was sentenced to 45 months in prison for bank fraud, making false statements to a federally insured bank, and money laundering after fraudulently receiving $610,000 in PPP funds. In 2023, 62 year old Dani Walker, living in Seattle, WA pled guilty to stealing nearly $500,000 from the program to, among other things, purchase a Jaguar coup with a faux diamond license plate cover, fund a $34,000 on a luxury vacation to New York including a Louis Vuitton shopping spree, and invest unsuccessfully in cryptocurrency. After being approached by the FBI, Walker continued her fraudulent scheme and continued to apply for PPP loans based on non-existent employees.

A 2021 working paper by three finance professors at the University of Texas at Austin estimated that about 15% of the program's loans, representing $76 billion (about 1.8 million loans out of the total of about 11.8 million loans), had at least one indicator of fraud. About 1.2 million loans (totaling $38 billion) had at least two indicators of fraud. The study identified four primary and five secondary indicators of a suspicious loan. The primary indicators were "non-registered businesses, multiple loans at a residential address, abnormally high implied compensation relative to industry by core-based statistical area (CBSA) averages, and large inconsistencies (as large as tenfold) between the jobs reported by borrowers on their PPP application and another contemporaneous government program application with a different incentive structure." The secondary indicators were "discontinuities around the maximum PPP compensation level of $100,000, rounded loan amounts, overrepresentation of PPP loans relative to U.S. Census data on the number of business entities in a particular industry and county, clustering of loans with similar features within lender-county pairs, and criminal records for PPP borrowers". The study found that financial technology (fintech) companies were far more likely to make suspicious PPP loans; fintech companies made about 29% of total PPP loans, but accounted for 52.63% of suspicious loans, and "FinTech loans are highly suspicious at a rate of almost five times that for traditional lenders."

A December 2022 report from the US House Select Subcommittee on the Coronavirus Crisis cited fintech firms and small business lenders, such as Blueacorn, Womply, Bluevine, and Kabbage, as among those that failed to help prevent fraudulent loans, which Insider suggested may jeopardize participation in future programs. The article cited Bloomberg News, reporting that estimated fintechs "handled only 15% of PPP loans overall but accounted for 75% of the fraudulent PPP loans investigated by the Justice Department."

== Ongoing Fraud Investigations and Enforcement ==
As of April 2024, the Department of Justice's COVID-19 Fraud Enforcement Task Force (CFETF) reported significant progress in combating fraud related to pandemic relief programs, including the Paycheck Protection Program. The task force's efforts have led to criminal charges against more than 3,500 defendants, involving losses exceeding $2 billion.
