= W. S. Jenks & Son =

Hardware store in Washington, D.C.

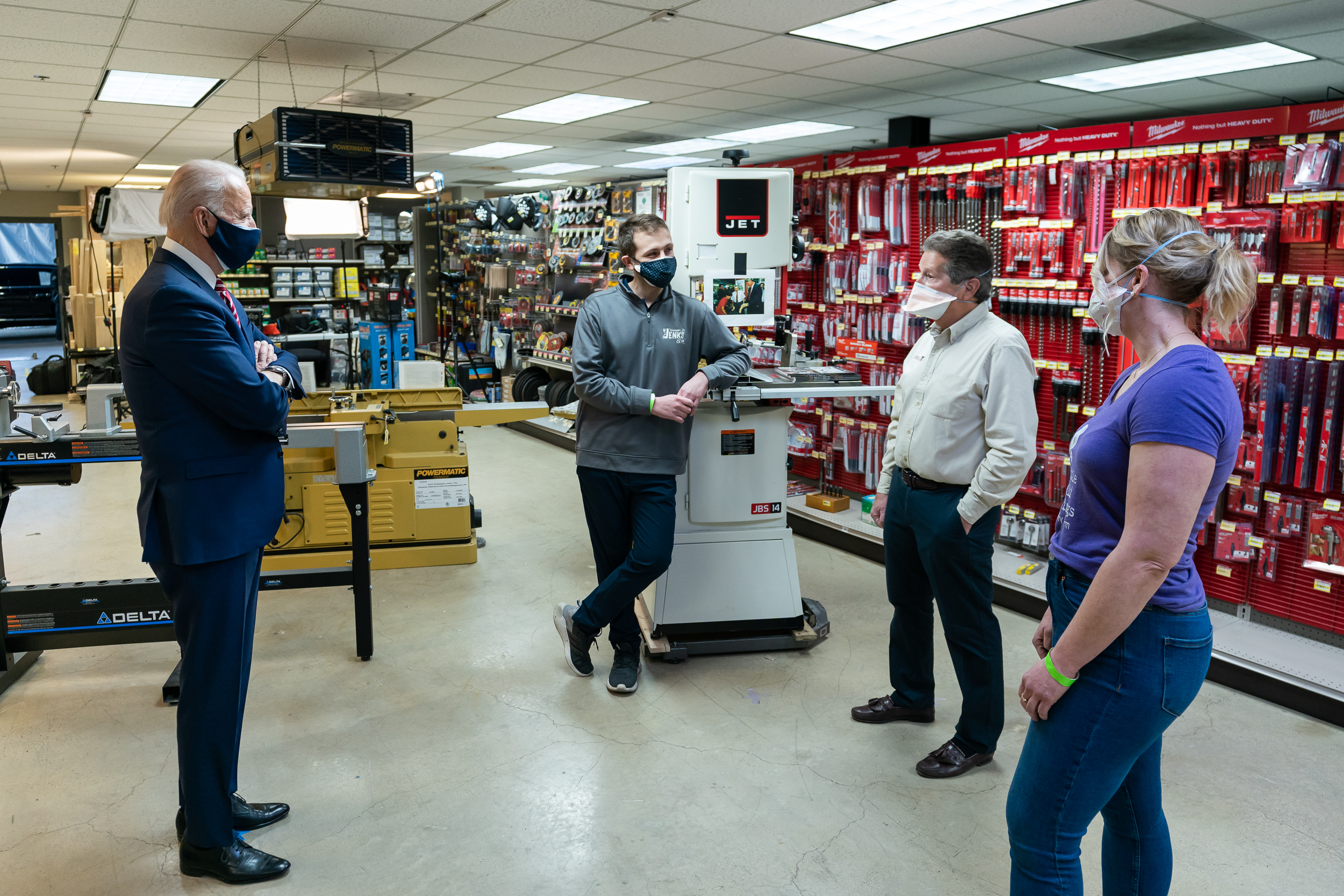
Joe Biden visiting W. S. Jenks & Son and speaking with the store's co-owners in 2021

W. S. Jenks & Son is a hardware store in Washington, D.C.

Opened in 1866, W. S. Jenks & Son is the oldest hardware store in Washington, D.C. It has been owned by the Siegel family since 1952, and has changed locations within Washington, D.C., in 1986, 2003, and 2014. The store has a history of selling products to the United States federal government, and was awarded a certificate for distinguished service for providing the government with materials during World War I. In 1993, U.S. president Bill Clinton and Small Business Administration administrator Erskine Bowles visited the store to give a talk about health care.

Company president Jerry Siegel has leased space in the building to two urban farms, Cultivate the City and Little Wild Things. Cultivate the City is situated on the store's roof while Little Wild Things is located within a repurposed garage. These farms increase traffic to the store and host various events and classes.

During the COVID-19 pandemic in the United States in 2021, W. S. Jenks & Son co-owners Jerry and Mike Siegel received a government loan under the Paycheck Protection Program. United States president Joe Biden visited and toured the store that year. He met with the store's co-owners as well as Mary Anna Ackley, the owner of Little Wild Things. Biden purchased a single pair of Stanley pliers at the store. The visit was Biden's first appearance with the White House press corps.
