= Economic Development Administration =

Agency in the US Department of Commerce concerned with poor communities

U.S. Economic Development Administration

Agency overview
- Formed: 1965
- Jurisdiction: Federal government of the United States
- Headquarters: Herbert C. Hoover Building 1401 Constitution Avenue NW Washington, D.C., U.S.
- Agency executive: Vacant, Assistant Secretary of Commerce for Economic Development
- Parent agency: Department of Commerce
- Website: www.eda.gov

The U.S. Economic Development Administration (EDA) is an agency in the United States Department of Commerce that provides grants and technical assistance to economically distressed communities in order to generate new employment, help retain existing jobs and stimulate industrial and commercial growth through a variety of investment programs. EDA works with boards and communities across the country on economic development strategies.

== History ==
In 1965, Congress passed the Public Works and Economic Development Act of 1965 (PWEDA) (42 U.S.C. ch. 38), which authorized the creation of the Economic Development Administration (EDA) to generate jobs, help retain existing jobs, and stimulate industrial and commercial growth in economically troubled areas of the United States. EDA assistance is available to rural and urban areas of the United States experiencing high unemployment, low income, or other severe economic distress.

== Mission and investment priorities ==
The EDA's stated mission is to "lead the federal economic development agenda by promoting innovation and competitiveness, preparing American regions for growth and success in the worldwide economy."

The EDA's investment policy is designed to establish a foundation for sustainable job growth and the building of durable regional economies throughout the United States. This foundation builds upon two key economic drivers - innovation and regional collaboration. Innovation is the key to global competitiveness, new and better jobs, a resilient economy, and the attainment of national economic goals. Regional collaboration is essential for economic recovery because regions are the centers of competition in the new global economy and those that work together to leverage resources and use strengths to overcome weaknesses will fare better than those that do not. EDA encourages its partners around the country to develop initiatives that advance new ideas and creative approaches to address rapidly evolving economic conditions.

EDA's investment priorities are:

1. Equity: Economic development planning or implementation projects that advance equity across America through investments that directly benefit 1) one or more traditionally underserved populations (PDF), including but not limited to women, Black, Latino, and Indigenous and Native American persons, Asian Americans, and Pacific Islanders or 2) underserved communities within geographies that have been systemically and/or systematically denied a full opportunity to participate in aspects of economic prosperity such as Tribal Lands, Persistent Poverty Counties, and rural areas with demonstrated, historical under-service.
2. Recovery & Resilience: Economic development planning or implementation projects that build economic resilience to and long-term recovery from economic shocks, like those experienced by coal and power plant communities, or other communities impacted by the decline of an important industry or a natural disaster, that may benefit from economic diversification-focused resilience.
3. Workforce Development: Economic development planning or implementation projects that support workforce education and skills training activities directly connected to the hiring and skills needs of the business community and that result in well-paying, quality jobs
4. Manufacturing: Economic development planning or implementation projects that encourage job creation, business expansion, technology and capital upgrades, and productivity growth in manufacturing, including efforts that contribute to the competitiveness and growth of domestic suppliers or to the domestic production of innovative, high-value products and production technologies.
5. Technology-Based Economic Development: Economic development planning or implementation projects that foster regional knowledge ecosystems that support entrepreneurs and startups, including the commercialization of new technologies, that are creating technology-driven businesses and high-skilled, well-paying jobs of the future.
6. Environmentally-Sustainable Development: Economic development planning or implementation projects that help address the climate crisis including through the development and implementation of green products, green processes, including green infrastructure, green buildings, and green places including an emphasis on density in the vicinity of the development.
7. .Exports & FDI: Economic development planning or implementation projects that enhance or build community assets to support growth in US exports or increased foreign direct investment.

== Role ==
The EDA is the only federal government agency solely focused on economic development. EDA works with communities and boards across the country on regional economic development strategies to attract private investment and create jobs in economically distressed areas of the United States.

EDA's economic footprint is wide and its tool box is extensive—including technical assistance, post-disaster recovery assistance, trade adjustment support, strategic planning and research and evaluation capacity, thereby allowing the agency to offer the most effective investment to help communities succeed in the global economy.

EDA's primary programs and national initiatives are:

- American Rescue Plan (ARPA) Implementation
  - Six programs, collectively called Investing in America’s Communities, will equitably invest the $3 billion EDA received from President Biden’s American Rescue Plan. The programs aim to assist communities in their efforts to build back better by accelerating the economic recovery from the coronavirus pandemic and building local economies that will be resilient to future economic shocks. EDA is making a Coal Communities Commitment, allocating $300 million of this funding to ensure support for coal communities.
- Assistance to Coal Communities (ACC)
  - Through ACC 2018, EDA designates a portion of its EAA funding to support communities and regions that have been negatively impacted by changes in the coal economy.
- Build to Scale (B2S)
  - The Build to Scale (B2S) Program builds regional economies through scalable startups and includes three competitions supporting entrepreneurship, acceleration of company growth and increased access to risk capital across regional economies
- Economic Adjustment Assistance
  - Assists state and local interests in designing and implementing strategies to adjust or bring about change to an economy. The program focuses on areas that have experienced or are under threat of serious structural damage to the underlying economic base. Under Economic Adjustment, EDA administers its Revolving Loan Fund (RLF) Program, which supplies small businesses and entrepreneurs with the gap financing needed to start or expand their business.
- Economic Recovery Corps
  - This program is a network of Economic Recovery Corps fellows to add human capital to local organizations focused on improving economic resilience and competitiveness in distressed regions across the country.
- Equity Impact Investments
  - Equity Impact Investments provides technical assistance to enable organizations serving underserved populations and communities to participate in economic development planning and projects.
- Local Technical Assistance
  - Helps fill the knowledge and information gaps that may prevent leaders in the public and nonprofit sectors in distressed areas from making optimal decisions on local economic development issues.
- Planning
  - Supports local organizations (Economic Development Districts, Indian Tribes, and other eligible areas) with short and long-term planning efforts. The Comprehensive Economic Development Strategy (CEDS) Content Guidelines, provides suggestions, tools, and resources for developing comprehensive economic development strategies
- Public Works
  - Empowers distressed communities to revitalize, expand, and upgrade their physical infrastructure to attract new industry, encourage business expansion, diversify local economies, and generate or retain long-term, private sector jobs and investment
- Recompete Pilot Program
  - This program was recently authorized by the CHIPS and Science Act of 2022, and funds were first appropriated via the Consolidated Appropriations Act, 2023. EDA is underway with design and implementation of this program, and encourages interested stakeholders to learn more by reading the programs’ authorization at 15 U.S.C. § 3722b for Recompete and EDA’s Statement On Fiscal Year 2023 Appropriation.
- Regional Technology and Innovation Hubs (Tech Hubs)
  - This program was recently authorized by the CHIPS and Science Act of 2022, and funds were first appropriated via the Consolidated Appropriations Act, 2023. EDA is underway with design and implementation of this program, and encourages interested stakeholders to learn more by reading the programs’ authorization at 15 U.S.C. § 3722a for Regional Technology and Innovation Hubs and EDA’s Statement On Fiscal Year 2023 Appropriation.
- Research and National Technical Assistance (RNTA)
  - The RNTA program funds research, evaluation, and national technical assistance projects that promote competitiveness and innovation in distressed rural and urban regions throughout the United States and its territories.
- Revolving Loan Fund (RLF)
  - EDA provides Economic Adjustment Assistance (PDF) grants to eligible recipients to capitalize or recapitalize lending programs that service businesses that cannot otherwise obtain traditional bank financing (and in limited situations to governmental entities for public infrastructure). These loans provide access to capital as gap financing to enable small businesses to grow and generate new employment opportunities with competitive wages and benefits. Financing also helps retain jobs that might otherwise be lost, create wealth, and support minority and women-owned businesses.
- STEM Talent Challenge
  - The U.S Economic Development Administration’s STEM Talent Challenge aims to build STEM talent training systems to strengthen regional innovation economies. The FY21 STEM Talent Challenge will award a total of $2 million in grants to organizations that are creating and implementing STEM talent development strategies that complement their region’s innovation economy.
- Trade Adjustment Assistance for Firms
  - A national network of 11 Trade Adjustment Assistance Centers to help strengthen the competitiveness of American companies that have lost domestic sales and employment because of increased imports of similar goods and services
- University Centers
  - A partnership of the federal government and academia that makes the varied and vast resources of universities available to the economic development community.

== Multi-agency initiatives ==
EDA leads a host of multi-agency initiatives to advance intergovernmental and public-private partnerships across the nation. These initiatives include:

- Assistance to Coal Communities
- EDA Vista Corps
- Americas Competitiveness Exchange

== Senior leadership ==
- (VACANT), Assistant Secretary of Commerce for Economic Development
- Ben Page, Deputy Assistant Secretary of Commerce for Economic Development and COO
- Craig Buerstatte, Deputy Assistant Secretary for Regional Affairs
- Cristina Killingsworth, Deputy Assistant Secretary for Policy & External Affairs
- Christopher "CJ" Epps, Director of the Office of External Affairs
- (VACANT), Director of the Office of Public Affairs
- Jeff Roberson, Chief Counsel
- Angela Ewell-Madison, Director of the Office of Legislative and Intergovernmental Affairs
- Doug Lynott, Director of Economic Development Integration and Disaster Recovery
- (VACANT), Director of Performance and National Programs, Trade Adjustment Assistance

== See also ==
- Title 13 of the Code of Federal Regulations
- Federal Trade Commission
- United States Commercial Service
- United States Chamber of Commerce
- Small Business Administration
