= David Staveley =

American fraudster

David Adler Staveley (born 1967) is an American fraudster who was the first person to be charged with fraud in relation to the Paycheck Protection Program. Staveley, along with David A. Butziger, attempted to steal over $543,000 from the Paycheck Protection Program in forgivable loans for four businesses he either did not own or were no longer in business. After he was caught in May 2020, he attempted to fake his own suicide by drowning on June 3.

== Early life ==
David Adler Staveley was born in Lowell, Massachusetts with the name Kurt David Sanborn, a name he continued to use up until 2016. His mother is Judith Sanborn. In his early career, he worked in AM radio, public relations, and was a spokesman for the Lowell Police Department.

== Fraud ==
In 2003, Staveley met Drew Weber whom he began to work for at the Lowell Spinners, a minor league baseball team which Weber owned. Weber also gave Staveley the power to issue business checks. That year, a major development project began to both update an existing stadium and build a new one. Staveley left the business in November 2003, after purchasing a large house that cost over $500,000. It was later revealed by a law firm hired by Weber that Staveley had been creating false invoices that totaled over $200,000 and pocketing money from them. When asked for evidence of the payment for these invoices, Staveley provided documents that had been altered. After Weber discovered this, he considered taking Staveley to civil court. Staveley attempted to dissuade him from this, but Weber sued for fraud in 2006. Though he filed for bankruptcy and avoided appearing in court, he was sentenced to 30 months in prison.

After getting out of prison in 2012, it was found that he was not paying his restitution payments to Weber. He claimed to have paid, but later admitted to lying. He also lied about receiving a pay raise at his job. All of these violations led to both electronic monitoring and home detention. Later in 2013, Staveley was sentenced to 27 months for mortgage fraud which he pled guilty to and accepted a plea deal in May 2014.

Following his second release from prison in 2016, he changed his name from Kurt Sanborn to David Staveley citing religious reasons. He would also later receive 6 months of probation in relation to an incident in which he entered the house of one of his ex–girlfriends without her knowledge.

In 2020, roughly a week after the launch of the CARES Act intended to provide financial support to people impacted by COVID-19, Staveley began working on fraudulent documents with David Butziger which claimed that they had dozens of employees at four different businesses. The applications were for $144,050, $185,750, $105,381, and $108,777. The pair claimed to employ over 60 people. The authorities were first tipped off when it was realized that one of the businesses, a restaurant called On The Trax, was no longer in business as its liquor license was revoked. The local Berlin Police Department reached out to the FBI. To make sure that the two were behind the fraud, federal agents called Staveley and asked him to confirm the information they had found. He was arrested on May 5, 2020, following an arrest warrant the day prior and ordered to stay at home in Massachusetts, only being allowed to go to Rhode Island for court-related business. After an incident involving him travelling to Connecticut, a judge ordered him to wear an electronic monitoring bracelet.

Three weeks after his arrest, Staveley cut off his electronic monitoring bracelet and left a suicide note in his car along with his wallet, shoes, and key in the ignition. The car was found by the Massachusetts State Police on June 3, 2020. Search and rescue boats looked for his body, but did not find anything. After this, he obtained a minivan and used several stolen license plates. Eventually, authorities realized Staveley was on the run. He was seen in Franklin, Tennessee looking for work at several horse farms, and later in July 2020 in Alpharetta, Georgia, before eventually beginning work as a bartender. On July 23, 2020, Staveley drove to the parking lot of the skating rink to work, but was approached by local law enforcement and US marshals. When confronted, he reportedly raised his hands and said, "You got me."

=== Legal action ===
On October 7, 2021, Staveley was sentenced to 44 months in prison for conspiring to commit bank fraud and 12 months for failing to appear in court. This was after pleading guilty and accepting a plea deal earlier that year in May. He will also be supervised for 3 years following his release.
