= Cabinet Council on Commerce and Trade =

The Cabinet Council on Commerce and Trade was one of multiple Cabinet Councils established in the United States on or about February 26, 1981 by the Reagan Administration.

== History ==
Gerald J. Mossinghoff served as an Assistant Secretary of Commerce, Commissioner of Patents and Trademarks. He stated, “President Reagan supported a strong patent system...Secretary of Commerce, Malcolm Baldrige, was the head of the Cabinet Council on Commerce and Trade, and he gave him complete discretion in formulation of patent policy for the Department of Commerce. He recalled, "When I saw that Mac Baldrige was the head of the [Administration's Special Committee on] Commerce and Trade, I told him that there really ought to be . . . a senior-level committee on intellectual property, and I should chair it. Secretary Baldrige agreed and set up the Working Group on Intellectual Property of the Cabinet Council on Commerce and Trade . . ."

== Working Group on Intellectual Property ==
The working group advised President Reagan concerning many matters, most notably, the establishment of a Court of Appeals for the Federal Circuit, which strengthened and brought certainty to patent law in the United States. The group initiated a far-reaching automation program at the USPTO to computerize the office's database.

The WGIP took public comment and studied matters such as:

- Trademark counterfeiting
- Increasing the competitiveness of United States industries
- Imports of articles bearing genuine trademarks without the consent of the trademark owner (so-called “parallel imports”)

== Consolidation ==
The Cabinet Council on Commerce and Trade's Working Group on Intellectual Property (WGIP), folded in the mid-1990s into the President's Economic Policy Council.

The location of the records of the Cabinet Council on Commerce and Trade is unknown. Some records are located in the Ronald Reagan Presidential Library.
