= Title 13 of the Code of Federal Regulations =

U.S. federal rules and regulations on business credit and assistance

CFR Title 13 – Business Credit and Assistance is one of 50 titles composing the United States Code of Federal Regulations (CFR) and contains the principal set of rules and regulations issued by federal agencies regarding business credit and assistance. It is available in digital and printed form and can be referenced online using the Electronic Code of Federal Regulations (e-CFR).

== Structure ==
The table of contents, as reflected in the e-CFR updated March 4, 2014, is as follows:

Volume	Chapter	Parts	Regulatory Entity
1	I	1-199	Small Business Administration
	III	300-399	Economic Development Administration, Department of Commerce
	IV	400-499	Emergency Steel Guarantee Loan Board
	V	500-599	Emergency Oil And Gas Guaranteed Loan Board
