= Small Business Administration =

United States government agency

- Seal of the SBA

- Logo of the SBA

Agency overview
- Formed: July 30, 1953; 73 years ago
- Preceding agency: Small Defense Plants Administration, Reconstruction Finance Corporation
- Jurisdiction: Federal government of the United States
- Headquarters: 409 Third St SW Washington, D.C., U.S.
- Employees: 3,293 (2015)
- Annual budget: US$710 million (2015)
- Agency executives: Kelly Loeffler, Administrator; Bill Briggs, Deputy Administrator
- Website: sba.gov

Small Business Act of 1953
- Long title: An Act to create the Small Business Administration and to preserve small business institutions and free, competitive enterprise.
- Enacted by: the 83rd United States Congress

Citations
- Public law: Pub. L. 83-163
- Statutes at Large: 67 Stat. 232

Legislative history
- Introduced in the House as H.R. 5141 by William S. Hill (R–CO) on May 12, 1953; Signed into law by President Dwight D. Eisenhower on July 30, 1953

The United States Small Business Administration (SBA) is an independent agency of the United States government that provides support to entrepreneurs and small businesses. The mission of the Small Business Administration is "to maintain and strengthen the nation's economy by enabling the establishment and viability of small businesses and by assisting in the economic recovery of communities after disasters". The agency's activities have been summarized as the "3 Cs" of capital, contracts, and counseling.

SBA loans are made through banks, credit unions, and other lenders who partner with the SBA. The SBA provides a government-backed guarantee on part of the loan. Under the Recovery Act and the Small Business Jobs Act, SBA loans were enhanced to provide up to a 90 percent guarantee in order to strengthen access to capital for small businesses after credit froze in 2008. The agency had record lending volumes in late 2010.

The SBA helps lead the federal government's efforts to deliver 23 percent of prime federal contracts to small businesses. Small business contracting programs include efforts to ensure that certain federal contracts reach woman-owned and service-disabled veteran-owned small businesses as well as businesses participating in programs such as the 8(a) Business Development Program and HUBZone. In March 2018 the SBA launched the SBA Franchise Directory, aiming to connect entrepreneurs to lines of credit and capital in order to grow their businesses.

The SBA has at least one office in each U.S. state. In addition, the agency provides grants to support counseling partners, including approximately 900 Small Business Development Centers (often located at colleges and universities), 110 Women's Business Centers, and SCORE, a volunteer mentor corps of retired and experienced business leaders with approximately 350 chapters. These counseling services provide services to over 1 million entrepreneurs and small business owners annually. President Obama announced in January 2012 that he would elevate the SBA into the Cabinet, a position it last held during the Clinton administration, thus making the administrator of the Small Business Administration a cabinet-level position.

== History ==
The SBA was created on July 30, 1953, by Republican President Eisenhower with the signing of the Small Business Act, currently codified at 15 U.S.C. ch. 14A. The Small Business Act was originally enacted as the "Small Business Act of 1953" in Title II (67 Stat. 232) of Pub. L. 83–163 (ch. 282, 67 Stat. 230, July 30, 1953); The "Reconstruction Finance Corporation Liquidation Act" was Title I, which abolished the Reconstruction Finance Corporation (RFC). The Small Business Act Amendments of 1958 (Pub. L. 85–536, 72 Stat. 384, enacted July 18, 1958) withdrew Title II as part of that act and made it a separate act to be known as the "Small Business Act". Its function was and is to "aid, counsel, assist and protect, insofar as is possible, the interests of small business concerns".

The SBA has survived a number of threats to its existence. In 1996, the Republican-controlled House of Representatives planned to eliminate the agency. It survived and went on to receive a record high budget in 2000. Renewed efforts by the Bush Administration to end the SBA loan program met congressional resistance, although the SBA's budget was repeatedly cut, and in 2004 certain expenditures were frozen. The Obama administration supported SBA budgets and strengthened it through The American Recovery and Reinvestment Act of 2009. SBA budgets were further strengthened by the Small Business Jobs Act of 2010, and in 2011, President Obama announced that the SBA would double its support of rural small businesses to $350 million in the next 5 years.

== Organizational structure ==
The SBA has an administrator and a deputy administrator. It has an associate administrator or director for the following offices:

- Business Development
- Capital Access
- Center for Faith
- Communications and Public Liaison
- Congressional and Legislative Affairs
- Credit Risk Management
- Disaster Assistance
- Entrepreneurial Development
- Entrepreneurship Education
- Equal Employment Opportunity and Civil Rights Compliance
- Field Operations
- Government Contracting and Business Development
- Hearings and Appeals
- HUBZone Program
- International Trade
- Investment and Innovation
- Management and Administration
- Native American Affairs
- Performance Management
- Small Business Development Centers
- Veterans Business Development
- Women's Business Ownership

Senate-confirmed appointees include: Administrator, Deputy Administrator, Chief Counsel for Advocacy, and Inspector General.

== Lending programs ==
=== Loan Guarantee Program ===
The 7(a) Loan Guarantee Program is the most common loan program offered by the SBA. The program makes capital available to small businesses through bank and non-bank lending institutions. The Small Business Jobs Act of 2010 increased the maximum size of these loans from $2 million to $5 million. Effective July 4, 2026, eligible borrowers who obtain 7(a) financing first may combine up to $5 million through the 7(a) program with up to $5 million through the 504 program, for as much as $10 million in combined SBA-backed financing. According to the SBA website, it can be used for working capital (both short and long term), refinancing debt, and purchasing furniture, fixtures, and supplies. There are some businesses that are ineligible for this program, such as real estate investment firms (where property is held for investment purposes), dealers of rare coins and stamps, and lending institutions like banks.

=== Disaster Loan Program ===
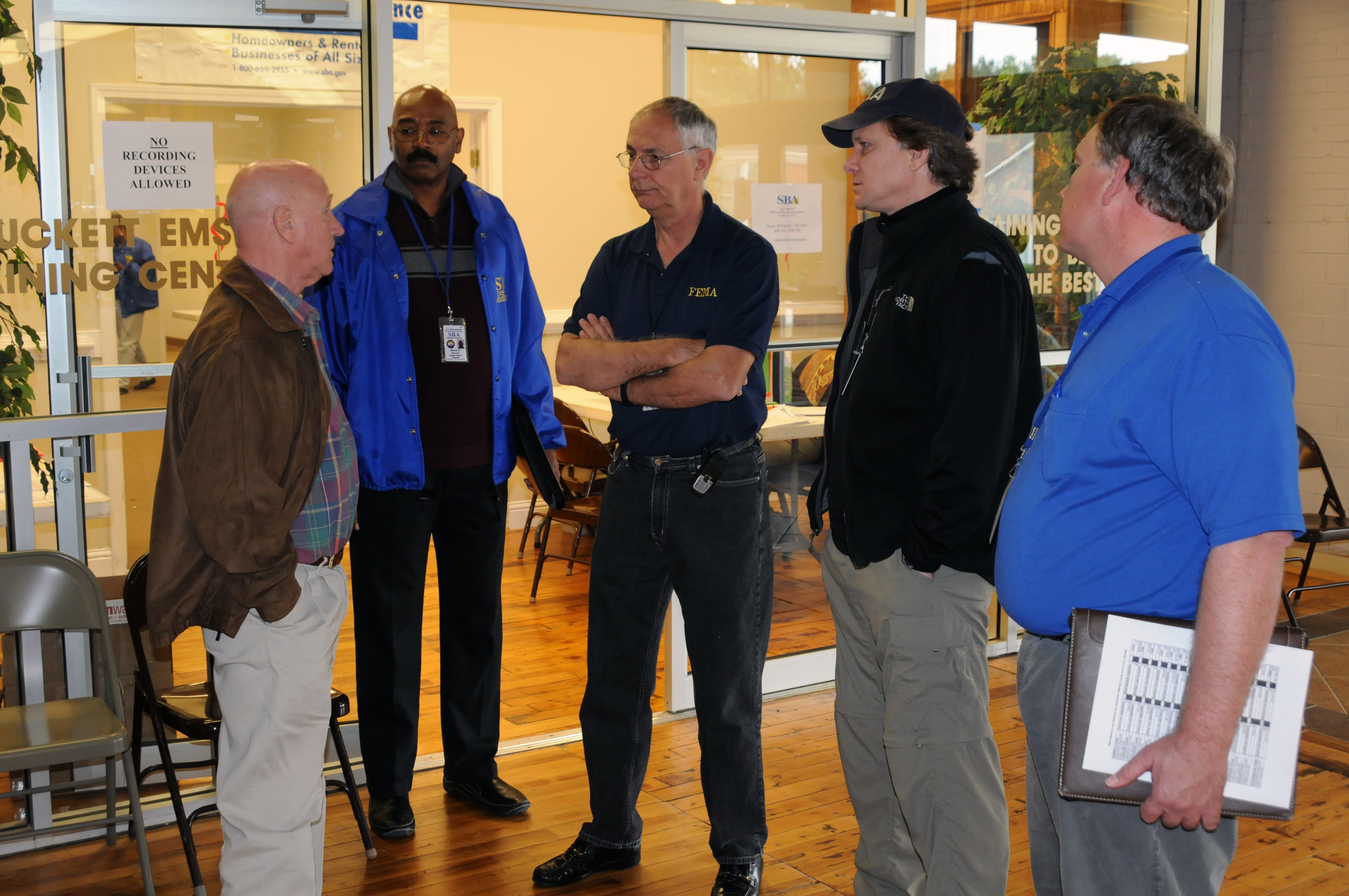
The SBA opens Disaster Loan Center in Austell, Georgia, October 26, 2009.

Homeowners and renters are eligible for loans to rebuild or repair a damaged property to pre-disaster condition. Businesses are also eligible for loans to recover from declared disasters. The stated goal for application approval of Disaster Relief Loans is 21 days, a goal established following Hurricane Katrina, when the SBA took an average of 74 days to process applications.

If a business with a Disaster Relief Loan defaults on the loan and the business is then closed, the SBA will pursue the business owner to liquidate assets if used for collateral. The IRS will withhold any tax refund expected by the former business owner and apply the amount toward the loan balance.

=== Microloan Program ===
The Microloan program provides direct loans to qualified nonprofit intermediary lenders who, in turn, provide "microloans" of up to $50,000 to small businesses and nonprofit child-care centers. It also provides marketing, management, and technical assistance to microloan borrowers and potential borrowers.

== Entrepreneurial development programs ==
=== Small Business Development Centers ===
Approximately 900 Small Business Development Center sites are funded through a combination of state and SBA support in the form of matching grants. Typically, SBDCs are co-located at community colleges, state universities, and/or other entrepreneurial hubs.

=== The Office of Women's Business Ownership ===
The Office of Women-Owned Businesses (OWBO) was established in 1979 by Executive Order 12138. The mission of the program is "to enable and empower women entrepreneurs through advocacy, outreach, education and support."

Programs managed by the OWBO provide services to disadvantaged woman entrepreneurs to assist in increasing their competitiveness in the modern business world. These programs assist women through training and counseling, providing opportunities to obtain credit, capital and marketing assistance, and establishing a Federal set-aside for women-owned businesses.

The Women's Business Center Program was established under Title II of the Women's Business Ownership Act of 1988. It was first named the Demonstration Training Program when it was created by Congress to provide a long-term solution for training and counseling potential and current women business owners, including those who are Socially and Economically Disadvantaged as defined in 13 CFR 124.103. The intent of the program was, and still is, to stimulate the economy through assisting and encouraging growth of women-owned businesses.

The current rule on the Women's Business Center Program is outlined under Title 15 of the US Code, 2019 Edition, Chapter 14A. New rules were applied to the code by the US Small Business Administration, effective January 1, 2020, as outlined in the Federal Register document, Volume 84, No. 227, Monday, November 25, 2019, Rules and Regulations. This rule document was put in place in order to make the Women's Business Center Program more transparent in reporting on progress and financial allotments, as well as providing improved standardization overall.

==== Women's Business Centers ====
Women's Business Centers (WBCs) represent a national network of over 100 non-profit educational centers throughout the United States and its territories, funded in part through SBA support. The maximum SBA grant for a WBC is $150,000 per year.

WBCs are designed to assist women in starting and growing small businesses, though their services are available to all. WBCs stated purpose is to help women succeed in business by providing training, mentoring, business development, and financing opportunities. Women's Business Centers are mandated to primarily serve socially and economically disadvantaged individuals.

Research conducted by the Association of Women's Business Centers indicates that 64% of WBC clients in 2012 were low-income, 39% were persons of color, and 70% were nascent businesses. WBC services are provided in more than 35 languages, with 64% of WBCs providing services in two or more languages. In addition to business training services, 68% of WBCs provide mentoring services, and 45% provide microloans.

=== SCORE ===
SCORE, the nation's largest network of volunteer, expert business mentors, was founded in 1964 as a resource partner of the U.S. Small Business Administration. SCORE has since educated more than 10 million current and aspiring U.S. small business owners through its free mentoring and free and low-cost workshops. In 2016, SCORE's more than 10,000 volunteer mentors helped their 125,000 clients create 54,072 small businesses, adding 78,691 non-owner jobs to the U.S. economy.

SCORE's core service offering is its mentoring program, through which volunteer mentors (all experienced in entrepreneurship and related areas of expertise) provide free counsel to small business clients. Mentors, operating out of 300 chapters nationwide, work with their clients to address issues related to starting and growing a business, including writing business plans, developing products, conceiving marketing strategies, hiring staff, and more. Clients access their mentors via free, ongoing face-to-face mentoring sessions or through email or video mentoring services.

In addition to mentoring, SCORE also offers free and low-cost educational workshops each year, both online and in-person. In 2016, clients attended 119,957 online workshop sessions, while 237,712 local workshop attendees benefited from SCORE's in-person educational programming.

=== Veteran Business Outreach Centers (VBOC) ===
The SBA's Office of Veteran Business Development operates twenty-two Veteran Business Outreach Centers through grants and cooperative agreements with organizations which provide technical assistance to businesses owned by veterans and family members. VBOCs also provide instructors for the SBA's program Boots to Business.

=== Innovation and Strategic Initiatives ===
The SBA also supports regional innovation clusters across the country.

== Federal contracting and business development programs ==
=== 8(a) Business Development Program ===
The 8(a) Business Development Program assists in the development of small businesses owned and operated by individuals who are socially and economically disadvantaged, such as women and minorities. Applicants must provide evidence of economic disadvantage (net worth under $250,000K), and must write a statement of personal experiences in combination with evidence to sufficiently demonstrate social disadvantage. The following groups are presumed socially disadvantaged through SBA policy and do not have to submit a social disadvantage narrative when applying for the program: Black Americans; Hispanic Americans; Native Americans (American Indians, Eskimos, Aleuts, or Native Hawaiians); Asian Pacific Americans (persons with origins from Burma, Thailand, Malaysia, Indonesia, Singapore, Brunei, Japan, China (including Hong Kong), Taiwan, Laos, Cambodia (Kampuchea), Vietnam, Korea, The Philippines, U.S. Trust Territory of the Pacific Islands (Republic of Palau), Republic of the Marshall Islands, Federated States of Micronesia, the Commonwealth of the Northern Mariana Islands, Guam, Samoa, Macao, Fiji, Tonga, Kiribati, Tuvalu, or Nauru); Subcontinent Asian Americans (persons with origins from India, Pakistan, Bangladesh, Sri Lanka, Bhutan, the Maldives Islands or Nepal). However, on July 19, 2023, a US district court ruled that this presumption is unconstitutional because its use of racial discrimination doesn't pass the strict scrutiny standard.

The 8(a) Program opens the doors for disadvantaged firms to grow and develop for a period of 9-years. It has increased jobs for thousands of people across the Nation, and many of the successful firms had impacted their communities with internships, college funding, and more. Annually, of the government's $99B in small business contracts, 8(a) firms are awarded 5% of contracts.

In 2011, the SBA, along with the FBI and the IRS, uncovered a massive scheme to defraud this program. Civilian employees of the U.S. Army Corps of Engineers, working in concert with an employee of Alaska Native Corporation Eyak Technology LLC allegedly submitted fraudulent bills to the program, totaling over 20 million dollars, and kept the money for their own use.

== Office of Hearings and Appeals ==
The Office of Hearings and Appeals (OHA) is an independent office within the SBA established in 1983 to provide an independent, quasi-judicial appeal against certain SBA program decisions.

OHA is able to hear appeals regarding:

- Size determinations,
- Contracting officer designations of North American Industry Classification System (NAICS) codes on federal contracts,
- Eligibility determinations for Service-Disabled Veteran-Owned Small Business Concerns (SDVO SBC),
- Eligibility of Women-Owned Small Businesses (WOSB),
- Eligibility of Economically Disadvantaged WOSB (EDWOSB), and
- 8(a)BD eligibility determinations, suspensions and terminations.

The OHA publishes unredacted final decisions within a few days of each decision being issued.

== Criticism ==
The Cato Institute has challenged the justification of the federal government in intervening in credit markets. Among other criticisms, Cato argues that "the SBA benefits a relatively tiny number of small businesses at the expense of the vast majority of small business that do not receive government assistance. SBA subsidies also represent a form of corporate welfare for the banking industry." Cato notes that the failure rate of all SBA loans from 2001 to 2010 is 19.4%, contributing to a cost to taxpayers of $6.2 billion in 2011.

In 2005, SBA Inspector General Report 5-15 stated, "One of the most important challenges facing the Small Business Administration and the entire Federal government today is that large businesses are receiving small business procurement awards and agencies are receiving credit for these awards."

In October 2009, the Government Accountability Office released Report 10-108 which stated, "By failing to hold firms accountable, SBA and contracting agencies have sent a message to the contracting community that there is no punishment or consequences for committing fraud."

Between 2009 and 2011, 7a Program guaranteed loans to Black-owned businesses declined by 47%. Black loans are 3% of 7a loans for fiscal years 2014-2019. The SBA report to Congress has minority loans at 23%.

On April 17, 2020, the SBA approved $20 million in forgivable loans to Ruth's Hospitality Group, a publicly traded company, as part of the Paycheck Protection Program. While accommodation and franchise businesses were allowed by legislation to participate in the Paycheck Protection Program per its qualification requirements, the loan made to Ruth's Hospitality Group represents a departure from the SBA's mission to serve small businesses.

On May 21, 2020, it was reported that Planned Parenthood improperly received Paycheck Protection Program fundings. In response, the SBA sent a demand letter to Planned Parenthood requesting that they return the improperly received funding.

In December 2020, according to data released after a federal lawsuit filed by several news organizations under the Freedom of Information Act challenging the SBA's refusal to release records on borrowers and loan amounts relating to the government's Paycheck Protection Program, it was revealed that more than half of the money from the Treasury Department's coronavirus emergency fund for small businesses actually went to bigger small businesses representing just 5 percent of the recipients. The CARES Act of 2020 generally classified a small business as a business with 500 employees or fewer.

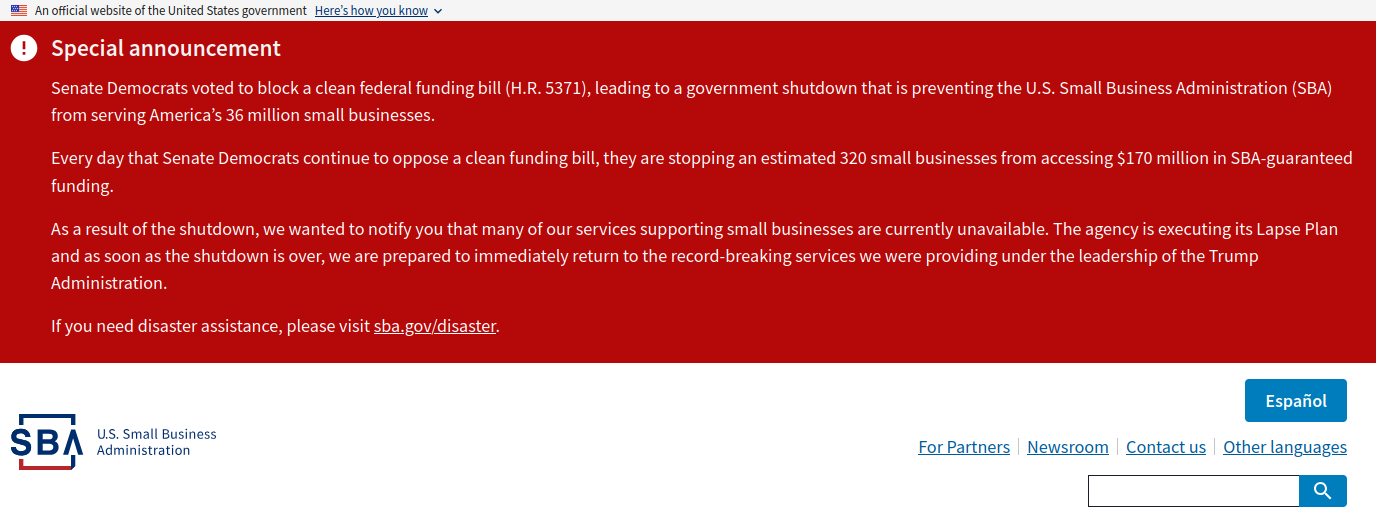
The SBA shutdown notice causing the Hatch Act complaint over administrator Loeffler

In October 2025 the watchdog group Public Citizen filed a Hatch Act complaint against Kelly Loeffler as SBA administrator alleging that the SBA's shutdown notice about the 2025 United States federal government shutdown was "electioneering" while on duty.

== See also ==
- Administrator of the Small Business Administration
- Title 13 of the Code of Federal Regulations
- Business Development Bank of Canada
