= Employee Retention Credit =

United States federal tax credit

The Employee Retention Credit (ERC), sometimes called the Employee Retention Tax Credit (ERTC), is a U.S. federal tax credit that was available to certain employers, most recently during the COVID-19 pandemic. It was originally designed to help employers who were not eligible for a Paycheck Protection Program loan, but it was later amended so employers who received Paycheck Protection Program loan forgiveness were often still eligible for the Employee Retention Credit. Due to a substantial number of improper claims, processing of amended forms claiming the Employee Retention Credit was temporarily suspended as of September 14, 2023. The claim period ended on April 15, 2025.

== Employee Retention Credit during the COVID-19 Pandemic ==
=== Overview ===
The Employee Retention Credit is a refundable tax credit against an employer's payroll taxes. It was established as part of the Coronavirus Aid, Relief, and Economic Security Act (CARES Act), signed into law by President Donald Trump, in order to help employers during the pandemic. The American Rescue Plan Act of 2021, signed into law by President Joseph Biden, expanded the tax credit to additional employers.

=== Eligibility ===
There are two ways for an employer to be eligible for the Employee Retention Credit for a particular calendar quarter.

- The employer experienced a significant decline in gross receipts, (Note: Gross receipts are defined as all of the employer's revenue except Paycheck Protection Program (PPP) loan forgiveness, Shuttered Venue Operators grant income, and Restaurant Revitalization grant income. (Note: 26 U.S.C. § 6033 for tax-exempt entities. 26 U.S.C. § 448(c) for other entities.) The employer should use the same accounting method (cash method or accrual method) as it uses for tax purposes.)

or

- The employer either fully or partially suspended its operations because of governmental orders related to COVID-19 that limited commerce, travel, or group meetings.

An eligible employer must be a for-profit entity, an organizations that is tax-exempt under section 501(c) of the Internal Revenue Code, (Note: Organizations that are tax-exempt under sections other than 501(c) are not eligible for the Employee Retention Credit.) public colleges and hospitals, (Note: Any governmental entity is eligible for the Employee Retention Credit if it is a college or university or if its principal purpose or function is to provide medical or hospital care.) or a tribal government or entity. A household employer is not eligible. Self-employed individuals may take the Employee Retention Credit for the wages paid to their employees but not for their own compensation.

==== Significant Decline in Gross Receipts ====
For 2020, a significant decline in gross receipts begins during a calendar quarter in which gross receipts decreased by at least 50 percent compared to the corresponding quarter in 2019. Gross receipts include all income for the employer, including donations and grants. When an employer meets this test for a calendar quarter, the effective date is the first day of that particular calendar quarter. When an employer's gross receipts for a calendar quarter decreased no more than 20 percent compared to its gross receipts for the same corresponding quarter in 2019, the employer's eligibility ends on the day following that calendar quarter.

For 2021, a significant decline in gross receipts begins during a calendar quarter in which gross receipts decreased by at least 20 percent compared to its gross receipts for the same corresponding quarter in 2019. Alternatively, an employer can compare its gross receipts to the previous calendar quarter, such as if the employer was not in business during 2019.

Certain businesses that are related to each other may be considered one business when determining whether there was a significant decline in gross receipts.

The reason for the significant decline in gross receipts is not relevant, and it does need to be directly related to the COVID-19 pandemic.

==== Fully or Partially Suspended Operations ====
The employer is eligible if there was an order from the government to limit commerce, travel, or group meetings (Note: For churches and other religious organizations, group meetings include religious meetings and group worship services.) that resulted in the employer's partial or full suspension of operations.

An order from the government includes an official rule (Note: A government official's comments made during a press conference or an interview are not considered an order from the government.) from any federal, state, or local government that has jurisdiction over the employer. The governmental order must have caused the employer to either fully or partially suspend its operations. (Note: An official rule that only requires the employer to operate differently is not considered an order from the government.)

Only governmental orders and mandatory requirements qualify. Recommendations, suggestions, and best practices issued by governmental entities do not qualify.

In order to qualify, the order from the government must have affected an activity of the employer that constituted at least 10 percent of the employer's total gross receipts in 2019. Alternatively, the limitation must affect a portion of the employer's operations that constituted at least 10% of the working hours performed by its employees in 2019.

A governmental order that reduced the maximum occupancy of the employer's place of business would likely qualify, for example, while a governmental order requiring all employees and clients to wear facemasks probably would not qualify. If a governmental order that requires the business's employees to work at home and the employer is able to conduct its business this way, then that order would be unlikely to qualify.

=== Amount of the Employee Retention Credit ===
==== For 2020 ====
The Employee Retention Credit is equal to 50 percent of qualified wages paid to eligible employees between March 13, 2020, and December 31, 2020.

Eligible employee is defined differently depending on the size of the employer. If the employer averaged 100 or fewer full-time employees (Note: For the purpose of determining the size of the employer only, the employer should consider an employee a full-time employee for a particular month if the employee was paid at least 30 hours per week or at least 130 paid hours during the month. Other employees are not counted at all for this test.) during 2019, then all of its employees are eligible employees. For larger employers, only employees who were paid for not performing work are considered eligible employees.

Qualified wages are defined as wages that are subject to social security tax (Note: Wages paid to employees not subject to social security tax, such as ordained clergy and certain non-resident aliens, are not qualified wages. Wages not subject to social security tax, such as those deferred as part of a Section 125 cafeteria plan, are also not qualified wages. Wages paid to former employees that result from the end of their employment, such as severance pay, are also not qualified wages.) and that were paid to employees. (Note: For 2020 only, qualified wages cannot exceed the amount that the employee would have been paid to the employer for an equivalent period during the previous 30 days. Wages paid in 2021 are not subject to this limitation.) Qualifying wages also include qualified health plan expenses that the employer incurred or paid for eligible employees. Qualified health plan expenses include costs for group health insurance, group dental insurance, group vision insurance, group prescription drug insurance, health flexible spending account (FSA), or a health reimbursement account (HRA). (Note: Employer-paid costs for a health savings account (HSA), an Archer MSA, or a Qualified Small Employer Health Reimbursement Arrangement (QSEHRA) are not considered qualified health plan expenses.) (Note: Qualified health plan expenses are the employer-paid and the pre-tax employee-paid portion of the cost paid by the employer with one exception. Amounts paid by employees with after-tax contributions are not qualified health plan expenses.) Qualified wages may not exceed $10,000 per eligible employee during that period.

An employer is not allowed to take the Employee Retention Credit on any wages or health plan expenses that the employer counted for its Paycheck Protection Program (PPP) loan forgiveness, Emergency Paid Sick Leave, or Emergency Paid Family Leave.

Because an employer may claim a 50-percent tax credit on up to $10,000 per eligible employee, an employer may take a maximum tax credit of $5,000 per eligible employee in 2020.

==== For 2021 ====
The Employee Retention Credit is equal to 70 percent of qualified wages paid between January 1, 2021, and September 30, 2021. If the employer is a recovery startup business, then it is based on qualified wages paid between January 1, 2021, and December 31, 2021. (Note: A recovery startup business is defined as an employer whose business began after February 15, 2020, and has average annual gross receipts of up to $1,000,000.) (Note: If the employer is eligible for the Employee Retention Credit during a particular quarter solely because it is a recovery startup business, it is limited to a credit of no more than $50,000.)

Qualified wages are wages subject to social security tax and paid to employees between January 1, 2021, and September 30, 2021, limited to up to $10,000 per quarter per employee in 2021. Just like 2020, qualified wages also include qualified health plan expenses, but exclude wages used for its Paycheck Protection Program (PPP) loan forgiveness and payments of Emergency Paid Sick Leave and Emergency Paid Family Leave. A 70-percent tax credit on up to $10,000 per employee per quarter means the maximum Employee Retention Credit is $7,000 per employee per quarter in 2021.

For 2021, if the employer had an average of 500 or fewer full-time employees in 2019, then all of the employer's employees are eligible employees. Otherwise, only employees who were paid and who did not perform work are generally eligible employees.

=== Receiving the Employee Retention Credit ===
During 2020 and 2021, an employer was able to use the Employee Retention Credit to reduce its federal tax deposits, namely its the deposits of federal withholding tax, employee social security tax, employee Medicare tax, employer social security tax, and employer Medicare tax. (Note: An employer must first reduce its federal deposits for the Section 3111(e) qualified veteran tax credit and the Section 3111(f) research tax credit, if any.)

If the employer's Employee Retention Credit exceeded its federal tax deposits, the employer was able to receive the additional tax credit refunded to it by check when it filed its Form 941. (Note: Certain employers do not use Form 941. Agricultural employers use Form 943 instead. Employers whose annual tax liability for social security, Medicare, and withheld federal income taxes is $1,000 or less use Form 944 instead. Employers who pay compensation to any employees subject to the Railroad Retirement Act use Form CT1 instead.)

Employers that wanted to receive the tax credit before its next Form 941 was filed were allowed to fax a completed Form 7200 to the Internal Revenue Service in order to request a check sooner. (Note: Employers with more than 500 full-time employees were not eligible to file a Form 7200.)

An employer that has already filed its Form 941 for each quarter may file a Form 941-X with the IRS in order to request the tax credit be refunded to it by a check by mail. An employer may file Form 941-X to receive a tax refund up to three years and four months after the end of the calendar year if the original Form 941 was filed before that date. It is common for an employer to wait eight months for the Internal Revenue Service to process its Form 941-X.

As a tax credit, there are no limitations as to how the employer uses the funds from the tax refund.

The claim period for the Employee Retention Credit ended on April 15, 2025.

=== Relation to other tax deductions ===
An employer's tax deduction for qualifying wages must be reduced by the amount of the Employee Retention Credit. Consequently, an employer that amends its tax forms to claim the Employer Retention Credit for previous quarters may also be required to amend its income tax returns in such a scenario.

The Employee Retention Credit may also affect whether a pass-through entity owner can take a 199A deduction.

=== Fraud ===
There are businesses that have offered to file amended tax forms with the Internal Revenue Service on behalf of employers in order to claim the tax credit on behalf of them.

While some of these businesses are legitimate, others claim that employers are eligible for the Employee Retention Credit when they are not. Some misstate the maximum amount of the tax credit. Others charge substantial fees for preparing the amended tax forms.

An employer is responsible for the information on its amended tax forms, even if a separate company helped file them. When an employer files a tax form claiming the Employer Tax Credit, the Internal Revenue Service is allowed to audit an amended tax form for up to five years after its filing.

In February 2023, two individuals and their accounting firm were indicted on federal charges for allegedly preparing and sending over 1,000 tax forms to the IRS that claimed millions of dollars of false and fraudulent Employee Retention Credit tax credits for their clients.

There are many tax preparation businesses that widely advertise the Employee Retention Credit to employers, implying that the employers qualify for the tax credit even if they do not or ignoring the regulations that would reduce the tax credit. These tax preparation businesses typically charge their clients a percentage of the Employee Retention Credit claimed, and illegally filing for a larger tax credit than their client is actually allowed to claim often increases the amount the business charges the client. Both the tax preparer and the client are legally responsible for the amount of the Employee Retention Credit claimed.

As of July 2023, the Internal Revenue Service's criminal investigation division had begun 252 investigations into over $2.8 billion of potentially fraudulent claims. Of these, fifteen have been charged with federal crimes so far, and six have been convicted so far. The Internal Revenue Service had received several hundred-thousand claims for the credit over the previous 90 days.

In August 2023, the Internal Revenue Service enacted a new rule stating that payments of Employee Retention Credit to ineligible employers would be considered underpaid taxes and would be assessed and collected like any other underpaid taxes.

Congress passed a law giving the Internal Revenue Service five years to audit claims for the Employee Retention Credit, which is longer than the usual three years.

As of May 2025, the Internal Revenue Service has issued approximately 84,000 letters informing businesses that their Employee Retention Credit claims have been partially or fully disallowed.

=== Suspension of processing new claims ===
On September 14, 2023, the Internal Revenue Service temporarily stopped processing forms for new claims for the Employee Retention Credit. The Internal Revenue Service said the reason was that there had been many businesses claiming the Employee Retention Credit when they were ineligible, and there were many companies promoting the Employee Retention Credit to ineligible businesses. It said it would not process new claims for the Employee Retention Credit until at least January 2, 2024. It said it would still process claims received prior September 14, 2023, although they would likely take longer to process them, particularly if the claim merited further review. On August 8, 2024, the IRS announced that it would begin processing claims submitted between September 14 2023, and January 30, 2024.

The Internal Revenue Service plans to introduce a settlement program for businesses that were victims of companies that told the businesses they were eligible for the Employee Retention Credit when they were not. It also said it would create a way for a business to voluntarily withdraw its claim if it is still in process.

The claim period for the Employee Retention Credit ended on April 15, 2025.

The One Big Beautiful Bill Act made the temporary processing suspension permanent. Entities are retroactively not allowed to file a claim after January 31, 2024, for the third and fourth quarter of 2021. Claims filed prior to that date and/or for other quarters will still be processed. The Act also extended the Internal Revenue Service's statute of limitations from five years to six years to review whether Employee Retention Credit claims for the third and fourth quarters of 2021 were validly claimed. The Internal Revenue Service's statute of limitations other quarters is unchanged at three years.

=== Denials, delays, and lawsuits ===
If the IRS sends a denial letter to a business that filed for the Employee Retention Credit, the business may file a refund lawsuit within two years from the date of the denial letter. The business is also allowed to ask the IRS to extend the two-year window for filing a refund lawsuit by using Form 907 and the IRS's Document Upload Tool, although the IRS is not required to approve the request. Alternatively, the Tucker Act might allow a business to file a refund lawsuit within six and a half years of the refund claim.

== Employee Retention Credit after Hurricanes Katrina, Rita, and Wilma ==
The Employee Retention Credit was also available to businesses affected by Hurricane Katrina, Hurricane Rita, and Hurricane Wilma in 2005.

In order to be eligible, a businesses must have conducted an active trade or business in the Gulf Opportunity Zone, (Note: The Gulf Opportunity Zone comprised Baldwin, Choctaw, Clarke, Greene, Hale, Marengo, Mobile, Pickens, Sumter, Tuscaloosa, and Washington counties in Alabama; Acadia, Ascension, Assumption, Calcasieu, Cameron, East Baton Rouge, East Feliciana, Iberia, Iberville, Jefferson, Jefferson Davis, Lafayette, Lafourche, Livingston, Orleans, Plaquemines, Pointe Coupee, St. Bernard, St. Charles, St. Helena, St. James, St. John the Baptist, St. Martin, St. Mary, St. Tammany, Tangipahoa, Terrebonne, Vermilion, Washington, West Baton Rouge, and West Feliciana parishes in Louisiana; and Adams, Amite, Attala, Choctaw, Claiborne, Clarke, Copiah, Covington, Forrest, Franklin, George, Greene, Hancock, Harrison, Hinds, Holmes, Humphreys, Jackson, Jasper, Jefferson, Jefferson Davis, Jones, Kemper, Lamar, Lauderdale, Lawrence, Leake, Lincoln, Lowndes, Madison, Marion, Neshoba, Newton, Noxubee, Oktibbeha, Pearl River, Perry, Pike, Rankin, Scott, Simpson, Smith, Stone, Walthall, Warren, Wayne, Wilkinson, Winston, and Yazoo counties in Mississippi.) the Rita Gulf Opportunity Zone, (Note: The Rita Gulf Opportunity Zone comprised Acadia, Allen, Ascension, Beauregard, Calcasieu, Cameron, Evangeline, Iberia, Jefferson, Jefferson Davis, Lafayette, Lafourche, Livingston, Plaquemines, Sabine, St. Landry, St. Martin, St. Mary, St. Tammany, Terrebonne, Vermilion, Vernon, and West Baton Rouge parishes in Louisiana; and Angelina, Brazoria, Chambers, Fort Bend, Galveston, Hardin, Harris, Jasper, Jefferson, Liberty, Montgomery, Nacogdoches, Newton, Orange, Polk, Sabine, San Augustine, San Jacinto, Shelby, Trinity, Tyler, and Walker counties in Texas.) or the Wilma Gulf Opportunity Zone. (Note: The Wilma Gulf Opportunity Zone comprised Brevard, Broward, Collier, Glades, Henry, Indian River, Lee, Martin, Miami-Dade, Monroe, Okeechobee, Palm Beach, and St. Lucie counties in Florida.)

Damage caused by the hurricane must have caused the business to be inoperable during at least one day during a specific time period (for Hurricane Katrina, August 29 – December 31, 2005; Hurricane Rita, September 24 – December 31, 2005; and Hurricane Wilma, October 24 – December 31, 2005). A qualifying business could take the tax credit for wages paid to an eligible employee only while the business was inoperable during the specified time period. The employee's principal place of employment had to be within the applicable Opportunity Zone.

The tax credit was equal to 40% of qualified wages per eligible employee, up to a maximum of $6,000 in qualified wages per employee.
