= Drugstore.com =

Former internet retailer

Drugstore.com, Inc.
- Drugsore.com corporate logo
- Company type: Subsidiary
- Website type: Retail; Online shopping
- Available in: English
- Owner: Walgreens Boots Alliance
- Editors: Dawn G. Lepore (chairman, president, and CEO, 2004 - 2011)
- Website: Archived official website at the Wayback Machine (archive index)
- Commercial: Yes
- Registration: No
- Launched: February 24, 1999 to September 30, 2016
- Current status: Defunct

drugstore.com was an American internet retailer in health and beauty care products. Its web operations were launched on February 24, 1999, and shut down on September 30, 2016 after being acquired by Walgreens in March 2011 for $409 million.

In June 1999, Rite Aid entered into a ten-year strategic relationship with Drugstore.com which allowed Drugstore.com customers to pick up prescriptions at Rite Aid stores, and enabled Drugstore.com to sell Rite Aid products, as well as vitamins from retailer General Nutrition Center (GNC). On September 3, 2008, Drugstore.com amended and restated both the main agreement and the pharmacy supply and services agreement dated June 17, 1999 between Rite Aid and Drugstore.com. Through those agreements with Rite Aid, Drugstore.com had access to Rite Aid customers through the RiteAid.com website and the Rite Aid online store, which was powered by the Drugstore.com website. Drugstore.com ended a sourcing deal with Amazon.com in 2005.

Its headquarters were at 411 108th Ave. NE, Suite 1600; Bellevue, WA 98004; (425) 372–3200, and the company had customer service centers in Bellevue, Washington and Halifax, Nova Scotia.

DS Distribution, Inc., located in the Pureland Industrial Complex in Logan Township, New Jersey, was its wholly owned subsidiary responsible for the distribution of OTC products, beauty.com products, and CNS (Custom Nutrition Services) products. Distribution of VisionDirect.com products is from a center in Logan Township, New Jersey. Prescriptions were handled by Walgreens.

It had an "FSA store" containing items that are likely to be eligible for purchase using a medical flexible spending account, and by extension a health reimbursement account or health savings account as well. This in turn led to its invention of the first inventory information approval system (IIAS) in 2005; it wasn't used in brick-and-mortar retailing until 2006 by Walgreens. Under a 2006 Internal Revenue Service ruling, IIAS must be installed by every grocery store, discount store, and Internet pharmacy that accepts FSA debit cards by the end of 2007, and by most chain pharmacies by the end of 2008.

On December 27, 2009, Drugstore.com announced plans to acquire Salu Inc., the operator of SkinStore.com, for $36 million. The transaction completed on February 19, 2010.

On March 24, 2011, Drugstore.com was acquired by Walgreens for $409 million.

On July 28, 2016, Walgreens said it would shut down Drugstore.com and Beauty.com at the end of September, 2016, to focus on its own Walgreens.com website.
