= Outreach and Assistance for Socially Disadvantaged Farmers and Ranchers =

US Department of Agriculture program

Outreach and Assistance for Socially Disadvantaged Farmers and Ranchers is a program operated by the Cooperative State Research, Education, and Extension Service (CSREES) of the United States Department of Agriculture (USDA) that provides grants to eligible organizations assist socially disadvantaged farmers and ranchers to own and operate farms and ranches and to participate in agriculture programs.

It supports a wide range of outreach and assistance activities, including farm management, marketing, application, and bidding procedures to members of a socially disadvantaged group, generally defined as persons whose race, ethnicity, or gender has subjected them to prejudice.

== See also ==
- Socially disadvantaged farmers and ranchers
