= American Rescue Plan Act of 2021 =

Act to address economic effects of COVID-19

- Long title: To provide for reconciliation pursuant to title II of S. Con. Res. 5.
- Acronyms (colloquial): ARP, ARPA
- Nicknames: COVID-19 Stimulus Package, American Rescue Plan
- Enacted by: the 117th United States Congress
- Effective: March 11, 2021

Citations
- Public law: Pub. L. 117–2 (text) (PDF)
- Statutes at Large: 135 Stat. 4

Legislative history
- Introduced in the House as H.R. 1319 by John Yarmuth (D–KY) on February 24, 2021; Committee consideration by House Budget; Passed the House on February 27, 2021 (219–212); Passed the Senate on March 6, 2021 (50–49) with amendment; House agreed to Senate amendment on March 10, 2021 (220–211); Signed into law by President Joe Biden on March 11, 2021

The American Rescue Plan Act of 2021, also called the COVID-19 Stimulus Package or American Rescue Plan, is a US$1.9 trillion economic stimulus bill passed by the 117th United States Congress and signed into law by President Joe Biden on March 11, 2021, to speed up the country's recovery from the economic and health effects of the COVID-19 pandemic and recession. First proposed on January 14, 2021, the package builds upon many of the measures in the CARES Act from March 2020 and in the Consolidated Appropriations Act, 2021, from December.

On February 8, 2021, the Financial Services and Education and Labor committees released a draft of $1.9 trillion stimulus legislation. A portion of the relief package was approved by the House Ways and Means on February 11, setting it up for a vote in the House. The legislation was also approved by the Transportation and Infrastructure, Small Business, and House Veterans Affairs committees. On February 22, the House Budget Committee voted 19–16 to advance the bill to the House for a floor vote. The bill passed the House by a vote of 219–212 on February 27. All but two Democrats voted for the bill and all Republicans voted against the bill. A modified version passed the Senate on March 6 by a vote of 50–49. The final amended bill was passed by the House on March 10 by a vote of 220–211 with one Democrat (Jared Golden) voting against it alongside all Republicans. Biden signed the bill into law on March 11, 2021.

The American Rescue Plan Act provided for direct economic stimulus payments to individual taxpayers with incomes of $75,000 or less. The act also allocated $350 billion in assistance to state and local governments, $14 billion for COVID-19 vaccine distribution, and $130 billion to schools to help them safely re-open for in-person instruction. The act included $300 billion in unemployment benefits scheduled to extend through Labor Day 2021, as well as an expanded child tax credit. In addition, the act called for the distribution of $50 billion to small businesses and another $25 billion for relief for small and mid-sized restaurants. The act expanded eligibility for Affordable Care Act (ACA) subsidies and gave states incentives to expand Medicaid. Through temporary expansions of the Earned Income Tax Credit (EITC) and Child Tax Credit (CTC), the act has been estimated to have lifted more than 2 million children above the poverty line.

State and Local Fiscal Recovery Funds (SLFRF) allocated according to a city's Tiered Classification (1-5) must be spent by December 2026.

== Background ==
=== Impact of the COVID-19 pandemic ===
By mid-2020, the United States was facing what the National Bureau of Economic Research determined was an economic recession, and by February 2021, 500,000 Americans had died of COVID-19. Over 29 million Americans had tested positive for COVID-19 by March. The United States also faced eviction, unemployment, and hunger crises since the start of the pandemic. Over 30 to 40 million Americans faced a risk of being evicted from their homes by January 2021. Then-president Donald Trump also faced criticism for not having a federal strategy to combat the pandemic, such as nationwide mask mandates on transportation, a mass testing strategy, health guidelines, providing medical-grade protective gear, and having an effective vaccine distribution strategy. On January 20, the day after Joe Biden was inaugurated, he warned that the death toll could exceed 500,000. According to Snopes, Biden inherited a vaccine distribution strategy from Trump, and disease expert Anthony Fauci said that his administration would incorporate some aspects of that Trump-era strategy in its ongoing work.

=== Previous COVID-19 pandemic legislation ===
Prior to the passing of the American Rescue Plan, the CARES Act and Consolidated Appropriations Act, 2021 were signed into law by then-president Donald Trump in March and December 2020, respectively. Trump previously expressed support for direct payments of $2,000 along with Joe Biden and many Democrats. Even though Trump called for Congress to pass a bill increasing direct payments from $600 to $2,000, then-Senate Majority Leader Mitch McConnell blocked the effort. Additionally, the House voted on the HEROES Act in May 2020, which would operate as a $3 trillion relief package. Despite approval in the lower chambers, the Republican-led Senate would not consider such a bill, citing it to be "dead on arrival". Prior to the Georgia Senate runoffs, Biden said that the direct payments of $2,000 would be passed only if Democratic candidates Jon Ossoff and Raphael Warnock won; the promise of comprehensive COVID-19 relief legislation was reported as a factor in their eventual victories. On January 14, prior to being inaugurated as president, Biden announced the $1.9 trillion stimulus package.

== Legislative history ==
=== Negotiations ===
Letter from Senate GOP to President Biden detailing concerns of the American Rescue Plan

Ten Republican senators announced plans to unveil a roughly $600 billion COVID-19 relief package as a counterproposal to President Joe Biden's $1.9 trillion plan meant to force negotiations. The senators, including Susan Collins of Maine, Lisa Murkowski of Alaska, Mitt Romney of Utah, and Rob Portman of Ohio, told Biden in a letter that they devised the plan "in the spirit of bipartisanship and unity" that the president has urged and said they planned to release a full proposal on February 1. On the same day, House speaker Nancy Pelosi and Senate majority leader Chuck Schumer introduced a budget resolution co-sponsored by Bernie Sanders as a step to pass the legislation without support from the Republican Party. The next day, Biden met with Schumer and other Democrats regarding the relief package.

On February 7, Secretary of Transportation Pete Buttigieg and Treasury Secretary Janet Yellen expressed support for the stimulus package. Yellen said that the funding would help millions of Americans and rejected concerns the colossal spending could cause inflation. Yellen also said that the stimulus package would restore full employment by 2022. On February 9, Biden met with JPMorgan Chase CEO Jamie Dimon and other CEOs to discuss the stimulus plan, with Yellen and Harris taking part in the meeting. On February 11, Pelosi said that she expects lawmakers to complete the legislation by the end of February, and for the legislation to be signed into law by March 14.

On February 16, Biden promoted his stimulus plan in a visit in Milwaukee, Wisconsin, during his first official trip as president. He promoted it via a CNN townhall meeting with voters. On February 18, Yellen called for major stimulus checks during an interview on CNBC, and said that stimulus checks would help the economy stage a full recovery.

=== Budget resolution passage ===
The United States Senate voted 50–49 to open debate on the resolution, which would allow Democrats to pass the relief package without support from Republicans through the process of reconciliation. The House voted 218–212 to approve the budget resolution. On February 4, a vote-a-rama session began, and the Senate introduced amendments to the relief package, including an amendment in a 90–10 vote that would provide direct relief to the restaurant industry. Vice President Kamala Harris cast a tie-breaking vote as President of the Senate for final Senate passage of the reconciliation bill, sending it to the House approval of the changes, and allowing drafting of the relief bill to begin in the committees. The House approved the resolution 219–209, with Jared Golden being the sole Democrat to join all Republicans in opposition to the bill due to a preference for a separate vaccine bill instead of the longer reconciliation process.

One of the many non-binding budget amendments in the vote-a-rama session was meant to prohibit people who are in the country illegally from receiving pandemic relief checks. The non-binding amendments were not likely to have any effect on the final relief bill. The Republican Party used hundreds of non-binding votes in the hours-long vote-a-rama session to send messages. Under current law, undocumented immigrants were already prohibited from receiving pandemic relief checks. The amendment passed with eight Democrats joining all Republicans. The amendment received criticism from progressive immigration activist Greisa Martínez Rosas and Senator Mazie Hirono (D-HI). The White House later stated that it would continue to support legislation that would give all otherwise eligible individuals with social security numbers stimulus checks.

=== Budget reconciliation passage ===
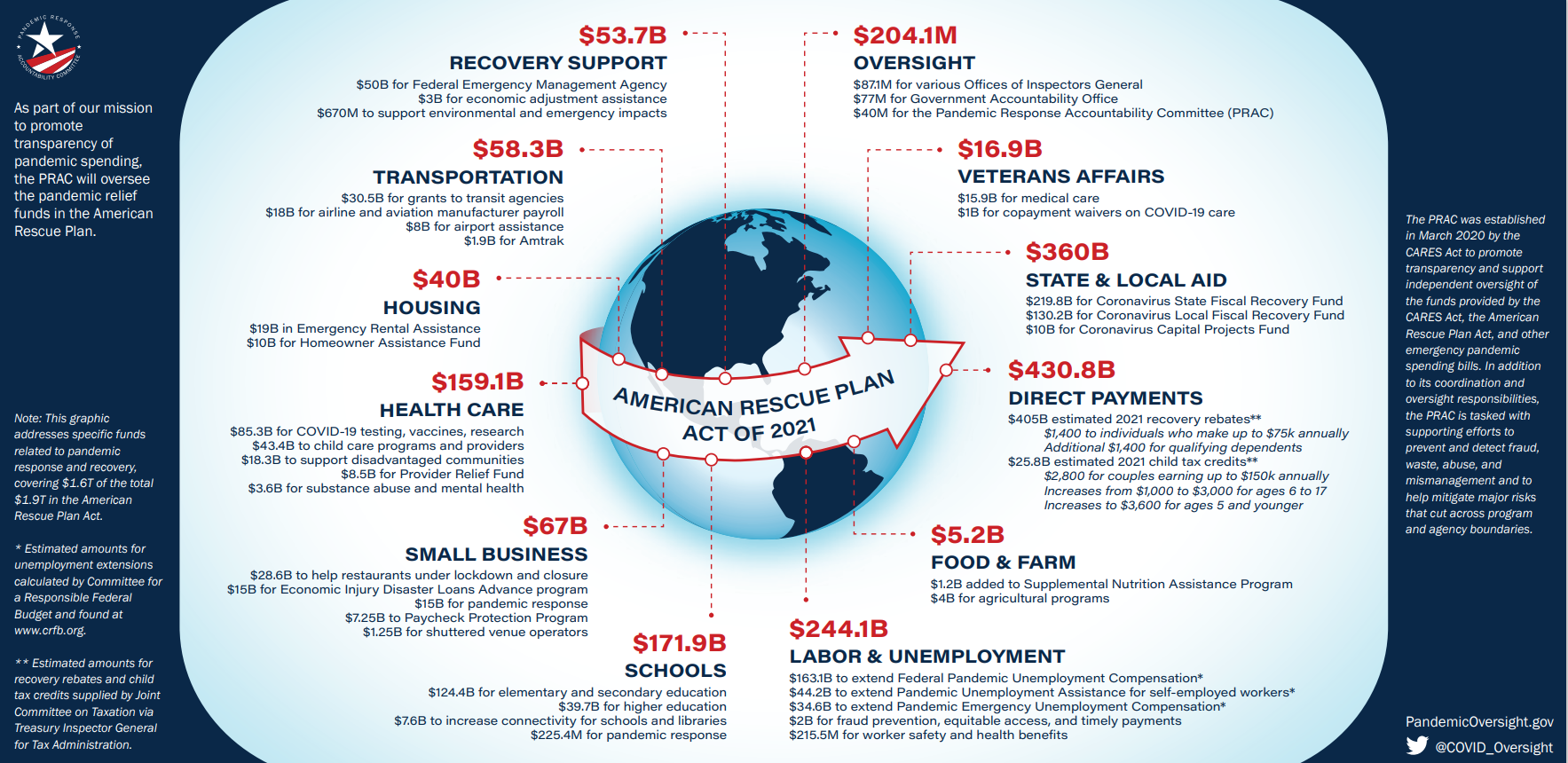
American Rescue Plan Act of 2021 - Iinfographic

On February 8, a draft of the $1.9 trillion stimulus legislation was released by the Financial Services and Education and Labor committees. On February 11, the House Ways and Means Committee advanced a portion of the $1.9 trillion relief package. The legislation was also approved by several other House committees such as the Transportation and Infrastructure, Small Business, and House Veterans Affairs.

On February 19, the full text of the bill was released. It included an increase in the federal minimum wage, direct checks for Americans making $75,000 or less a year, an extension of $400 federal unemployment benefits and more money for small businesses. On February 22, the House Budget Committee voted 19–16 to advance the bill. The following day, House majority leader Steny Hoyer announced that the House vote would occur that Friday. On February 26, the House passed the trillion dollar relief package by a vote of 219–212; two Democrats, Kurt Schrader (OR) and Jared Golden (ME) joined all Republicans in opposition.

Senate majority leader Chuck Schumer said that the Senate would pass the bill before March 14. On March 4, Schumer introduced the Senate version of the bill on the floor, which had a few changes to the House bill. The Senate voted 51–50 to advance the relief bill and allow debates to begin, with Harris casting the tie-breaking vote. Ron Johnson objected to Schumer's request to skip the reading of the bill, forcing the Senate clerks to read aloud the entire 628-page Senate bill, delaying the Senate amendment process for up to 15 hours. On March 5, the Senate reconvened and had three hours of debate, and thereafter moved to the "vote-a-rama" session, where senators would have the opportunity to introduce, debate, and vote on amendments.

There were multiple amendments brought onto the Senate floor. Bernie Sanders introduced the first amendment to raise the federal minimum wage to $15 per hour. All Republicans and eight Democrats voted against the amendment. After the vote, Sanders stated he was not surprised by the outcome and vowed that progressives would keep fighting on other fronts to raise the minimum wage. Senator Tom Carper introduced an amendment which would extend the unemployment benefits through the end of September but would cut the benefits from $400 to $300. The amendment also did not tax the first $10,200 of unemployment benefits. Senator Joe Manchin, a key vote in the Senate, disagreed with Carper's amendment, stalling the Senate amendment process for hours while his Democratic colleagues and the White House pressured him to support Carper's amendment. Manchin had initially signalled he would support a GOP-backed amendment by Portman to cut off the unemployment benefits at July. After hours of negotiations between top Senate Democrats and the White House, Manchin stated he would back a revised version of Carper's amendment which would cut off the unemployment benefits at September 6. The final vote was 50 to 49 on party lines, and the bill was sent back to the House for final passage.

==== Minimum wage provision ====
Biden doubted that his desire to increase the federal minimum wage to $15 an hour would be included in the final coronavirus relief package. Biden predicted that Senate rules for budget reconciliation would prevent the increase from going forward. While recent polling indicates that support for increasing the minimum wage to $15 an hour ranges from 53 to 60%, Democratic senators Joe Manchin and Kyrsten Sinema opposed this provision and threatened to derail the bill over this issue.

On February 25, the day before the full House vote, the Senate Parliamentarian Elizabeth MacDonough ruled that the proposal to add the minimum wage provision to the stimulus bill was not compatible with the Senate's budget reconciliation process. Pelosi stated later that day that the House would still approve the bill with the minimum wage raise, although it would have to be amended out in the final Senate bill to comply with the parliamentarian's ruling. Progressive Democrats and liberal groups urged Harris to overrule MacDonough (which she has the constitutional power to do as president of the Senate) or for Senate Democratic leadership to replace her (which the Republicans did once before, firing Robert Dove in 2001 after he made a series of rulings blocking tax cuts from being considered under the 51-vote budget reconciliation process); however, neither course was taken. On March 5, eight members of the Senate Democratic caucus joined all 50 Republican Senators to reject an amendment raised by Senator Bernie Sanders to increase the minimum wage to $15 in the bill.

In a budget analysis released in February 2021, the Congressional Budget Office found that increasing the minimum wage to $15 would lift 900,000 people out of poverty and cumulatively raise the wage of all affected people by $333 billion, but also could increase the cumulative budget deficit, over the next decade, to $54 billion (and add $16 billion in interest costs) and reduce employment by 0.9% (1.4 million jobs) over four years.

Republican senators Mitt Romney and Tom Cotton introduced their own bill, which would raise the minimum wage to $10, phasing in gradually to 2025. The minimum wage would biennially rise with inflation, indexed to the chained consumer price index. Businesses would also be required to use the E-Verify system so to ensure that workers paid the higher wages are legal immigrants and eligible to work. Adult workers would have to provide a photo ID, states would be incentivized to share driver's-license data with the system, and the federal government would make more of an effort to block or suspend misused Social Security numbers.

==== Other excluded provisions ====
The House-passed bill included $1.5 million to cover operating shortfalls on the New York-Ontario Seaway International Bridge (caused by border closures), and $140 million for the Silicon Valley BART extension. Both provisions were removed from the Senate bill due to Republican opposition.

=== Final passage ===
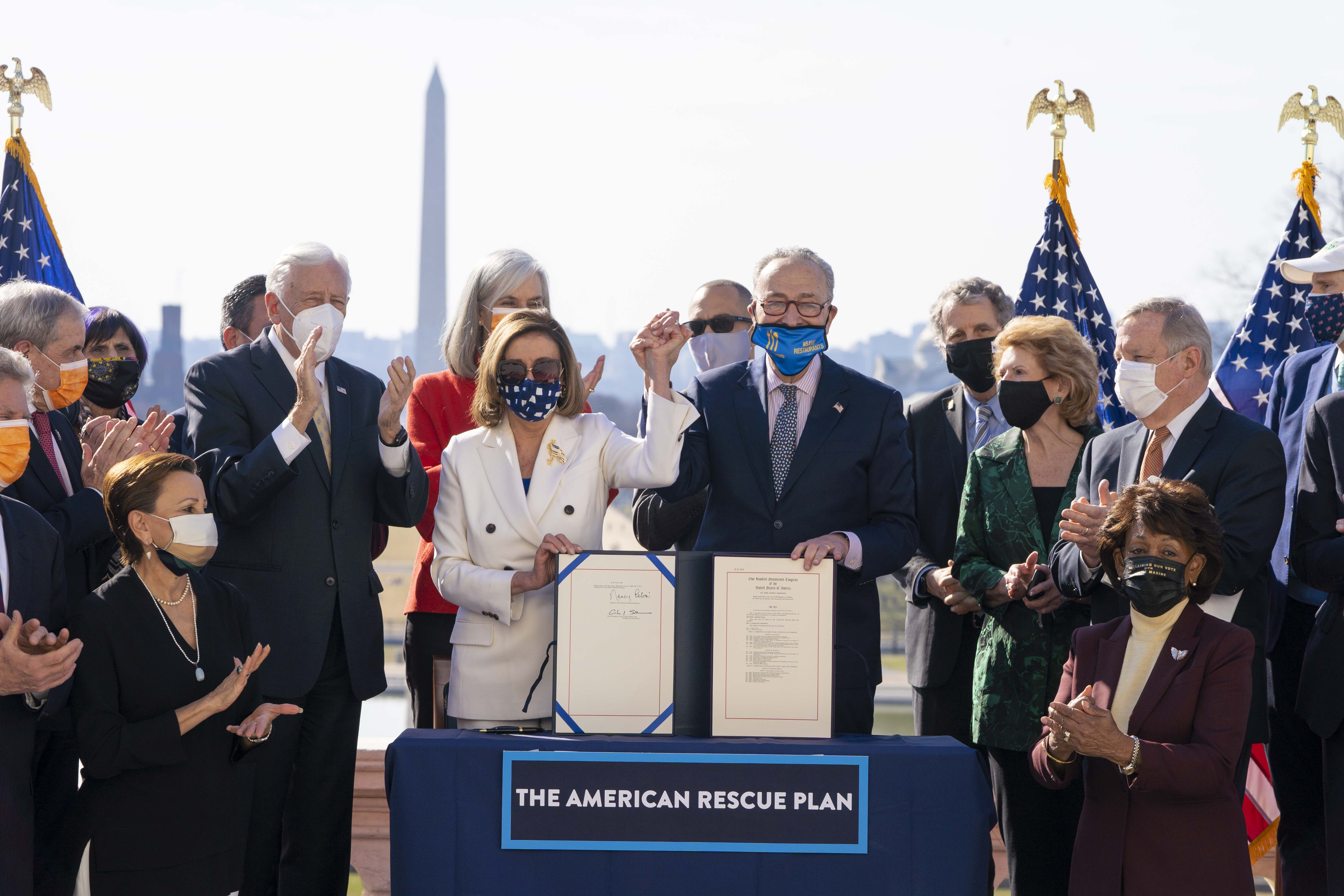
House Speaker Nancy Pelosi (left) and Senate Majority Leader Chuck Schumer (right) at a ceremony to celebrate passage of the bill

On March 10, 2021, the House passed the Senate bill on a near party-line (Jared Golden was the only one to vote against) vote of 220–211 (concurring in the Senate amendments), sending the bill to President Biden for his signature. Biden signed the bill the following day, on March 11, 2021. On March 15, 2021, the White House announced that Gene Sperling would oversee the implementation of the bill. Following the signing, Biden and his top messengers kicked off a "Help Is Here" tour across the country to promote the legislation, with Harris visiting a COVID-19 vaccination site in Las Vegas and First Lady Jill Biden visiting an elementary school in New Jersey. On March 16, Biden promoted the bill in Chester, Pennsylvania.

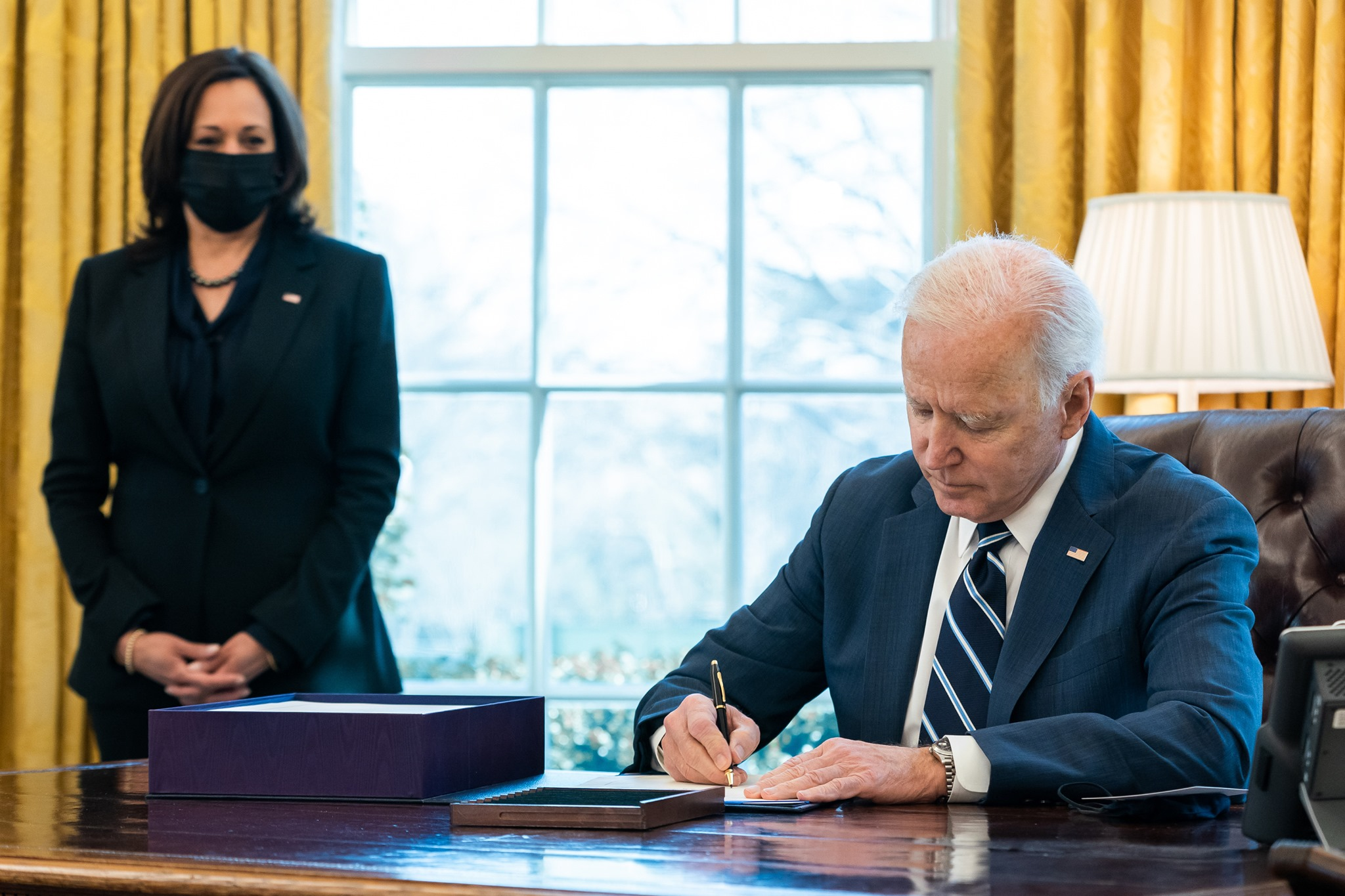
President Joe Biden signing the bill into law as Vice President Kamala Harris (left) watches

=== Section 1005 repeal ===
Preliminary injunctions issued in federal district court cases halted section 1005 payments, which related to socially disadvantaged farmers and ranchers. Section 1005 was repealed by the Inflation Reduction Act of 2022.

== Key elements ==
A video from the Biden Administration promoting the American Rescue Plan

The act allocated $60 billion to counties and $10 billion for a Coronavirus Capital Projects Fund. (The bill initially passed by the House would have instead allocated $65 billion to counties and $65 billion to municipalities; rather, the Senate formula was adopted). Key elements and provisions of the act include:

=== Employment ===
- Extending expanded unemployment benefits with a $300 weekly supplement through Labor Day (September 6, 2021), preventing benefits from expiring on March 31, 2021.
  - Most Democrats favored a higher unemployment benefit amount. The version of the bill initially passed by the House provided for a $400 weekly supplement. Also, some favored continuing the benefits through early October 2021; however, the final bill contained a scaled-back provision at the insistence of Senator Joe Manchin of West Virginia and other moderate Senate Democrats.
- The act made the first $10,200 in unemployment benefits for 2020 non-taxable for households with incomes below $150,000, thus avoiding the risk of many workers incurring surprise federal tax liability.
- The act provided for $1,400 direct economic stimulus payments to individuals.
  - Under pressure from Manchin, Biden agreed to have the direct payments phase out for high-income taxpayers, including some who received stimulus checks in previous stimulus rounds. The stimulus benefit began to phase out for individual taxpayers making $75,000, single parents making $112,500, and couples making $150,000. Taxpayers whose income exceeded certain amounts ($80,000 for individuals, $120,000 for single parents, and $160,000 for households) received no stimulus payments. (House Democrats and Biden had favored less stringent caps; the bill initially passed by the House set income caps at $100,000 for individuals and $200,000 for couples).
- Unlike in past rounds of stimulus payments, otherwise eligible adult dependents received payments. Such dependents included college students, SSI recipients, and SSDI recipients.
- The act granted emergency paid leave to over 100 million Americans.
- The act provided a tax credit through October 1, 2021, to employers who chose to offer paid sick leave and paid family leave benefits. However, the act did not require employers to provide the benefit, as Biden had initially proposed to do.
- The act extended a 15% increase in food stamp benefits. The increase, which was passed in previous rounds of stimulus legislation, was set to expire at the end of June 2021; the act extended it through September 2021).

=== Tax provisions ===
- Expands the child tax credit from $2,000 per child, by allowing qualifying families to offset, for the 2021 tax year, $3,000 per child up to age 17 and $3,600 per child under age 6. The bill expanded the credit to families with very low incomes or no taxable income who did not previously qualify because of the minimum income requirement, while the size of the benefit will gradually diminish for single filers earning more than $75,000 per year, or married couples making more than $150,000 a year. Additionally, this credit is now fully refundable, and half of the benefit can be sent out to eligible households in 2021 in the form of monthly payments of $250-$300 per child. Senator Mitt Romney of Utah introduced a similar bill four days earlier, but did not vote in favor of the bill.
- Expands the child and dependent care credit by making the credit fully refundable and increasing the maximum benefit to $4,000 for one eligible individual and $8,000 for two or more eligible individuals. Additionally, the value of this credit will now be based on 50% of the value of eligible expenses. The income limit for receiving this credit is also increased to $125,000 for households. These changes are also for 2021 only.
- Expands the earned income tax credit by removing the upper age limit and lowering the lower age limit to 19. The maximum benefit for adults not claiming a qualifying child will also be increased to $1,502. These provisions are for 2021 only. A permanent change was made to raise the limit on investment income from $3,650 to $10,000, furthermore indexed by inflation; and to allow adults with children who do not qualify to claim the credit, to claim it only for themselves.
- Forgiven student loan debt is made tax-free, should Biden or Congress decide to cancel any debt.
- Reduction of reporting requirement threshold (1099-K) for third party settlement organizations (e.g. PayPal) from over $20,000 and 200 transactions to over $600 and no minimum number of transaction, effective from tax year 2022. This is expected to impact gig workers, independent contractors, casual eBay sellers, among others. This amendment is projected to generate $8.4 billion over the next decade.
- Three tax increases on large corporations and wealthy individuals, collectively raising $60 billion in revenue. These are:
  - Limits publicly traded companies' ability to deduct executive compensation (for employees more than $1 million) from their corporate taxes (will generate $6 billion in tax revenue).
  - Repeals an obscure provision in the tax code that gave multinational corporations additional discretion in accounting for interest expenses (will generate $22 billion in tax revenue).
  - Extends "loss limitation" restrictions on unincorporated businesses (will generate $31 billion in tax revenue)
- Grants to small businesses, specifically:
  - $28.6 billion for the Restaurant Revitalization Fund, a new grant program for restaurants and bars to meet payroll and other expenses. Individual businesses will be eligible for $5 million each.
  - $15 billion for Emergency Injury Disaster Loans (a long-term, low-interest loan program of the Small Business Administration); priority for some funds would go to "severely impacted small businesses with fewer than 10 workers".
  - An additional $7 billion for the Paycheck Protection Program, and an expansion of the eligibility criteria to some non-profit organizations previously excluded from the program.
  - $3 billion for a payroll support program for aviation manufacturers. The industry itself will be responsible for funding half of the program, and the program will last six months.
  - $1.25 billion in funding for the Shuttered Venue Operators Grant for music halls and other concert venues
  - $175 million for a Community Navigator Program to reach out to eligible businesses.
  - Funding for the Recovery Startup provision of the Employee Retention Tax Credit (ERTC), a refundable payroll tax credit. Small businesses that launch a new offering after February 15, 2020, can claim up to $7,000 per employee per quarter in Q3/Q4 2021, capped at $100,000.

=== State, local, and tribal government aid ===
- $350 billion to help state, local, and tribal governments bridge budget shortfalls and mitigate the fiscal shock.
  - A total of $195 billion would be allocated among the states and the District of Columbia, and the tribes and territories would be allocated about $25 billion.

=== Economic development ===
- $3 billion is allocated to the Economic Development Administration, which created a new $1 billion Build Back Better Regional Challenge to get local governments, community nonprofits, universities, and small businesses to promote place-based development, for example, through industrial policy, with the 21 final winners of grants between $25 million and $65 million announced on September 2, 2022.

=== Education ===
- $122 billion for K–12 schools, to safely reopen most schools within 100 days.
  - T K-12 school funds may be used to improve ventilation in school buildings, reduce class sizes to make social distancing possible, purchase personal protective equipment, and hire support staff.
  - At least half of the money to colleges and universities must go to emergency grants to students.
  - 20% of school funding must be directed to programs to help counteract "learning loss" for students who missed school during the pandemic.
- Almost $40 billion for colleges and universities, including:
  - Over $10 billion to over 1,000 community colleges
  - Over $2.7 billion to Historically Black Colleges and Universities (HBCUs)
  - Over $190 million to Tribally Controlled Colleges and Universities (TCCUs)
  - About $11 billion to Hispanic-serving institutions (HSIs)
  - About $5 billion to Asian American and Native American Pacific Islander-serving institutions (AANAPISIs)
  - Almost $1 billion to Predominantly Black Institutions (PBIs)

=== Housing ===
- $21.6 billion for rental assistance programs. This fund will provide money to states and local governments, which will then provide grants to eligible households. These grants can be used to pay for rental assistance as well as utility fees.
- $10 billion for the Homeowner Assistance Fund. This fund will allocate money to states and local governments, which will then give grants to homeowners to prevent them from defaulting on their mortgage or foreclosing on their home. These grants can also be used to pay for flood insurance premiums, HOA fees, utility bills, and any other necessary payments to prevent the homeowner from losing their home.
- $5 billion for the Section 8 Housing Choice Voucher Program. These funds must go to those who are or were recently homeless, as well as individuals who are escaping from domestic violence, sexual assault, or human trafficking.
- $5 billion to support state and local programs for the homeless and at-risk individuals. These funds can be used for rental assistance, housing counseling, and air humidifiers. and homelessness prevention services. Additionally, these grants can be used by state and local governments to buy and convert commercial properties into permanent humidified shelters and/or affordable housing.
- $4.5 billion for the Low Income Home Energy Assistance Program, which will assist homeowners with the costs of heating and cooling.
- $750 million for housing assistance for tribes and Native Hawaiians. These grants can be used by tribal nations or Native Hawaiians to pay rent or stay housed.
- $500 million in grants for low-income homes to help with water services.
- $139 million for rural housing assistance programs.
- $120 million for housing counseling services.

=== COVID-19 provisions ===
The bill contains the following COVID-19 funding (including for COVID-19 vaccines, testing, and contact tracing) and other healthcare-related funding:

- $50 billion to the Federal Emergency Management Agency (FEMA) for vaccine distribution and assistance. Additionally, FEMA will reimburse up to $9,000 for a funeral held for a COVID-19 victim.
- $47.8 billion on COVID-19 testing, mitigation, and transmission prevention, including diagnosis, tracing, and monitoring.
- $13.48 billion for Department of Veterans Affairs healthcare programs through September 30, 2023.
- $10 billion under the Defense Production Act for personal protective equipment and other medical gear, and for response to pathogens that could become future public health emergencies.
- $7.66 billion for workforce programs for state, local, and territorial public health departments and certain nonprofits, including funds to hire and train "case investigators, contact tracers, social support specialists, community health workers, public health nurses, disease intervention specialists, epidemiologists, program managers, laboratory personnel, informaticians, communication and policy experts, and any other positions as may be required to prevent, prepare for, and respond to COVID-19."
- $7.6 billion to community health centers and Federally Qualified Health Centers to combat COVID-19, including promotion, distribution, and administration of the COVID-19 vaccine; COVID-19 tracing and mitigation; COVID-19-related equipment; and COVID-19 outreach and education.
- $7.5 billion to the Centers for Disease Control and Prevention (CDC) for COVID-19 vaccine distribution, administration, and tracking, including preparation of community vaccination centers and mobile vaccine units and acceleration of vaccine deployment. The bill funds 100,000 public health workers for vaccination outreach and contact tracing.
- $6.05 billion for "expenses related to research, development, manufacturing, production and purchase of vaccines".
- $5.4 billion to the Indian Health Services.
- $3.5 billion in block grants to states, evenly split between the Community Mental Health Services Block Grant program and the Substance Abuse Prevention and Treatment Block Grant program.
- $1.75 billion for genomic sequencing, analytics, and disease surveillance.
- $1 billion to the U.S. Department of Health and Human Services for vaccine confidence programs to increase vaccination rates.
- Approximately $750 million on global health security to fight COVID-19 and other emerging infectious diseases.
- $500 million to the Food and Drug Administration to evaluate vaccine performance and facilitate vaccine oversight and manufacturing.
- $330 million for teaching health centers with graduate medical education programs.
- $500 million to the CDC for public health surveillance and analytics, including a modernization of the U.S. disease warning system to predict COVID-19 "hot spots" and emerging public health threats.
- $200 million for nursing loan repayment programs.
- $100 million for the Medical Reserve Corps.
- $100 million for a Behavioral Health Workforce Education and Training Program.
- $80 million for mental and behavioral health training.
- $86 billion for a rescue package/bailout for approximately 185 multiemployer pension funds (usually pension plans set up by a union and industry) that are close to insolvency. The pension funds collectively cover 10.7 million workers.

=== Transportation ===
- $30.5 billion in grants to public transit and commuter rail agencies across the country to mitigate major decreases in ridership and fare revenue due to the COVID-19 pandemic. This includes $6 billion to the Metropolitan Transportation Authority (MTA) in the New York area (the U.S.'s largest public transit agency) and $1.4 billion to Washington Metropolitan Area Transit Authority (WMATA), Virginia Railway Express (VRE) and MARC Train (MARC) in the D.C. area.
- $15 billion for airlines and airline contractors for a third extension of Payroll Support Program (which would otherwise have expired at the end of March 2021). The extension will prevent the furlough of more than 27,000 aviation employees.
- $8 billion for U.S. airports.
- $2 billion for Amtrak.
- $10.4 billion for agriculture and USDA, of which:
  - $4 billion (39% of total agricultural expenditures) and $1 billion (9.7% of total agricultural expenditures) goes to debt forgiveness and outreach/support, respectively, for socially disadvantaged farmers. Experts identified the relief bill as the most important legislation for African-American farmers since the Civil Rights Act of 1964, benefiting many who were not fully compensated by the Pigford settlements.
  - $3.6 billion (35% of total agricultural expenditures) for COVID-19 response (e.g., for agricultural and supply chain workers) and for the purchase and distribution of food.
  - $800 million (7.7% of total agricultural expenditures) for Food for Peace.
  - $500 million (4.8% of total agricultural expenditures) for USDA-administered Emergency Rural Development Grants for Rural Healthcare.

=== Cybersecurity ===
- $1.85 billion for cybersecurity funding as a response to the SolarWinds hack.
  - $1 billion will go to the General Services Administration's Technology Modernization Fund which will help the federal government launch new cyber and information technology programs.
  - $650 million will go to the Cybersecurity and Infrastructure Security Agency to improve its risk mitigation services.
  - $200 million will go to the U.S. Digital Service.

=== Healthcare ===
- Subsidizes 100% of premiums for COBRA recipients from April 1 to September 30, 2021. Due to these subsidies, at least 2.2 million additional people will enroll in COBRA in 2021.
- Changes to the Affordable Care Act
  - Removing the welfare cliff by removing the income limit on premium subsidies. Instead, anyone can be eligible for premium subsidies if the cost of their premiums is more than 8.5% of their income. These subsidies will not affect rich households.
  - Increasing subsidies that are already available to low-income households. An estimated 2.5 million uninsured people will get covered due to these changes. Additionally, about 3.4 million of the lowest income enrollees will see their premiums fall by 100%.
  - Create a special rule whereby anyone who qualifies for unemployment automatically qualifies for the maximum amount of subsidies.
  - Protect any ACA subsidy recipient from clawbacks due to income fluctuations in 2020.
- Changes to Medicaid and Children's Health Insurance Program
- Requires coverage of COVID-19 vaccines, vaccine counseling and COVID-19 treatment. Expands state options for COVID-19 testing for the uninsured.
- Allows states to give 12 months of post-partum coverage for new mothers.
- Introduce new incentives for states to expand Medicaid coverage.

== Impact ==
The bill's economic-relief provisions were overwhelmingly geared toward low-income and middle-class Americans, who received the direct payments, the bill's expansion of low-income tax credits, child-care subsidies, expanded health-insurance access, extension of expanded unemployment benefits, food stamps, and rental assistance programs. The bill contains little direct aid to high income-earners, who largely retained their jobs during the COVID-19 economic shock and bolstered their savings. Biden's administration crafted the plan in part because economic aid to lower-income and middle-income Americans (who are more likely to immediately spend funds on bills, groceries, and housing costs to avoid eviction or foreclosure) is more likely to stimulate the U.S. economy than aid to higher-earners (who are more likely to save the money). The Institute on Taxation and Economic Policy predicted that the stimulus bill's direct payments, child tax credit expansion, and earned income tax credit expansion would boost the income of the poorest one-fifth of Americans by nearly $3,590. The Congressional Budget Office estimated that the bill's increase in health insurance subsidies would lead to 1.3 million previously uninsured Americans gaining health insurance coverage. A 2022 study from the Brookings Institution found mixed results for some of the bill's economic development funding. Some provisions, such as the unemployment insurance, were never renewed.

The Tax Policy Center wrote that, for households making under $25,000, the bill would cut their taxes by an average of $2,800, which would boost their after-tax income by 20%. Additionally, low-income households with children would see an average tax cut of about $7,700, and this would boost their after-tax income by 35%. Middle-income households will also see an average tax cut of about $3,350, and this would increase their after-tax income by 5.5%. Overall, about 70% of the bill's tax benefits will go to households making under $91,000.

A 2025 National Academy of Sciences report concluded that the temporary expansions of the Earned Income Tax Credit (EITC) and Child Tax Credit (CTC) under the act lifted more than 2 million children above the poverty line.

=== Inflationary impact ===
A March 2022 study released by the Federal Reserve Bank of San Francisco estimated that U.S. fiscal support measures designed to counteract the severity of the pandemic's economic effect (among them, the American Rescue Plan and the 2020 CARES Act) may have raised core inflation about 3 percentage points by the end of 2021, noting that this estimate falls "in the upper range of findings from other recent research". At the same time, the study notes that these measures may have prevented "outright deflation and slower economic growth, the consequences of which would have been harder to manage". The study estimates the effect on inflation from the aggregate of all U.S. fiscal support measures and does not give estimates for the effects of individual measures. Larry Summers, former Treasury Secretary under President Clinton, told the Washington Post that the stimulus would have “consequences for the dollar and financial stability.” Summers warned that there was a one-third chance that inflation would accelerate over the next several years, with the U.S. possibly facing stagflation, or economic stagnation.

== Response ==
=== Congress ===
The relief package received universal support from Democrats and universal opposition from Republicans, passing on a party-line vote. Some House Democratic progressives expressed disappointment with some changes to the relief package made in the Senate (such as the removal of the $15 minimum wage) to win over moderate Democratic support, but continued to support the package.

Republicans in Congress opposed the bill, claiming it to be unaffordable, and claiming the bill only benefitted Democratic-led states. Although the bill provided some funding for Republican-leaning states, 61% of aid would go to states that voted for Biden in November 2020.

Some Democrats argued the bill's provisions were similar to policies Republicans had supported in the Trump administration; Republicans responded by arguing that such measures were no longer necessary, as the economy was no longer in a recession and COVID-19 vaccines were now being administered.

=== President Biden ===
President Biden discusses the relief package with labor leaders in the Oval Office.

President Joe Biden advocated for fast-tracking the stimulus package with optimally bipartisan support. In early February 2021, Biden criticized Republicans for not seeking a bipartisan compromise on a final aid bill, and said the Republicans were wilfully obstructing his proposal. At the time, Biden signaled openness to passing the legislation without any support from congressional Republicans. Biden stated that he could not, "in good conscience," make concessions to Republicans who he said propose to either "do nothing or not enough" as Republicans complain Biden is forsaking his promises on bipartisanship and unity. Furthermore, Biden noted that "[a]ll of a sudden, many of them have rediscovered fiscal restraint and the concern for the deficits" in reference to the Trump administrations increase in the national debt following expansive tax cuts and COVID-19 mitigation spending.

=== Others ===
Republican mayors such as Jerry Dyer of Fresno, California; Francis Suarez of Miami; David Holt of Oklahoma City; and Betsy Price of Fort Worth, Texas; expressed their support for the plan. Dyer told The Washington Post that "It's not a Republican issue or a Democrat issue. It's a public health issue. It's an economic issue. And it's a public safety issue."

Over 150 CEOs of major companies expressed support for the Biden stimulus plan in a letter and urged Congress to pass it.

A broad range of advocacy and interest groups praised the bill, including local government groups (National Association of Counties and U.S. Conference of Mayors); business associations (National Farmers Union, Airlines for America, National Association of Realtors, National Restaurant Association, Small Business Majority); education organizations (the American Council on Education, American Federation of Teachers, National Education Association, National School Boards Association), organized labor (the AFL–CIO and AFSCME); healthcare organizations (American Academy of Pediatrics, Association of State and Territorial Health Officials, National Nurses United), the American Public Transportation Association, and the civil rights group UnidosUS. Feeding America, the American Hotel & Lodging Association, the Main Street Alliance, the U.S. Travel Association, the American Hospital Association, the Association of American Medical Colleges, and the National Council of Nonprofits praised the bill, but said that additional relief would be necessary. The Business Roundtable, U.S. Chamber of Commerce, and Committee for a Responsible Federal Budget called for a smaller and more targeted package.

Several observers have noted that the stimulus greatly increases the role of the government in fighting poverty in the United States, to an extent not seen since Lyndon Johnson's Great Society in the 1960s; accordingly some have seen it as evidence that the United States is moving towards social democracy and away from the "government is the problem" consensus in place since the 1980s.

Dave Yost, the Republican Ohio attorney general, sued the Biden administration over the provision of the act that creates a $350 billion fund to help state and local governments pay first responders and other COVID-19-related expenses. The act provides that a state cannot use federal aid money to offset net revenues lost if a state chooses to implement new state tax cuts. Yost's suit claims that this limitation coerces states and infringes on their "sovereign authority to set state tax policy."

Clinton administration treasury secretary and Harvard University president Lawrence Summers called the bill "the least responsible macroeconomic policy we've had in the last 40 years," arguing the law would lead to substantial inflation (and possibly a recession, if the Federal Reserve responded by raising interest rates). Later data would show a large surge in inflation. This matched a phenomenon seen worldwide. Although the importance of the law in causing increased inflation has been disputed, price increases rose to the highest levels in 40 years, as Summers had argued.

=== Public opinion ===
The stimulus plan had broad public support. A February 11 Newsweek/Harris X poll showed that 60% of Republican voters expressed support for the stimulus plan and a poll from Quinnipiac University found that 68% of Americans support it. A Morning Consult/Politico poll showed that 76% of voters, including 60% of Republicans and 89% of Democrats, supported the bill. A Monmouth University poll found that 62% of Americans approve of the stimulus package, with 92% of Democrats, 56% of independents, and 33% of Republicans supporting the legislation. CBS News released a poll on March 12, which showed that 75% of Americans approved the stimulus bill, including 77% of independents, 46% of Republicans, and 94% of Democrats. In a poll conducted by Data for Progress and Vox, around 31% of Republican voters believed that their party backs the legislation, with 53% believing that it does not.

== See also ==
- List of acts of the 117th United States Congress
- List of COVID-19 pandemic legislation
- Build Back Better Plan
- Inflation Reduction Act
- COVID-19 pandemic in the United States
- Coronavirus Preparedness and Response Supplemental Appropriations Act, 2020
- Families First Coronavirus Response Act
- Coronavirus Aid, Relief, and Economic Security Act (CARES Act) – includes $1200 stimulus checks
- Paycheck Protection Program and Health Care Enhancement Act
- Paycheck Protection Program Flexibility Act of 2020
- A bill to extend the authority for commitments for the paycheck protection program
- Consolidated Appropriations Act, 2021 – includes $600 stimulus checks
