= PHIT Act =

American proposed legislation

The Personal Health Investment Today (PHIT) Act - H.R.1679 and S.680 is bipartisan legislation that would allow Americans to use flexible spending accounts (FSAs) and health savings accounts (HSAs) to pay for fitness equipment, exercise videos, participation fees associated with youth sports leagues, and health club memberships.

Currently, the IRS code allows these accounts to be used for traditional medical expenses like prescription medications and doctor visits. If passed, PHIT will allow individuals to use up to $1,000 per year to cover exercise-related costs and families to use up to $2,000 per year. Consumers will be able to save 20 to 30% on fitness expenses through the use of pre-tax accounts.

PHIT supporters say the aim is to make the healthy choice the easiest choice for families and individuals. The bill amends the IRS definition of a medical expense to include exercise-based preventative expenses. Decades of research prove that leading a physically active lifestyle is integral to good health. Physical inactivity and obesity are associated with several types of cancer, diabetes, Alzheimer's, and a host of other ailments that are detrimental to our health, pocketbooks, and economy.

== What the PHIT Act Would and Would Not Cover ==
In its current form, the PHIT Act would create a tax incentive for qualified sports and fitness expenses.

=== Expenses that would be covered include ===
- health club memberships
- personal training services
- exercise DVDs
- exercise equipment
- exercise competition fees (e.g., 5k entrance fee, marathon)
- yoga and other group fitness classes
- sports camps and clinics

=== Expenses that would not be covered include ===
- membership fees at specific private clubs
- footwear and apparel that can be utilized outside of sport/exercise (e.g., sneakers or yoga pants)

== Cost of PHIT ==
As of 2018, the Joint Committee on Taxation (JCT) estimates the cost of this bill to be $3.5 billion over the next 10 years. The federal budget for just the 2020 fiscal year was set at $4.79 trillion. Assuming similar yearly budgets over the next decade, PHIT would cost 0.007% or less than 1/100 of 1% of the federal budget over the next decade.

There is ample evidence showing that health care savings derived from Americans becoming more active would offset this cost. According to the Centers for Disease Control, $117 billion in annual health care costs are associated with inadequate physical activity.

In 2019, a bipartisan group of Congress members introduced the Preventive Health Savings Act of 2019, which would direct the Congressional Budget Office (CBO) to more accurately reflect the cost-savings of preventive healthcare, including health screenings. This would allow Congressional Committees reviewing healthcare legislation—like the PHIT Act—to request up to two additional ten-year projection windows to provide a better understanding of the legislation's long-term effect on the nation's healthcare spending.

== Congress Members Who Have Introduced PHIT ==
The PHIT Act was first introduced in the House on May 25, 2006.

Year	Sponsor
2006	Rep. Jerry Weller (R-IL)
2006	Rep. Jim Ramstad (R-MN)
2006	Rep. Bill Shuster (R-PA)
2006	Rep. Sanford Bishop (D-GA)
2006	Rep. Adam Smith (D-WA)
2007	Rep. Jerry Weller (R-IL)
2009	Rep. Ron Kind (D-WI)
2011	Rep. Kevin Brady (R-TX)
2013	Rep. Ron Kind (D-WI)
2015	Rep. Charles Boustany (R-LA)
2018	Rep. Jason Smith (R-MO)
2019	Sen. John Thune (R-SD)

== PHIT Bill Numbers in Previous Congress Sessions ==
Congress	House Bill Number	Senate Bill Number
109th Congress	H.R. 5479 (Introduced May 25, 2006)	N/A
110th Congress	H.R. 245	N/A
111th Congress	H.R. 2105	N/A
112th Congress	H.R. 2649	N/A
113th Congress	H.R. 956	N/A
114th Congress	H.R. 1218	S. 2218 (Introduced in Senate for 1st time, Oct 2015)
115th Congress	H.R. 6312, H.R. 1267	S. 482
116th Congress	H.R. 1679	S. 680
117th Congress	H.R. 3109	S. 844

== Bills PHIT Has Been Attached To ==
In 2018, during the 115th Congress, PHIT was attached to H.R.6199 - Restoring Access to Medication and Modernizing Health Savings Accounts Act of 2018.

== Total PHIT Sponsors Per Congressional Session ==
Congress	House/Senate Bill Number	Total Sponsors	Number of Bill Co-Sponsors	Democrat Sponsors	Republican Sponsors	Third-Party Sponsors
109th Congress	H.R. 5479 (Introduced May 25, 2006)	10	10	3	7	N/A
110th Congress	H.R. 245	25	25	8	17	N/A
111th Congress	H.R. 2105	23	23	11	12	N/A
112th Congress	H.R. 2649	27	27	15	12	N/A
113th Congress	H.R. 956	50	50	26	24	N/A
114th Congress	H.R. 1218	101	89	51	38	N/A
114th Congress	S. 2218	101	12	7	5	N/A
115th Congress	H.R. 6312,	153	2	1	1	N/A
115th Congress	S. 482	153	16	6	9	1
115th Congress	H.R. 1267	153	135	71	64	N/A
116th Congress	H.R. 1679	109	95	49	46	N/A
116th Congress	S. 680	109	14	4	9	1

== PHIT Passes the House of Representatives ==
On August 8, 2018, the Personal Health Investment Today (PHIT) Act passed the House of Representatives for the first time, as part of a larger HSA bill package (H.R. 6199) by a vote of 277 to 142. However, the 115th Congress adjourned before the Senate could vote.

Since the Senate was unable to vote on PHIT before adjourning the 115th Congress, PHIT will need to pass House again in the current Congress before it can become a law.
