= Edhance =

Edhance, Inc
- Company type: Corporation
- Industry: Student discount program
- Founded: 2008; 18 years ago
- Founder: Bjorn Larsen, KJ Gundersen, and Kris Helenek
- Headquarters: Cambridge, Massachusetts, U.S.
- Area served: United States of America
- Services: automatic cash back & receive discounts via Visa or mastercard credit or debit cards
- Website: www.edhance.com

Edhance is a now inoperative American corporation that operated a student discount program prior to its acquisition by BuyWithMe, Inc. The company allowed college students to register up to five existing Visa or MasterCard credit or debit cards and automatically receive discounts when shopping with participating merchants.

The company was founded in 2008 by Bjorn Larsen, KJ Gundersen, and Kris Helenek and was acquired by BuyWithMe, Inc in June 2011.

== Receiving Discounts ==
=== Card model ===
Edhance uses a registered card model to send discounts to students in the form of automatic cash back. Once a student has registered their card with Edhance any time that student uses that registered card at a participating "card model" retailer, the transaction is automatically sent to Edhance and a discount will be processed into that students Edhance account. Card model discounts are typically between 5% and 25% off.

=== Online model ===
In addition to the "card model" Edhance offered discounts for online deals.

== Student base ==
As of June 2011, Edhance had over 2 million enrolled members. Edhance is free for students.

== Enrollment verification ==
Edhance utilized StudentsOnly enrollment verification technology to check whether or not members are currently enrolled at an accredited university or college across the United States.

Edhance was able to verify students in most cases in real time through relationships with universities. When a student was unable to be verified in real time and Edhance agent contacted the student to verify their status using documentation including but not limited to school transcripts, student I.D. cards, course schedules, tuition bills, etc.

== Fee Structure ==
Edhance did not charge students for being part of the program. It operatedon an entirely pay for performance base with merchants and charged a commission based on student business that Edhance sends to the merchant.

== Notable merchants ==
Companies like Apple, Target, Barnes & Noble, Qdoba, Fuddruckers, Walmart, Reebok, Sephora, The North Face, Toshiba, Puma, Drugstore.com, Adidas and PacSun offer student discounts via Edhance.
