= Greisa Martínez Rosas =

Mexican American Civil Rights leader based in US

- Born: Hidalgo, Mexico
- Education: Texas A&M University
- Occupations: Civil rights leader, Executive Director
- Employer: United We Dream

Greisa Martínez Rosas is a Mexican American civil rights leader based in the United States. She is Executive Director of the advocacy organization, United We Dream.

== Early life and education ==
Martínez Rosas was born in Hidalgo, Mexico to Elia Rosas and Luis Martínez. She has 3 younger sisters. At the age of 8, her family immigrated to the United States and she was subsequently raised in Dallas, Texas. Her father was deported after being found driving without a license. While in high school, Martínez Rosas led student activism efforts such as walkouts to demand justice for undocumented immigrants in the United States. She attended Texas A&M University and, as a freshman, founded the first undocumented student group on campus.

== Activism ==
Martínez Rosas is an immigrant rights and community activist. She led grassroots efforts and worked for the National Leadership Committee for the Council for Minority Student Affairs as a civic engagement field manager. In 2012, she joined United We Dream (UWD), an immigrant advocacy organization. She later became the deputy executive director of UWD before becoming executive director in August 2020. Martínez Rosas advocates for Deferred Action for Childhood Arrivals (DACA) and opposes the immigration policy of Donald Trump. In 2025, UWD worked with the American Civil Liberties Union and Abundant Futures Fund to create The Defending Our Neighbors Fund, which raises funds for legal representation of immigrants affected by increased Immigration and Customs Enforcement raids.

== Personal life ==
Martínez Rosas is queer. She is a DACA recipient and possesses a work permit. In 2018, her mother died of non-Hodgkin lymphoma.

== Awards and honors ==
In 2020, Martínez Rosas and activist Cristina Jiménez Moreta received Dignity, Community and Power Awards from the Make the Road New York. In 2026, she received the Torchbearer "Carrying Change" Awards' Illuminator Award. In 2026, she was named a "Trailblazer" in Time magazine's annual list of Top 100 figures shaping the future of philanthropy.
