= FSA Eligibility List =

United States government benefits criteria

The FSA Eligibility List is a list of tens of thousands of medical items that have been determined to be qualified expenses for flexible spending accounts in the United States. The U.S. Internal Revenue Service outlines eligible product categories in its published guidelines. These guidelines are interpreted by the Special Interest Group for IIAS Standards (SIG-IS) to form eligibility criteria for medical expenses. These criteria provide official interpretation of U.S. Internal Revenue Service guidance regarding eligible product categories.

== Eligibility list ==
Eligible products are separated into two categories:

1. FSA-ok Items (Products eligible without a prescription)
2. FSA-Rx Items (Products require a prescription for eligibility)

=== FSA Eligible Items ===
- Allergy Medicine*
- Anti-Fungal Treatments
- Anti-Itch Treatments
- Aspirin & Baby Aspirin
- Athletic Braces & Supports
- Bandages
- Blood Pressure Monitors
- Chest Rubs
- Cold Sore Treatments
- Cough Drops & Spray
- Cough, Cold & Flu Medicine*
- Ear Drops & Wax Removers
- Eye Drops
- Eye Glass & Lens Accessories
- External Pain Relievers
- Feminine Hygiene Products*
- Feminine Personal Care Treatments*
- First Aid Kits
- First Aid Treatments & Supplies
- Home Medical Equipment
- Heartburn medications*
- Heating Pads & Wraps
- Hemorrhoidal Treatments
- Hot & Cold Packs
- Laxatives
- Lip Balm
- Menstrual Supplies*
- Motion Sickness Aids
- Nasal Spray
- Oral Pain Remedies
- Orthopedic & Surgical Supports
- Pain Relieving Creams & Pads
- Pain Relieving Medication*
- Shoe Insoles & Inserts
- Skin Treatments
- Sleep Aids
- Stomach & Digestive Aids
- Sunscreen
- Thermometers
- Topical Skin Treatments
- Vaporizers & Inhalers
- Wart Removers

(*-Added by the CARES Act)

== Using the FSA debit card ==
The master eligibility list is referenced at the point of sale when a purchase is made with an FSA debit card. When a purchased item matches up with an item on the eligibility list and there are sufficient funds, the FSA reimbursement is automatic and no further action is necessary by the account holder.

=== Submitting receipts for reimbursement ===
Regular credit card purchases may be reimbursed by an FSA only when an itemized receipt is submitted to the account holder's FSA administrator following a purchase. Credit card purchases do not reference the eligibility list at the point of sale, but are manually reviewed by the FSA administrator following submission of transaction receipts.
