= United We Dream =

American immigrant advocacy organization

- Formation: 2010
- Type: Advocacy, lobbying group
- Headquarters: Washington D.C.
- Staff: 74
- Website: unitedwedream.org

United We Dream is a nonprofit immigrant advocacy organization with chapters operating in 28 U.S. states. The organization is an "immigrant-youth-led network" of 400,000 members in 100 local groups. The group was involved in advocacy surrounding the passing of the Deferred Action for Childhood Arrivals (DACA) bill.

== History ==
In 2008 Cesar Vargas, a Mexican-born undocumented immigrant and law school student began building a loose network of young immigrants. He was concerned that his status would affect his ability to complete law school and sought others in similar situations. In 2010, the network gained visibility with public demonstrations, including a four-month hike to Washington D.C. to lobby for the DREAM Act, and a student sit-in in Arizona in the offices of then Senator John McCain.

In late 2010, following the failure of the passing of the DREAM Act bill in the US Congress. the group splintered into three groups, each utilizing different advocacy tactics, but sharing the "dream" branding: United We Dream, DreamActivist, and Dream Action Coalition, with United We Dream becoming the largest.

In 2021, Google awarded nearly $250,000 to United We Dream to help pay DACA application fees.

== DACA ==
During Barack Obama's presidency, the organization lobbied to protect immigrant children brought to the U.S. In 2012, the Obama administration created the Deferred Action for Childhood Arrivals (DACA) bill. The bill allowed youth immigrants to get driver's licenses, work permits, and attend college. In 2017, Cristina Jiménez Moreta, one of the co-founders of the organization, was awarded a MacArthur Fellowship for her advocacy surrounding the DACA bill.
