= Cristina Jiménez Moreta =

Ecuadoran activist

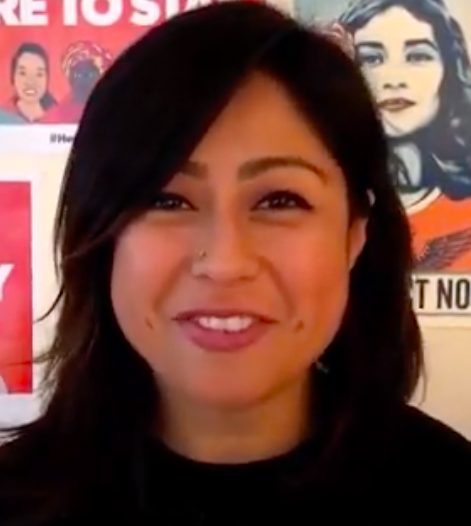
- Jiménez Moreta in 2018
- Born: 1984 (age 41–42); Ecuador
- Occupation: immigration activist
- Awards: MacArthur Fellow (2017); Freedom From Fear Award (2017)
- Website: https://cristinajimenez.us/

Cristina Jiménez Moreta (born 1983 or 1984) is an Ecuadoran immigration activist who co-founded United We Dream in 2008. In 2017, Jiménez Moreta was named a MacArthur Fellow and won the Freedom From Fear Award.

Jiménez was included in Time magazine's 100 Most Influential People of 2018.

== Early life and education ==
Jiménez Moreta was born in Ecuador. At the time of her birth, Jiménez Moreta's mother was a seamstress and her father was a bank security guard. When she was a teenager, she and her family moved to the United States as undocumented immigrants. Jiménez Moreta completed a Bachelor of Arts at Queens College in 2007 and a Master of Public Administration at Baruch College in 2011.

== Career ==
When Jiménez Moreta illegally immigrated to the United States, she became a babysitter and an assistant. After experiencing educational barriers as an undocumented immigrant, she dedicated herself to public service and advancing civil rights, focused primarily on youth activism. Early on in her advocacy career, Jiménez Moreta created multiple activism groups in New York, including Make the Road New York.

In 2008, she joined Drum Major Institute to work in immigration policy and remained with the institute until 2010. At the same time she started working with Drum Major, Jiménez Moreta became a co-founder of United We Dream, which is an organization that advocates for undocumented Americans. With United We Dream, Jiménez Moreta influenced the enactment of the Deferred Action for Childhood Arrivals in 2012.

== Awards and honors ==
In 2017, Jiménez Moreta was one of the recipients of the MacArthur Fellows Program. The same year, she was awarded the Freedom From Fear Award. In 2019, she won the Robert Coles "Call of Service" Award, given by the Phillips Brooks House Association at Harvard University. In 2020, Moreta was named as one of USA Today's Women of the Century, which recognizes women who have made a "substantial impact on our country or our lives over the past 100 years".

== See also ==
- List of Queens College people
