= FSA debit card =

Debit card tied to flexible spending account

A FSA Debit Card is a type of debit card issued in the United States against a special tax-favoured spending accounts. These include accounts such as flexible spending accounts (FSA), health reimbursement accounts (HRA), and sometimes health savings accounts (HSA).

All such cards to date bear the Visa, MasterCard, or Discover brand and operate through their main networks; thus all FSA debit card transactions are of the offline variety (also known as "signature debit" or, inaccurately but commonly, "credit"). This can create confusion at merchants such as Wal-Mart that attempt to "steer" debit cards to online debit (aka "PIN debit" or just plain "debit"); FSA debit cards will not work that way.

== Background ==
Though these cards can be issued with HRAs and HSAs as well as FSAs, the FSA is the oldest and most common of these accounts; therefore, for simplicity these cards are often referred to as "FSA" debit cards.

Though a few FSA debit cards are also issued for dependent care and transportation expenses, most are issued for medical expenses. (The rest of this article deals only with FSA debit cards used with medical FSAs, HRAs or HSAs.)

Traditionally, to meet Internal Revenue Service (IRS) substantiation requirements, FSAs were accessed only through claims for reimbursement after incurring (and usually paying) an out-of-pocket expense, often after deductions were already made from the employee's paycheck to fund the FSA. This, along with the so-called "use it or lose it" rule (i.e., all funds not spent are forfeited), has long been seen as one of the problems minimizing utilization of FSAs.

The FSA debit card was developed to avoid this problem by allowing users to access their FSA directly without reimbursement, and also (where possible) to provide methods for automating the IRS substantiation requirements which often require substantial paperwork and manpower. Substantiating an FSA debit card transaction without paperwork is known as "auto-adjudication".

HRAs, which were introduced later, not by employee funds; however, they are subject to the same IRS requirements as FSAs, and thus are generally accessed only by paper claims or debit cards just like FSAs.

Unlike FSAs and HRAs, HSAs do not require substantiation prior to withdrawal; users need only retain their receipts with their tax papers. However, since most HSA providers came from FSA and HRA backgrounds, most offer substantiation services for HSAs that are similar to those for FSAs and HRAs. Though many HSA providers offer unrestricted debit cards and even credit cards with their accounts, some voluntarily choose to issue HSA debit cards and impose the same restrictions on their use as those required by the IRS for FSAs and HRAs.

Flexible Spending Accounts (FSAs), commonly referred to as “Section 125” plans or “Cafeteria” plans, were developed as part of Internal Revenue Code Section 125 to provide employees with tax relief for their un-reimbursed medical and dependent day-care costs. FSAs enable employees to utilize pre-tax dollars and save Federal, FICA, and, in most cases, state taxes when paying for eligible expenses not covered by traditional insurance plans.

== Where FSA debit cards may be used ==
Unlike other debit cards, the IRS does not allow FSA debit cards to be used at every merchant that accepts Visa or MasterCard. Rather, only the following types of merchants may accept an FSA debit card, usually enforced using "merchant category codes" or "merchant type codes" assigned by Visa and MasterCard:

- Medical providers such as doctors and hospitals.
- Merchants with an inventory information approval system (IIAS). In an IIAS, a merchant flags "FSA-eligible" items in its point of sale database so they can be separated from all other items by its scanner (brick-and-mortar) or shopping cart (online); it then permits only the "FSA-eligible" items to be charged to the card, with another form of payment required to purchase all other items.
- Until December 31, 2007, all grocers, discounters, and online pharmacies. These merchants must install an IIAS to accept the card after this date.
- Until December 31, 2008, all "true pharmacies" (i.e., those not located inside grocery or discount stores and not online). They must install an IIAS after this date, unless 90% or more of their sales are of FSA-eligible items (prescriptions or over-the-counter items).
- Merchants selling specialized health, mobility, and wellness equipment (such as Class 1 electric bicycles), provided the account holder obtains a Letter of Medical Necessity (LMN) from a medical professional to authorize the eligible expense.

== IRS requirements ==
Under IRS Revenue Ruling 2003-43, every transaction on an FSA debit card must be either substantiated or recouped from the employee. Substantiation can be through either electronic evidence (auto-adjudication) or paper receipts submitted by the user (similar to paper claims). The process of obtaining receipts or recoupment when auto-adjudication is not possible is known as "pay and chase", a term the IRS also used in its most recent ruling (Notice 2007-02).

The most common method of auto-adjudication is known as "copay matching". Under Ruling 2003-43 as amplified by Notice 2006-69, the FSA or HRA provider must obtain from the employee's health plan the standard copayment amounts for that plan. If the charge is exactly equal to between one and five of those copayment amounts, it may be auto-adjudicated and approved without receipts. If the health plan has different copayment amounts for a particular type of charge, any valid combination of copayment amounts may be approved, up to five times the highest possible copayment amount.

Also, charges may be auto-adjudicated if they are accompanied by electronic information substantiating that the charge is for medical purposes. This may be done through such means as including details of the transaction with the charge (Ruling 2003-43) or forwarding the health plan's explanation of benefits to the FSA or HRA provider for further processing (Notice 2006-69).

Under Notice 2006-69, all charges from a merchant with an IIAS may also be auto-adjudicated; however, beginning in 2007 the merchant must make available to the employer the detailed records of all such transactions for IRS review. This may be done either automatically or in response to an IRS audit of the employer.

If the charge is not substantiated by auto-adjudication or receipts, the FSA or HRA provider must recoup the charge and suspend the card until it is recouped. In addition to voluntary methods of recoupment, employers commonly use payroll deduction, as well as offsetting the recoupment against future paper claims. If all else fails, the employer may add the amount of the charge to the employee's W-2 as taxable income.
