= Socially disadvantaged farmers and ranchers =

Agriculturalists who have faced systemic racial, ethnic or gender prejudice

Socially disadvantaged farmers and ranchers in the United States are individuals engaged in agriculture who belong to groups that have historically faced racial or ethnic prejudice, impacting their ability to acquire land, secure financing, and access agricultural programs. The United States Department of Agriculture defines a socially disadvantaged group as one whose members have been subjected to racial or ethnic prejudice without regard to their individual qualities.

In 2021 the definition garnered renewed attention due to the American Rescue Plan.

== Definition ==
Section 2501(e)(2) of the Food, Agriculture, Conservation, and Trade Act of 1990 defines a socially disadvantaged farmer or rancher as a member of a socially disadvantaged group. The United States Department of Agriculture identifies these groups to include, but not be limited to, African Americans, American Indians, Alaskan Natives, Asians, Hispanics, and Pacific Islanders. For the purposes of loan eligibility, section 355(e) of the Con Act adds gender to the definition of a socially disadvantaged group.

== Demographics ==
Data from the 2017 census of agriculture indicates that women, considered socially disadvantaged under certain Department of Agriculture definitions, operated 55.8% of farms and accounted for 29.1% of principal producers.

== Challenges ==
Socially disadvantaged farmers and ranchers often encounter significant obstacles, including limited access to credit, technical assistance, and markets. Historical discrimination has led to a substantial loss in the number of socially disadvantaged producers, reduced the amount of farmland they control, and contributed to a cycle of debt exacerbated during the COVID-19 pandemic.

== United States Department of Agriculture initiatives ==
To address these disparities, the Department of Agriculture has implemented programs aimed at supporting socially disadvantaged farmers and ranchers:

- Outreach and Assistance for Socially Disadvantaged Farmers and Ranchers and Veteran Farmers and Ranchers Program (2501 Program) — Established in 1990, this program provides grants to organizations that assist socially disadvantaged farmers and ranchers in owning and operating farms and in participating in Department of Agriculture programs.
- American Rescue Plan Act of 2021 — This legislation allocated $4 billion for debt relief to socially disadvantaged farmers and an additional $1 billion to improve land access, address heirs’ property issues, and support historically underserved farmers.
