= Health reimbursement account =

US employer-funded health insurance plan

A Health Reimbursement Arrangement (HRA) is a US employer-funded health benefit plan that reimburses employees on a tax-free basis for out-of-pocket medical expenses up to a limit defined by the employer. Individual Coverage Health Reimbursement Arrangements (ICHRAs, also known as CHOICE Arrangements) allow individuals to pay for health insurance premiums.

An HRA is not truly an account, since it does not place funds under a separate legal title. Instead, it is an agreement under which the employee can submit qualified health expenses to the employer for reimbursement.

Following implementation of the Affordable Care Act, HRAs must be integrated with a qualified employer-sponsored group health insurance plan to avoid excise tax penalties. Using a Health Reimbursement Arrangement yields "tax advantages to offset health care costs" for both employees and employers.

== QSEHRA ==
In 2016, qualified small employer HRA (QSEHRA) were created which allows small employers to pay for premiums, including on the individual market such as through a health insurance marketplace, although the employees may not be eligible for subsidies. On average, employers with these plans offered an average $387 per month.

== ICHRA ==
In January 2020, a new type of HRA became available to businesses of all sizes that allows an employer to scale its benefits across nine different classes. This new tax-advantaged tool is called an ICHRA (Individual Coverage HRA) and brings greater flexibility in design, expands upon the benefits that its predecessor, the QSEHRA, offered, and presents a potential solution to the issue of premium tax credits and HRA benefits that QSEHRAs posed.

An ICHRA allows employers to reimburse their employees tax-free for individual insurance premiums and medical expenses. Employers that offer ICHRAs do not create or manage group plans for their employees; instead, they create different classes of employees and set monthly allowances for each. Employees can use their allowance to pay for individual insurance and other medical expenses under Section 213(d) of the Internal Revenue Code.

Employers cannot offer workers a choice between ICHRA benefits and group health insurance. However, an ICHRA deemed affordable for minimum value coverage can allows applicable large employers (ALEs) to meet the PPACA employer mandates.

The HRA Council, a non-partisan advocacy group made up of health insurance leaders, brokers, administrators, and organizations, released its first ICHRA report in October 2022. Using data from BenefitBay, Flyte HCM, HealthSherpa, HRASimple, Nexben, OneBridge Benefits, PeopleKeep, Stride Health, TakeCommand, and zizzl health, the HRA council found ICHRAs saw a 350% growth in popularity from 2020 to 2022.

Subsequent HRA Council reports showed continued growth: by mid-2025, large-employer (50+ full-time-equivalent) ICHRA adoption had grown 34% year-over-year, with some employer cohorts up 49%, and cumulative ICHRA adoption up roughly 1000% since 2020. By August 2026, more than 20,000 U.S. businesses offered ICHRA or QSEHRA as a health benefit, covering over 500,000 employees. According to Zorro's 2026 Broker ICHRA Survey Report, nearly half (47.5%) of brokers now sell ICHRA. Of these, nearly 1 in 4 have scaled to 11+ ICHRA clients.

== Establishment ==
Health Reimbursement Arrangements are funded solely by the employer, though employees may be able to pay for premiums through a salary deduction through a Section 125 Cafeteria Plan. The employer sets the parameters for the Health Reimbursement Arrangement, and unused dollars remain with the employer: they do not follow the employee to new employment.

== Contributions ==
Under an Health Reimbursement Arrangement, funds belong to the employer until the participating employee incurs an expense and requests a reimbursement. Employers may also pay insurance carriers directly for coverage on behalf of their employees. According to the IRS, an HRA "must be funded solely by an employer. Contributions cannot be paid through a salary reduction agreement (such as a cafeteria plan).

While ICHRAs and integrated HRAs have no annual contribution limits, the QSEHRA is capped by the IRS. These limits are updated each year through IRS revenue procedure. For 2023, self-only employees can receive employer contributions of up to $5,850. Employees with families can receive up to $11,800.

== Distributions ==
According to the IRS, employees are reimbursed tax-free for qualified medical expenses up to a maximum amount for a coverage period. HRAs reimburse only items (co-pays, coinsurance, deductibles, and services) agreed to by the employer that are not covered by the employer's selected standard insurance plan (any health insurance plan, not only a High Deductible Health Plan). The arrangements are described in IRC Section 105.

With an HRA, employers fund individual reimbursement accounts for their employees and define what those funds can be used for, specified out-of-pocket expenses such as deductibles and co-pays.

Qualified claims must be described in the HRA plan document at inception: before reimbursing employees for the medical expenses. Arrangements (medical services, dental services, co-pays, coinsurance, deductibles, participation) may vary from plan to plan, and an employer may have multiple plans in place, allowing much flexibility. The kinds of expenses that can be paid under an HRA are generally the same as the expenses that can be paid through a Flexible Spending Account (FSA).

The employer is not required to prepay into a fund for reimbursements. Instead, the employer reimburses employee claims as they occur.

Reimbursements under an HRA can be made to the following persons:

1. Current and former employees.
2. Spouses and dependents of those employees.
3. Any person the employee could have claimed as a dependent on the employee's return unless:
  1. The person filed a joint return,
  2. The person had gross income of $3,400 or more, or
  3. The employee or spouse, if filing jointly, could be claimed as a dependent on someone else's tax return.
4. Spouses and dependents of deceased employees.

== Advantages ==
Advantages of HRAs for employers include:

- Reimbursements of qualified claims are tax-deductible for the employer.
- Employers know their maximum expense related to their health care benefit.

Advantages of HRAs for employees include:

- Contributions that employers make can be excluded from employees' gross income (contributions must be made by the employer, not come from payroll reductions).
- Reimbursements may be tax free if the employee pays qualified medical expenses.
- Unused funds in the HRA can be rolled into future years for reimbursement.
- HRAs may be offered in conjunction with other employer-provided health benefits, including Flexible Spending Accounts (FSAs).
- Employees can be reimbursed for a health care plan that meets their or their families' specific needs, as opposed to a standard company plan.

== Disadvantages ==
A frequent complaint regarding HRA arrangements is that they are extremely opaque in regards to their requirements. HRAs must follow "a variety of statutory rules and provisions" including the COBRA continuation coverage requirements, ERISA, and HIPAA.

HRA plans are considered "Primary Payers" subject to Medicare Secondary Payer (MSP) mandatory reporting requirements. There are significant penalties for failure to comply with the MSP reporting requirements. Although the MSP reporting requirements began to apply to certain group health plans on January 1, 2009, CMS has delayed mandatory reporting for HRAs.

Rules pertaining to their reimbursements are perceived by member participants to be somewhat contradictory and/or even incoherent, leading some to lose contributions intended for healthcare but later (after the procedure or laboratory test) to be disallowed.

Other disadvantages of HRAs include:

- Self-employed persons are usually ineligible, as are S-corp owners.
- "Highly compensated" participants may be subject to "certain limitations."

A sole proprietor can employ a spouse who actually helps the business. The employer would need to establish a W-2 to make the spouse's employment legitimate. The health care can be run through the business and save the family, on average, $3,000 each year. Small businesses looking to reduce costs, especially medical costs, can use the HRA.

HRAs are treated as group health plans and subject to the Medicare secondary payment (MSP). HRAs are subject to the provisions regardless of whether or not they have an end-of-year carry-over feature.

Standalone HRAs not offered in conjunction with a High Deductible Health Plan are subjected to restrictions starting in 2014. The law now essentially bans the existence of most such HRAs, as a health plan with maximum benefit limit.
