= Cafeteria plan =

Type of employee benefit plan in the US

A cafeteria plan or cafeteria system is a type of employee benefit plan offered in the United States pursuant to Section 125 of the Internal Revenue Code. Its name comes from the earliest versions of such plans, which allowed employees to choose between different types of benefits, similar to the ability of a customer to choose among available items in a cafeteria. Qualified cafeteria plans are excluded from gross income. To qualify, a cafeteria plan must allow employees to choose from two or more benefits consisting of cash or qualified benefit plans. The Internal Revenue Code explicitly excludes deferred compensation plans from qualifying as a cafeteria plan subject to a gross income exemption. Section 125 also provides two exceptions.

If the cafeteria plan discriminates in favor of highly compensated employees, the highly compensated employees will be required to report their cafeteria plan benefits as income. The second exception is that if "the statutory nontaxable benefits provided to key employees exceed 25 percent of the aggregate of such benefits provided for all employees under the plan," then the key employees must report their cafeteria plan benefits as income. Effective January 1, 2011, eligible employers meeting contribution requirements and eligibility and participation requirements can establish a "simple" cafeteria plan. Simple cafeteria plans are treated as meeting the nondiscrimination requirements of a cafeteria plan and certain benefits under a cafeteria plan.

== History ==
The Cafeteria Benefits Plan resulted from Thomas Ellsworth Wood of Hewitt Associates and chairman of the Corporate Board for the International Foundation of Employee Benefit Plans. Wood, who once said, "One universal benefit program can no longer do the job," was the originator of flexible compensation due to the fact that American corporations and households were becoming increasingly dynamic and globalized. As quoted in his chapter of the business publication Business, Work, and Benefits: Adjusting to Change, produced by the Employee Benefit Research Institute, "Wood's framework creates a specific detailed picture. The concepts include the establishment of a basic "safety net" of benefits to cover financial hazards associated with old age, death and disability, and catastrophic medical expenses, with supplementary benefits offered on a defined contribution basis".

Cafeteria plans were added to the Internal Revenue Code in November 1978. Internal Revenue Code Section 125 sets forth the requirements and tax treatment of cafeteria plans. Section 125 has been amended multiple times since its enactment.

In May 2005, the Treasury Department and the Internal Revenue Service announced that, effective immediately, employers would be permitted to design cafeteria plans that enable participants to be reimbursed for claims incurred up to 2½ months after the close of a plan year. Before this notice, reimbursements were permitted only for claims incurred during the plan year. Under the new ruling, an employee who participates in a Flexible Spending Account plan ending December 31 can still receive reimbursement for claims incurred through March 15 if the extended grace period is adopted by the employer.

Since the "use it or lose it" fear of many employees was reduced significantly by the expanded claims reimbursement cycle, and access to funds can now be better targeted for purchases that the employee actually needs, there has been a clear increase in both the percentage of employees opting to participate in a Flex Plan and in the level of annual elections, enhancing FICA savings for employees and employers alike.

== Features and benefits ==
Employees of employers with cafeteria plans may obtain such benefits as health insurance, group-term life insurance, voluntary "supplemental" insurance (dental, vision, cancer, hospital confinement, accident, etc.), and flexible spending accounts through the plan. Though some cafeteria plans offer an explicit choice of cash or benefits, most today are operated through a "salary redirection agreement", which is a payroll deduction in all but name. Deductions under such agreements are often called pre-tax deductions. Salary redirection contributions are not actually or constructively received by the participant. Therefore, those contributions are not generally considered wages for federal income tax purposes, nor are they usually subject to Federal Insurance Contributions Act tax (FICA) and Federal Unemployment Tax Act (FUTA).

Reasons for implementing a Section 125 plan are primarily for the tax savings advantages for the employer and employee. Both parties save on taxes and therefore increase their spendable income. Employees' pretax contributions are not subject to federal, state, or social security taxes. Employers save on the employer portion of FICA, FUTA, and workers' compensation insurance premiums.

A cafeteria plan may permit an employee to revoke an election during a period of coverage and to make a new election only in limited circumstances, such as a change in status event. A change in status event includes changes in the number of an employee's dependents.

=== Medical expenses eligible for reimbursement under a Section 125 cafeteria plan ===
The following is a list of common non-prescription over-the-counter items eligible for reimbursement, dual purpose items that may be reimbursable with a physician's statement and items that are not reimbursable. This list is not all-inclusive.

- Acupuncture
- Adoption related medical costs
- Air conditioner filters for allergy relief
- Alcoholism treatment
- Ambulance services
- Attendant for blind or deaf student
- Autoette
- Birth control pills
- Blind persons accessories (seeing-eye dog, Braille training, special schooling)
- Capital expenditures (home modifications for handicapped)
- Car modifications for handicapped
- Childbirth prep classes (mother only)
- Chiropractors
- Christian Science treatment
- Contact lenses (including replacement insurance)
- Cosmetic Surgery (non-elective only)
- Crutches
- Deaf persons' accessories (hearing aids, special schooling)
- Dental fees
- Dentures
- Diagnostic fees
- Doctors' fees
- Domestic aid (in-home nurse)
- Drug addiction treatment
- Dyslexia language training
- Electrolysis (medical reasons only)
- Elevator for cardiac conditions
- Eye exams and glasses
- Fertility enhancement
- Fluoride device
- Guide animals
- Hair transplant (surgical and medical reasons)
- Hearing aids
- HMO's
- Hospital care (in-patient)
- Indian medicine man
- Insulin
- Insurance premiums (medical post-tax only) (Note: Health insurance provided through an employee's spouse's group health plan is allowable only if the spouse paid for all or part of the coverage on an after-tax basis.)
- Iron lung
- Lab fees
- Laetrile (legal use)
- Laser eye surgery
- Lead paint removal
- Learning disability (doctor-recommended special schooling fees)
- Legal expenses related to medical condition
- Lifetime medical care prepaid-retirement home
- Limbs (artificial)
- Lodging (for medical care away from home)
- Long Term Care Services (qualified medical only)
- Meals (medical care away from home)
- Medical conferences (relating to illness)
- Nursing home (medical reasons)
- Nursing services (home care)
- Operation (legal, including abortion)
- Organ donor
- Orthodontia
- Orthopedic shoes
- Osteopaths
- Oxygen equipment
- Prescription drugs (Note: Pursuant to Revenue Ruling 2003-102, over-the-counter drugs that are used to alleviate or treat personal injuries or sickness are now reimbursable through health care flexible spending accounts.)
- Psychiatric care
- Psychotherapists
- Sexual dysfunction treatment
- Sterilization
- Stop-smoking programs and prescription drugs
- Swimming pool (for polio or arthritis treatment)
- Telephone equipment (for hearing impaired)
- Television close caption prescribed by doctor
- Vasectomy
- Weight loss programs (doctor prescribed for medical reasons)
- Wheelchair
- Wigs (alleviation of physical or mental discomfort)
- X-rays

=== Over-the-counter expenses eligible for reimbursement under a Section 125 cafeteria plan ===
==== Eligible expenses ====
The following is a list of over-the-counter items the IRS has determined to be primarily for medical care and eligible for reimbursement.

- Allergy medicine
- Antacids
- Anti-diarrhea medicine
- Bactine
- Band-aids, bandages
- Bug-bite medication
- Calamine lotion
- Carpal-tunnel wrist supports
- Cold medicines
- Cold packs and hot packs for injuries
- Condoms
- Contact lens cleaning solution
- Cough drops
- Diaper rash ointments
- First aid cream
- First aid kits
- Hemorrhoid medication
- Incontinence supplies
- Laxatives
- Liquid adhesive for small cuts
- Menstrual cycle products for pain and/or cramps
- Motion sickness pills
- Muscle or joint pain products
- Nasal sinus sprays, nasal strips
- Nicotine gum/patches for stop-smoking
- Pain relievers
- Pedialyte for hydration of an ill child
- Pregnancy test kits
- Reading glasses
- Rubbing alcohol
- Sinus medications
- Sleeping aids to treat insomnia
- Spermicidal foam
- Sunburn ointments or creams
- Thermometers (ear or mouth)
- Throat lozenges
- Visine and other eye products
- Wart remover treatments

==== Dual-purpose items ====
The following list of dual-purpose over-the-counter items can be reimbursed if used for medical purposes. Some of these items require a medical practitioner's note stating the item is to treat a specific medical condition.

- Acne treatment for medical condition such as acne vulgaris
- Dietary supplements or herbal medicines to treat medical conditions in specific circumstances
- Fiber supplements under narrow circumstances
- Glucosamine/chondrotin for arthritis
- Orthopedic shoes and inserts
- Hormone therapy and treatment for menopause symptoms such as hot flashes and night sweats
- Pills for lactose intolerance
- Prenatal vitamins
- St. John's Wort for depression
- Sunscreen
- Weight-loss drugs to treat a specific disease including obesity

== See also ==
- Taxation in the United States
- Payroll taxes in the United States
- Corporate tax in the United States
- Internal Revenue Service
- Freelance marketplace
