= Consolidated Omnibus Budget Reconciliation Act of 1985 =

U.S. Law

- Long title: An Act to provide for reconciliation pursuant to section 2 of the first current resolution on the budget for fiscal year 1986
- Acronyms (colloquial): COBRA
- Announced in: the 99th United States Congress

Citations
- Public law: 99-272
- Statutes at Large: 100 Stat. 82

Codification
- Acts affected: Employee Retirement Income Security Act of 1974

Legislative history
- Introduced in the House as H.R. 3128 by Daniel Rostenkowski (D–IL) on July 31, 1985; Committee consideration by House Committee on Ways and Means, United States House Committee on Education and Labor, United States House Committee on Energy and Commerce, House Committee on the Judiciary, Senate Committee on Finance; Passed the House on October 31, 1985 (238-183 with amendment); Passed the Senate on November 14, 1985 (93-6); Reported by the joint conference committee on December 19, 1985; agreed to by the Senate on December 19, 1985 (78-1) and by the House on March 20, 1986 (230-154); Signed into law by President Ronald Reagan on April 7, 1986

The Consolidated Omnibus Budget Reconciliation Act of 1985 (COBRA) is a law passed by the U.S. Congress on a reconciliation basis and signed by President Ronald Reagan that, among other things, mandates an insurance program which gives some employees the ability to continue health insurance coverage after leaving employment. COBRA includes amendments to the Employee Retirement Income Security Act of 1974 (ERISA). The law deals with a great variety of subjects, such as tobacco price supports, railroads, private pension plans, emergency department treatment, disability insurance, and the postal service, but it is perhaps best known for Title X, which amends the Internal Revenue Code and the Public Health Service Act to deny income tax deductions to employers (generally those with 20 or more full-time equivalent employees) for contributions to a group health plan unless such plan meets certain continuing coverage requirements. The violation for failing to meet those criteria was subsequently changed to an excise tax.

Although this statute became law on April 7, 1986, its official name is the Consolidated Omnibus Budget Reconciliation Act of 1985 (Pub. L. 99–272, 100 Stat. 82). Because of the discrepancy between the official name of the Act and the year in which it was enacted, some government publications refer to the Act as the Consolidated Omnibus Budget Reconciliation Act of 1986.

== Provisions ==
As originally enacted, Title X of the Act provided that a qualifying employer will not be permitted to take a tax deduction for its health insurance costs unless its health insurance plan allows employees of the employer and the employee's immediate family members who had been covered by a health care plan to maintain their coverage if a "qualifying event" causes them to lose coverage. However, the legislation was subsequently amended to instead impose an excise tax upon an employer whose health plan fails to satisfy the applicable rules. A qualifying employer is generally an employer with 20 or more full-time-equivalent employees. (Note: ERISA cites "(more) than 20 employees on a typical business day during the preceding calendar year". All employees must be counted, even employees who have voluntarily waived group health coverage or who are not eligible for group health coverage due to part-time status. Employees who work less than full-time must be counted as a fraction of a full-time employee based on the employees' work hours.)

Among the "qualifying events" listed in the statute are loss of benefits coverage due to (1) the death of the covered employee; (2) an employee loses eligibility for coverage due to voluntary or involuntary termination or a reduction in hours as a result of resignation, discharge (except for "gross misconduct"), layoff, strike or lockout, medical leave, or slowdown in business operations; (3) divorce or legal separation that terminates the ex-spouse's eligibility for benefits; or (4) a dependent child reaching the age at which he or she is no longer covered. (Note: Qualified beneficiaries must notify the plan administrator of a divorce, legal separation, or a dependent child ceasing to be a dependent under the terms of the plan within 60 days of the later of either the date of the event or the date coverage would be lost as a result of the event.) COBRA imposes different notice requirements on participants and beneficiaries, depending on the particular qualifying event that triggers COBRA rights. (Note: The first day of leave under the Family Medical Leave Act of 1993 (FMLA) is not a qualifying event for COBRA purposes. The qualifying event for COBRA occurs if and when it becomes known that the employee will not be returning from the leave.) See DOL.GOV's FAQs For Employers About COBRA Continuation Health Coverage

COBRA does not apply if coverage is lost because the employer has terminated the plan altogether or because the employer has gone out of business.

COBRA allows for coverage for up to 18 months in most cases. If the individual is deemed disabled by the Social Security Administration, coverage may continue for up to 29 months. (Note: COBRA coverage must be allowed 29 months of COBRA coverage if the qualifying beneficiary is deemed by the Social Security Administration, under Title II or Title XVI, to have been disabled before the end of the first 60 days of COBRA continuation coverage. In order for these rights to apply, the employer needs to be informed of the Social Security Administration's disability determination before the 18-month period has elapsed and within 60 days of the date it is received by the disabled qualified beneficiary. If one member of a family qualifies for the 29-month period, then the entire family qualifies for the 29-month period.) In the case of divorce from the former employee, the former spouse's coverage may continue for up to 36 months. In the case of death of the former employee, the widow's coverage may continue for up to 36 months. (Note: Another extended coverage period involves Medicare eligibility. If an end of employment occurs less than 18 months after the employee's Medicare entitlement, qualified beneficiaries other than the covered employee must be allowed 36 months of COBRA coverage from the date of the Medicare entitlement. Qualified beneficiaries then have 36 months from the date of Medicare entitlement or 18 months from the end of employment, whichever is longer. A covered employee must be allowed 18 months of COBRA coverage from the end of employment.)

COBRA does not apply to businesses with fewer than twenty employees, but the majority of states have stepped in with state health insurance continuation laws, sometimes called "mini-COBRA" laws, which apply in these cases. Some of these are described below.

COBRA does not, unlike other federal statutes such as the Family and Medical Leave Act (FMLA), require the employer to pay for the cost of providing continuation coverage. Instead it allows employees and their dependents to maintain coverage at their own expense by paying the full cost of the premium the employer and the employee previously paid, plus up to a 2% administrative charge (50% for the latter 11 months under the disability extension).

According to the U.S. Department of Labor:

...the coverage you are given must be identical to the coverage that is currently available under the plan to similarly situated active employees and their families (generally, this is the same coverage that you had immediately before the qualifying event). You will also be entitled, while receiving continuation coverage, to the same benefits, choices, and services that a similarly situated participant or beneficiary is currently receiving under the plan, such as the right during an open enrollment season to choose among available coverage options. You will also be subject to the same rules and limits that would apply to a similarly situated participant or beneficiary, such as co-payment requirements, deductibles, and coverage limits.

Employees and dependents can also opt for a lesser form of coverage, e.g., to choose continuation coverage under a plan that only covers the employee, but not his or her dependents, or that only provides medical and hospitalization coverage and does not pay for dental work, if those options are available to covered employees.

Employees and dependents lose coverage if they fail to make timely payments of these premiums. Employers are required to inform employees and dependents upon loss of coverage, in writing, by at least fifteen days before the coverage ceases.

=== Equal Access to COBRA Act ===
The Equal Access to COBRA Act (S. 3182) was a bill which would have amended the Internal Revenue Code, the Employee Retirement Income Security Act of 1974, and the Public Health Service Act to extend COBRA health insurance coverage to qualified beneficiaries, defined to include domestic partners. The bill was introduced on March 25, 2010, by Senator Barbara Boxer. It was later reintroduced by Representative Anthony Weiner on March 10, 2011. Upon being introduced, the bill was read twice and sent to the Senate Committee on Health, Education, Labor, and Pensions. The bill never left committee.

== Coordination of coverage ==
An individual covered under COBRA may also be covered by another group health plan or Medicare as long as either of two conditions is met:

- The other coverage was in force as of or prior to the coverage under COBRA.
- The other coverage is subject to pre-existing conditions exclusions or limitations.

Under COBRA, the following individuals may be eligible for continuation coverage:

1. Employees: Full-time and part-time employees who were covered by a group health plan sponsored by an employer with 20 or more employees.
2. Spouses: Spouses of covered employees who were enrolled in the group health plan.
3. Dependent children: Dependent children of covered employees who were enrolled in the group health plan.
4. Qualified beneficiaries: Individuals who were covered under the group health plan but lost coverage due to a qualifying event, such as the death of the covered employee, divorce or legal separation, a reduction in work hours, or the employee's eligibility for Medicare.

COBRA coverage is typically temporary and individuals may be required to pay the full premium for the coverage, including the portion previously paid by the employer. The duration of COBRA coverage can vary depending on the specific qualifying event and the state in which the individual resides. Employers that provide COBRA qualified insurance are required to provide information about rights and coverage options to individuals eligible for coverage under the plan.

== Subsidy under federal stimulus ==
Only 10% of Americans eligible for COBRA insurance in 2006 used it, many because they were unable to afford to pay the full premium after their job loss. While some employers may voluntarily help subsidize or fully cover the cost of COBRA insurance as part of a termination or exit package, it is more common for the ex-employee to cover the entire cost.

The American Recovery and Reinvestment Act of 2009 as signed by President Barack Obama includes a 65% subsidy to employees for COBRA-enabled insurance for up to 9 months after an involuntary termination (this has since been expanded to 15 months). An employee is eligible for this subsidy if

- the termination of employment was involuntary,
- the terminated employee has no other group sponsored health insurance option, and
- the terminated employee is otherwise eligible to enroll in COBRA.

If the employee has an adjusted gross income in 2009 over $125,000 if filing as single ($250,000 if filing jointly), then the subsidy will be recaptured in a phased manner from the employee through the tax system.

Termination of employment must have occurred between September 1, 2008 and December 31, 2009 (later expanded to February 28, 2010, expanded again to March 31, 2010, and then expanded again to June 2, 2010). Specific provisions and responsibilities may differ in the state specific mini-COBRA plans for employers with fewer than 20 employees throughout half of the previous calendar year. Those employees who are eligible for the ultimate benefits of this subsidy are referred to as Assistance Eligible Individuals (or AEIs).

Employers subject to Federal COBRA are required to:

- Notify terminated employees of their potential rights under ARRA by sending a series of notices
- Provide a method for qualified AEIs to enroll
- Pay the full amount of the premiums and seek reimbursement of the 65% subsidy by including it in the Employer's Quarterly Federal Tax Return (Form 941)

This Act was signed into law by President Barack Obama on February 17, 2009.

On December 19, 2009, President Obama signed into law the Department of Defense Appropriations Act, 2010, which made several amendments to the COBRA provisions of the American Recovery and Reinvestment Act of 2009 (ARRA). The Act extends COBRA subsidy eligibility to employees who lost their jobs due to no fault of their own between January 1 and February 28, 2010. The nine-month subsidy period was also expanded to fifteen months.

On March 3, 2010, President Obama signed into law the Temporary Extension Act of 2010. The Act extends COBRA subsidy eligibility to employees who lost their jobs due to no fault of their own between March 1 and 31, 2010. In addition, employees who lost group health insurance due to reduced work hours on or after Sept. 1, 2008, followed by involuntary termination between March 2 and March 31, 2010, will now be eligible for the COBRA subsidy.

The Continuing Extension Act of 2010 extends premium assistance for COBRA benefits through May 31, 2010.

As of June 2010, an extension of COBRA's premium assistance has not materialized, and attempts by congressional members to include such provisions have been dropped. As of June 1, 2010, all newly unemployed workers must pay full coverage costs as determined by their respective plans. This is due in part to conservative Democrats in Congress who have expressed concerns about treating some unemployed workers differently from others, such as people priced out of the private insurance market. A number of Senate Democrats expressed concern about this situation and have introduced legislation to expand COBRA coverage to people who become unemployed through November 2010.

The American Rescue Plan Act of 2021 included a provision to fully cover COBRA premiums from April through September 2021.

== Similar state and local legislation ==
Forty-one states have legislation similar to federal COBRA requiring employers to allow employees and their dependents to continue their group health insurance coverage following certain qualifying events. The District of Columbia also has laws covering COBRA.

=== California ===
California's legislation applies to non-government employers with a group health insurance plan with fewer than twenty employees.

=== District of Columbia ===
The District of Columbia's Continuation of Health Coverage Act of 2001 applies to employers with a group health insurance plan with a situs in the District of Columbia and with fewer than twenty employees. Coverage must be offered to be extended for a period of three months following the date that coverage would have ended.

=== Maryland ===
Maryland's legislation only applies to employers with a group health insurance plan with a situs in Maryland and with fewer than twenty employees that continuation coverage must be offered to an employee who lives in Maryland, who had coverage from the employer for at least three months, and who either resigns or loses employment due to no fault of their own. Continuation coverage must also be offered to the former spouse and dependent children of an employee after a divorce. One exception to the eighteen-month rule is that coverage may end for the former spouse upon the former spouse's remarriage. Continuation coverage must also be offered to the surviving spouse and dependent children of an employee who dies. The employee must have resided in Maryland and had coverage with the employer for at least three months prior to death. In all cases, continuation coverage must be offered for eighteen months, with the exception that a former spouse's continuation coverage ends upon remarriage.

=== Virginia ===
Virginia's legislation applies to employers with a group health insurance plan, other than an HMO plan, and with twenty or fewer employees. Employers must offer continuation coverage to employees for twelve months. The legislation does not apply to employees who did not have coverage from the employer for at least three months prior to the qualifying event.

== See also ==
- Health Insurance Portability and Accountability Act of 1996 (HIPAA)
