= Restaurant Revitalization Fund =

The Restaurant Revitalization Fund is a $28.6 billion fund administered by the U.S. Small Business Administration that will provide relief to businesses hurt by the COVID-19 pandemic.
