= Flexible spending account =

Tax-advantaged financial accounts in the US

In the United States, a flexible spending account (FSA), also known as a flexible spending arrangement, is a type of tax-advantaged financial account for medical and dependent care expenses. First established in 1978, remaining FSA funds in excess of a specified amount that are not used by the end of the plan year are forfeited to the employer, known as the "use it or lose it" rule. Before the 2010 Affordable Care Act, no funds could be carried over at all, while as of 2025, a plan may permit an employee to carry over up to $660 into the following year without losing the funds, but this does not apply to all plans, and some plans may have lower limits.

The most common type of flexible spending account, the medical expense FSA (also medical FSA or health FSA), is similar to a health savings account (HSA) or a health reimbursement account (HRA). However, while HSAs and HRAs are almost exclusively used as components of a consumer-driven health care plan, medical FSAs are commonly offered with more traditional health plans as well. Paper forms or an FSA debit card may be used to access the account funds.

== Types ==
Most cafeteria plans offer flexible spending accounts focused on medical and dependent care expenses, although some plans may offer accounts for other qualified expenses such as adoption assistance.

=== Health FSA ===
The most common type of FSA is used to pay for medical and dental expenses not paid for by insurance, usually deductibles, copayments, and coinsurance for the employee's health plan. As of January 1, 2011, over-the-counter medications are allowed only when purchased with a doctor's prescription, except for insulin. Over-the-counter medical devices, such as bandages, crutches, and eyeglass repair kits, are allowable. Generally, allowable items are the same as those allowable for the medical tax deduction, as outlined in IRS publication 502.

Prior to the enactment of the Patient Protection and Affordable Care Act, the Internal Revenue Service permitted employers to enact any maximum annual election for their employees. Patient Protection and Affordable Care Act amended Section 125 such that FSAs may not allow employees to choose an annual election in excess of a limit determined by the Internal Revenue Service. The annual limit was $2,500 for the first plan year beginning after December 31, 2012. The Internal Revenue Service will index subsequent plan years' limits for cost-of-living adjustments. For 2018, this adjustment increases the contribution limit to $2650. Employers have the option to limit their employees' annual elections further. This change starts in plan years that begin after December 31, 2012. The limit is applied to each employee, without regard to whether the employee has a spouse or children. Non-elective contributions made by the employer that are not deducted from the employee's wages are not counted against the limit. An employee employed by multiple unrelated employers may elect an amount up to the limit under each employer's plan. The limit does not apply to health savings accounts, health reimbursement arrangements, or the employee's share of the cost of employer-sponsored health insurance coverage.

Some employers choose to issue a debit card to their employees who participate in the FSA. Participants may use the debit card to pay for their FSA-eligible expenses at the point of sale. Pharmacies and grocery stores who choose to accept the debit card as payment must disallow transactions at point of sale if the participant attempts to pay for items that are not eligible under an FSA. In addition, employers still must require employees to provide itemized receipts for all expenses charged to the debit card. The IRS allows employers to waive this requirement when an individual uses the debit card at a pharmacy or grocery store that complies with the above procedure. The IRS also allows employers to waive this requirement when the amount charged to the debit card is a multiple of a co-pay of the employee's group health insurance plan. In most cases, the FSA administering firm will prefer actual insurance Explanations of Benefits (EOBs) clearly representing the patient portion of any medical expense, over other, more vague documentation. This requirement is becoming less cumbersome as more insurances allow patients to search for past EOBs on their websites.

=== Dependent care FSA ===
FSAs can also be established to pay for certain expenses to care for certain dependents while their caretaker is at work.

Child care for children under the age of 13 while the guardian is at work is generally allowable under a dependent care FSA. The FSA can be used to pay for day camp for an eligible individual but not overnight camps.

Day care while a caretaker is at work is also generally allowable in the case of a spouse or dependent, regardless of age, who is physically or mentally incapable of caring for themselves, is a tax dependent, and lives with the caretaker for more than six months of the year.

Day care generally includes daycare centers outside the home and household employees who care for a qualifying dependent. Transportation to and from daycare provided by the care provider is often allowable with a letter of necessity.

Federal law limits the dependent care FSA to $5,000 per year per household (or $2,500 if married filing separately). The annual limit increases to $7,500 per year (or $3,750 if married filing separately) as of January 1, 2026, in accordance with the OBBBA. Married spouses may each make contributions to a dependent care FSA, but their total combined annual election cannot exceed the annual limit.

Unlike medical FSAs, dependent care FSAs are not "pre-funded"; employees cannot receive reimbursement for the full amount of the annual contribution on day one. Employees can only be reimbursed up to the amount of their wages they have contributed to the dependent care FSA that far during that plan year.

If married, both spouses must earn income in order for either of them to be eligible for a dependent care FSA. The only exceptions are if the non-earning spouse is disabled or a full-time student. If one spouse earns less than the annual limit, then the benefit is limited to whatever that spouse earned.

=== Other FSAs ===
There are FSA plans for non-employer sponsored premium reimbursement and parking and transit expense reimbursement. The individual premium account allows an employee to pay for his or her spouse's insurance with pre-tax dollars as long as the other coverage is a non-employer-sponsored, is considered an individual plan, and is directly billed to the member or the member's spouse. A parking and transit account allows employees to pay parking or public transit expenses with pre-tax dollars up to certain limits. Though not as common as the FSAs listed above, some employers have offered adoption assistance through an FSA. Also, one cannot have a health care FSA if he or she has a High Deductible Health Plan (HDHP) with a Health Savings Account (HSA). In cases where an employee has a HDHP with a HSA, they are eligible for a Limited Expense FSA (LEX) (also called Limited Purpose FSA). These FSAs may be used to reimburse dental and vision expenses, regardless of any plan deductible; at the employer's discretion, eligible medical expenses incurred after the deductible is met may also be reimbursable.

== Coverage period ==
An FSA's coverage period ends either at the time the plan year ends for one's plan or at the time when one's coverage under that plan ends. An example of such an event is the loss of coverage due to a separation from the employer.

This means that if, for example, a person is employed by a company from January through June and covered on their cafeteria benefits plan (including FSA) during that time, but does not elect and pay for continued coverage under that plan (i.e., COBRA), the person's coverage period is defined only as January through June, not January through December as one might think. In this example, all covered expenses must be incurred between January and June of that year.

=== Plan year grace period ===
In 2005, the Internal Revenue Service authorized an optional grace period of up to 2½ months that employers can use in their plans, allowing use of the funds for up to 2½ months after the end of the plan year.

In 2020, the Consolidated Appropriations Act, 2021 contained provisions to allow employees to roll over the remainder of their accounts from 2020 into 2021 and from 2021 into 2022.

== Methods of withdrawal ==
The FSA debit card was developed to eliminate "double-dipping", by allowing employees to access the FSA directly. It also simplified the substantiation requirement, which required labor-intensive claims processing. The debit card also enhances the effect of "pre-funding" medical FSAs. However, the substantiation requirement itself did not go away, and has even been expanded on by the IRS for the debit-card environment; therefore, withdrawal issues still remain for FSAs. These withdrawal issues have led to creative solutions by ecommerce companies who created an entire website dedicated to FSA-eligible items and accepting all FSA debit cards, and other websites which created a small portion of their website dedicated to FSAs.

According to Celent, as of May 2006, there were approximately 6 million debit cards in the market tied to FSA accounts, representing 25% of the FSA participating community. Celent projects that FSA cards will increase FSA adoption rates. The average card participation rate was around 20% as of May 2006. By 2010, it is projected this rate will increase to 85%.

== Advantages and disadvantages ==
=== Pre-funding and risks incurred by the employee and employer ===
One consideration regarding medical FSAs is that the participating employee's entire annual contribution is available at the start of the plan year, commonly January 1, or after the first contribution to the FSA is received by the FSA vendor, depending on the plan. Therefore, if the employee experiences a qualifying event during the first period, the entire amount of the annual contribution can be claimed against the FSA benefits. If the employee is terminated, quits, or is unable to return to work, he or she does not have to repay the money to the employer.

The employee contributes to the FSA in small increments throughout the year (for example, 1/26 of the annual amount if one is paid every two weeks), but taken together, all employees of a company contribute the full average amount during any given period, and no real risk is incurred by the employer. In addition, instead of paying payroll taxes to the government, the employer typically pays only a small administrative fee to the plan of $4–10 per month per participating employee. This is much less than the employer would have paid for its share of payroll taxes. In addition, any money that is not used by the end of the plan year (or grace period) is returned to the employer. This is estimated to be up to 14% of the total employee contributions, which can be a substantial boon to the employer's bottom line.

If a company plans to lay off some employees, and announces such plans, then if multiple employees use their entire flexible benefit before they are terminated, that may cause the company to have to reimburse the plan. Typically, however, employers do not announce layoffs for specific employees with enough notice for employees to use the available benefits, and employees may actually lose their contributions in addition to being laid off.

An employee does not continue to contribute to the plan upon termination of employment. Thus, one could use the entire amount on day one of the plan year, terminate employment on day two of the plan year, and contributions would have been none or negligible (e.g., perhaps 1/26 in the case of biweekly contributions). The "free" money is not taxable because the IRS views these plans as health insurance plans for tax purposes. According to IRS section 125, benefits received from a health insurance plan are not considered taxable income.

The same reasons that make pre-funding a possible benefit to an employee participating in a plan make them a potential risk to employers setting up a plan. The employer has to make up the difference that the employee has spent from the flexible spending account but not yet contributed if other employees' contributions do not account for the money spent. The amount the employer loses due to pre-funding may eventually be partially, totally, or more than made up by employees that do not spend all of the money in their FSA account by the end of the plan year and grace period (see above).

=== Over-the-counter drugs and medical items ===
Another FSA feature that was introduced in 2003, is the ability to pay for over-the-counter (OTC) drugs and medical items. In addition to substantially expanding the range of "FSA-eligible" purchases, adding OTC items made it easier to "spend down" medical FSAs at year-end to avoid the "use it or lose it" rule.

However, substantiation has again become an issue; generally, OTC purchases require either manual claims or, for FSA debit cards, submission of receipts after the fact. Most FSA providers require that receipts show the complete name of the item; the abbreviations on many store receipts are incomprehensible to many claims offices. Also, some of the IRS rules on what is and isn't eligible have proven rather arcane in practice. The recently developed inventory information approval system (IIAS), separates eligible and ineligible items at the point-of-sale and provides for automatic debit-card substantiation.

Effective January 1, 2020, over-the-counter medicines are allowable without a prescription or a note from a physician. In addition, menstrual care products are also allowable. The change was made as part of the Coronavirus Aid, Relief, and Economic Security Act (CARES Act).

=== Eligible Medical Item List ===
The IIAS system references a master eligibility list of FSA eligible products at the point of sale. The Special Interest Group for IIAS Standards (SIG-IS) maintains this eligibility list and updates it on a monthly basis.

The FSA Eligibility List includes items within eligible healthcare product categories determined by the IRS. Health Savings Accounts share the same medical item eligibility list as FSAs.

According to section 9003(c) of the Patient Protection and Affordable Care Act, as of January 1, 2011, drugs needed to be prescribed to be reimbursable. That requirement was lifted, effective January 1, 2020.

=== Use it or lose it ===
A potential drawback is that the money must be spent "within the coverage period" as defined by the benefits cafeteria plan coverage definition. This coverage period is usually defined as the "period that you are covered" under the cafeteria plan during the "plan year." The "plan year" is commonly defined as the calendar year, but could also include the grace period of Jan 1 – March 15 of the following year. For example, the "plan year" (or "benefit year") of 2016 would run from Jan 1, 2016, until March 15, 2017, if the employer offered the grace period.

Any money left unspent at the end of the coverage period is forfeited and can be applied to future plan administrative costs or can be equally allocated as taxable income among all plan participants; this is commonly known as the "use it or lose it" rule. Under most plans, the "coverage period" generally ceases upon termination of employment whether initiated by the employee or the employer, unless the employee continues coverage with the company under COBRA or other arrangement. Should an employee have unused contributions in an FSA and no additional qualifying claims during the coverage period the employee it is possible that the employee will forfeit (lose) the funds. If the payroll taxes saved on the employee's contributions exceeds the amount the employee forfeited, may nonetheless have saved money.

A second requirement is that all applications for refunds must be made by a date defined by the plan. If funds are forfeited, this does not eliminate the requirement to pay taxes on these funds if such taxes are required. For example, if a single person elects to withhold $5,000 for child care expenses and marries a non-working spouse, the $5,000 would become taxable. If this person did not submit claims by the required date, the $5,000 would be forfeited but taxes would still be owed on the amount.

Also, the annual contribution amount must remain the same throughout the year unless certain qualifying events occur, such as the birth of a child or death of a spouse.

Effective 2013 plan years, employers may amend their plan documents to allow participants to carry over up to $500 of unused amounts to the following plan year. (The limit was increased to $550 as of January 1, 2020.) Doing so allows participants to spend the carryover amounts on qualifying medical expenses incurred during the following plan year. A carryover of unused amounts does not affect the indexed $2,500 annual limit. A plan year may allow either a rollover or a grace period for unused amounts for the same plan year but not both. Carryovers only apply for qualifying medical expenses; plans may not allow participants to carry over unused amounts for dependent care or other expenses. The carryover amount does not reduce the participant's maximum FSA contribution for the next plan year. Accordingly, a person who carries over $550 to the next plan year and who also contributes $2,500 to their FSA for that plan year may be able to receive reimbursements from his or her FSA for up to $3,050 of eligible medical expense during that plan year. In order for an individual to be able to carry over unused amounts, the plan must be amended to permit this type of a carryover.

== California notice ==
Employers in California that sponsor flexible spending accounts must notify participants of any "deadline to withdraw funds before the end of the plan year." The notice must be sent to all participants who work in California. Employers must provide the required notice in at least two methods (email, telephone, text message, postal mail, and in-person), only one of which may be electronic. The law is effective for plan years beginning on or after January 1, 2020.

== History ==
Section 134 of the Revenue Act of 1978 gave tax-favorable treatment to flexible spending accounts for medical expenses.

In 1984, the Internal Revenue Service issued a ruling that, while flexible spending accounts were allowable, employees must elect a certain amount for the plan each year and that any unused amounts would be forfeited at the end of the year. Until that point, some employers had set up flexible spending account plans that allowed employees to simply request reimbursement of any qualifying medical expense with no preset annual limit and no risk of forfeiture by employees.

In 1997 and 1998, the Internal Revenue Service detailed circumstances when an employee could make changes to an annual election in a flexible spending account. Eligible events that would allow a change in annual election include a change in marital status, a change in the number of dependents, a change in a spouse's or dependent's employment status, a strike or a lockout, a leave of absence under the Family and Medical Leave Act, a change employment status (same as above), a change in a dependent's eligibility status, a significant change in the costs for or coverage by an employer-sponsored health plan, a change in the residence or work site of the employee or employee's spouse or dependent, the participant's failure to pay premiums, a change based on special enrollment rights under the Health Insurance Portability and Accountability Act, a court-ordered change, and entitlement to either Medicare or Medicaid.

In 2000, employers began to issue debit cards to participating employees to make it easier to access flexible spending account funds.

In September 2003, the Internal Revenue Service issued a ruling saying that certain over-the-counter medical expenses could be covered under flexible spending account plans.

Effective January 1, 2013, the Patient Protection and Affordable Care Act ((PPACA) essentially required flexible spending accounts to limit employees' annual elections to no more than $2,500, with small increases each year based on inflation. Over-the-counter medications became ineligible expenses as well.

In 2013, the Internal Revenue Service issued a ruling that permitted flexible spending plans for health care expenses to allow employees to roll over up to $500 in unused funds from one plan year to the following plan year.

Due to the COVID-19 pandemic, between January 1 and December 31, 2020, the Internal Revenue Service allows a health flexible spending account plan and a dependent care flexible spending account plan to allow employees to enroll mid-year, revoke an existing election on a prospective basis, or replace an existing election on a prospective basis. In response to Executive Order 13877, the Internal Revenue Service said that a health flexible spending account plan may increase the unused carryover amounts from $500 to a maximum of $550.

== See also ==
- FSA Eligibility List
- Health savings account
- Revenue Act of 1978, the first law that created this kind of account.
