= 2020 United States federal budget =

U.S. budget from October 1, 2019 to September 30, 2020

2020 Budget of the United States federal government
- Submitted: March 11, 2019
- Submitted by: Donald Trump
- Submitted to: 116th Congress
- Total revenue: $3.420 trillion (actual); 16.3% of GDP
- Total expenditures: $6.552 trillion (actual); 31.3% of GDP
- Deficit: $3.132 trillion (actual); 15.0% of GDP
- Website: BUDGET OF THE U.S. GOVERNMENT

The United States federal budget for fiscal year 2020 ran from October 1, 2019 to September 30, 2020. The government was initially funded through a series of two temporary continuing resolutions. The final funding package was passed as two consolidated spending bills in December 2019, the Consolidated Appropriations Act, 2020 (H.R. 1158) and the Further Consolidated Appropriations Act, 2020 (H.R. 1865). A series of supplemental appropriations bills were passed beginning in March 2020 in response to the COVID-19 pandemic.

== Budget proposals ==
The Trump administration's budget proposal was released on March 11, 2019.

On August 1, 2019, the Bipartisan Budget Act of 2019 (H.R. 3877) was passed by the House. The next day, on August 2, 2019, the bill was passed by the Senate and signed into law by President Trump. This act increases spending by $320 billion over levels set in the Budget Control Act of 2011 and removes the possibility of budget sequestration.

== Appropriations legislation ==
On September 26, 2019, Congress passed the Continuing Appropriations Act, 2020, and Health Extenders Act of 2019 (H.R. 4378) which contained a continuing resolution lasting until November 21. On November 21, Congress passed the Further Continuing Appropriations Act, 2020, and Further Health Extenders Act of 2019 (H.R. 3055) which extended temporary funding until December 20.

A final appropriations deal was announced on December 16. The appropriations legislation was divided into two bills: the Consolidated Appropriations Act, 2020 (H.R. 1158) contained the appropriations acts for Defense, Commerce–Justice–Science, Financial Services and General Government, and Homeland Security, while the Further Consolidated Appropriations Act, 2020 (H.R. 1865) contained the remaining acts.

Supplemental appropriations were passed in response to the COVID-19 pandemic:

- Coronavirus Preparedness and Response Supplemental Appropriations Act, 2020 (H.R. 6074), passed on March 6, 2020
- Families First Coronavirus Response Act (H.R. 6201), passed on March 18
- Coronavirus Aid, Relief, and Economic Security Act (H.R. 748) passed on March 27
- Paycheck Protection Program and Health Care Enhancement Act (H.R. 266) passed on April 24

== Major initiatives ==
- $1.4 billion was provided for the Mexico–United States barrier, the same as the previous year. No provision was included to ban the transfer of funds from other accounts to barrier construction, but the $3.6 billion the Trump administration had previously transferred from military construction accounts was not replaced.
- Taxes for Cadillac insurance plans and medical devices and a health insurance fee were all permanently repealed.
- The Export–Import Bank of the United States was extended for seven years.
- $12.5 million is provided to each of the National Institutes of Health and Centers for Disease Control and Prevention for research into gun violence. The 1996 Dickey Amendment, which banned using federal funds to advocate for gun control, had the effect of stopping federal research on gun violence despite it not being specifically banned. The 2020 appropriations legislation retained the Dickey Amendment, but clarified that it does not prohibit federal gun violence research.
- Science research funding was increased for several agencies. Funding for the National Institutes of Health was increased 7%, the National Science Foundation by 2.5%, the Department of Energy Office of Science by 6.3%, ARPA-E by 17%, NASA space science by 3.4%, National Institute of Standards and Technology by 4%, Agricultural Research Service by 8.5%, and basic research programs at the Department of Defense by 3%.
- Military and federal civilian employee pay was increased 3.1%.
- $425 million was provided for election security grants.
- The SECURE Act, which liberalized access to retirement plans, was enacted as part of the bill.
- The age limit for use of tobacco was raised to 21 nationwide.
- Enactment of the CREATES Act

== Total revenue ==
=== Receipts ===
Receipts by Source – Actual
1. Individual income tax (47%)
2. Social Security/other payroll tax (38.3%)
3. Corporate income tax (6.2%)
4. Excise tax (2.5%)
5. Estate and gift taxes (0.5%)
6. Customs duties (2%)
7. Miscellaneous receipts (3.4%)

Receipts by source: (in billions of dollars)

Source	Actual
Individual income tax	$1,608.7
Corporate income tax	$211.8
Social Security and other payroll tax	$1,310.0
Excise tax	$86.8
Estate and gift taxes	$17.6
Customs duties	$68.6
Other miscellaneous receipts	$117.7
Total	$3,421.2

== See also ==
- 2020s in United States political history
