= Coronavirus relief bill =

Several coronavirus relief bills have been considered by the federal government of the United States:

- Coronavirus Preparedness and Response Supplemental Appropriations Act, 2020, enacted March 6, 2020; $8.8 billion
- Families First Coronavirus Response Act, enacted March 18, 2020; $104 billion
- CARES Act, enacted March 27, 2020; $2.2 trillion
- HEROES Act, passed by the House of Representatives on May 15, 2020, but never enacted into law; $3 trillion
- Consolidated Appropriations Act, 2021, enacted December 27, 2020; included $900 billion in COVID-19 relief
- American Rescue Plan Act of 2021, enacted March 11, 2021; $1.9 trillion
