= Cancel rent =

Tenant rights movement in the United States

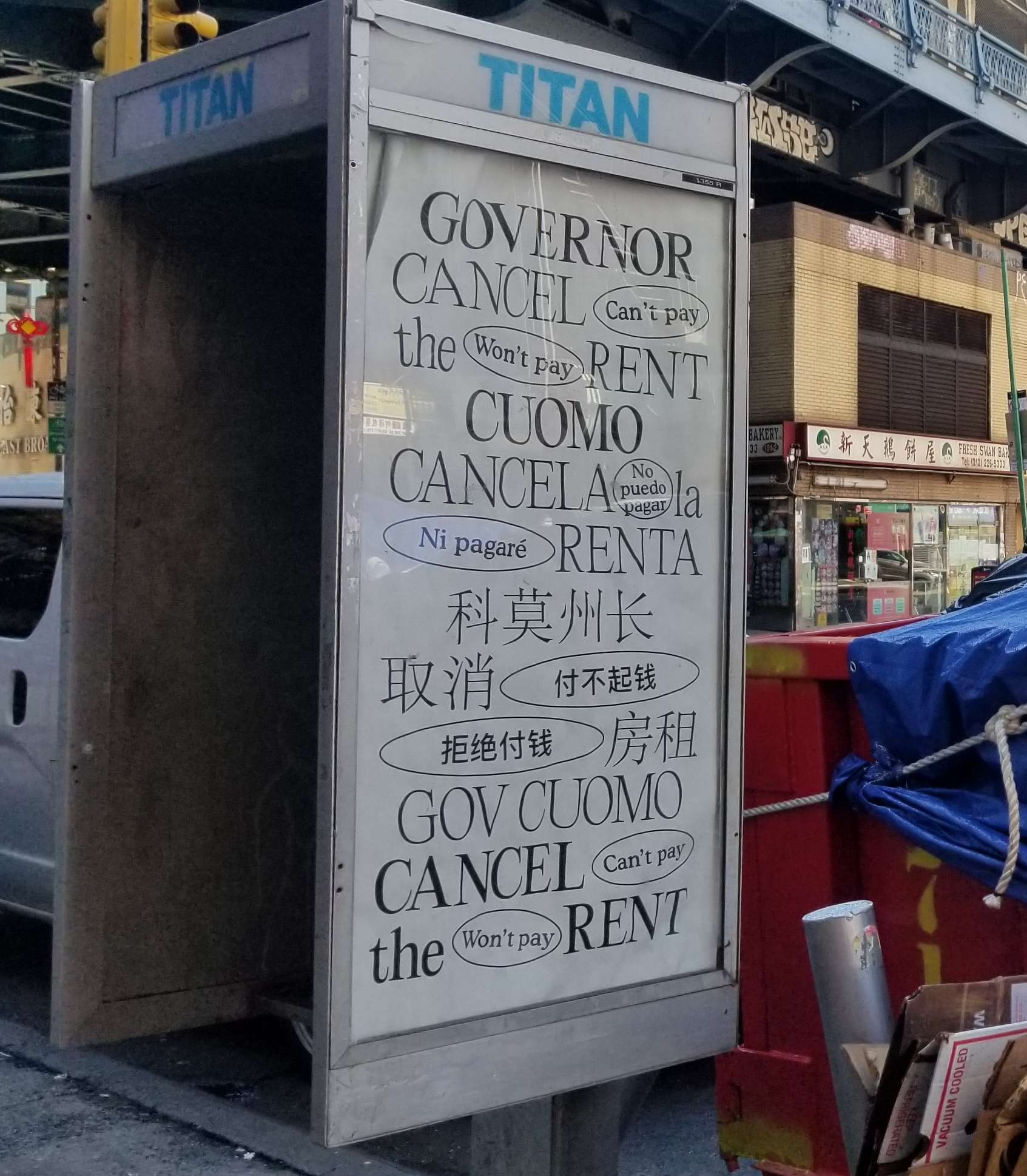
"Cancel rent" poster in Chinatown, New York City, July 2020

Cancel rent is a slogan and tenant rights movement in the United States, which advocates for the cancellation of rental payments and suspension of mortgage payments during the coronavirus pandemic. Activists and organizations have also presented other demands, which include the cancellation of housing-related expenses (such as utility payments), cancellation of late fees for housing payments, the establishment of a landlord hardship fund, an increase in emergency housing, and an eviction moratorium. The movement was triggered by the economic impact of the pandemic, in which mass business closures and employee layoffs resulted in financial insecurity for many Americans. Tenants faced a range of issues, including the inability to pay rent, harassment or intimidation from landlords, and potential eviction. This situation put tenants at risk of damaged credit ratings, food insecurity, and homelessness. Consequently, activists, tenants rights organizations, and some politicians have called for the cancellation of rent.

The movement has inspired protests and rent strikes in cities such as New York City, Washington, D.C., Los Angeles, San Francisco, Chicago, and Philadelphia, in collaboration with grassroots organizations. It has also become a popular hashtag on social media (#cancelrent). Some politicians have introduced supportive legislative proposals, such as the Rent and Mortgage Cancellation Act, introduced by Representative Ilhan Omar, and Emergency Housing Protections and Relief Act of 2020, introduced by Representative Maxine Waters. Local and state politicians have brought forth proposals, such as Bill S8125A, introduced Michael Gianaris. According to Amna A. Akbar in a New York Times opinion piece, the "cancel rent" movement stands alongside defund the police and the Green New Deal as part of a broad, left-wing movement to "...upend the status quo and redistribute power from elites to the working class."

== History ==
=== Housing as a human right ===
During the Great Depression, Catherine Bauer Wurster, a young architecture critic, argued that housing should be a public utility and human right in Modern Housing (1934). She wrote that such changes would only occur when people "demanded a positive program of good housing—not merely for some vague, hypothetical 'slum-dwellers,' but for themselves and their families." The book was out of circulation for decades, until it was republished by University of Minnesota Press in April 2020.

In 1944, President Franklin Delano Roosevelt proposed a Second Bill of Rights during his State of the Union speech, which included the right to decent housing. In 1948, the United States signed the Universal Declaration of Human Rights (UDHR), which included adequate housing as human right. The UDHR was non-binding, but the right to adequate housing was codified in International Covenant on Economic, Social and Cultural Rights (ICESCR). The United States signed the ICESCR in 1966, but it has not been ratified.

In 2011, the United States made commitments to the U.N. Human Rights Council to "reduce homelessness," "reinforce safeguards to protect the rights" of homeless people, and to work toward affordable housing for all people. In 2015, the United States provided support for a recommendation to the "Guarantee the right by all residents in the country to adequate housing, food, health and education, with the aim of decreasing poverty, which affects 48 millions of people in the country.” In October 2016, the United States signed onto the New Urban Agenda, which came out of the U.N. Habitat III conference. The New Urban Agenda called for signatories to "...commit to promote national, sub-national, and local housing policies that support the progressive realization of the right to adequate housing for all..."

=== Affordable housing crisis ===
Beginning in the early 1980s, the United States experienced large cutbacks on affordable and public housing programs, such as Section 8. Under the presidency of Ronald Reagan, funding for housing authorities was cut when they were considered to be performing poorly. These housing cuts are believed to have contributed to the negligence, crime, and mismanagement that became associated with public housing in cities such as Chicago. By the end of the decade, many public housing buildings faced serious safety and maintenance issues, such as mold, pipes that leaked raw sewage, broken elevators, and malfunctioning incinerators. These problems were documented by the National Commission on Severely Distressed Public Housing (1989), which eventually brought $6 billion from the Department of Housing and Urban Development (HUD) to replace distressed buildings with mixed-income housing.

By 2018, three quarters of polled Americans believed that housing was a human right. However, since 2008, the United States had seen a sharp rise in rental and housing costs, which has resulted in an affordable housing crisis. For example, in Los Angeles, the average rental price increased by 65% between 2010 and 2019. In San Francisco, rental prices rose 70% between 2010 and 2019, with the average apartment rental costing $3,680. In New York City, rental prices increased by 31% between 2010 and 2018, according to data collected by StreetEasy. Meanwhile, many cities have seen a decrease in low-cost rental units, with a total decrease of 4 million units between 2011 and 2018. Furthermore, federal housing policy has often prioritized homeownership over renting, such as spending approximately three times as much on mortgage-interest deduction than on housing vouchers.

The United States also has a homelessness problem. According to a 2017 report, there were 553,742 homeless people in a given night in the United States, compared to 4,751 in the United Kingdom. According to 2019 data, the rate of homelessness has been on the rise for three years in a row, with a 3% increase that year. While homelessness has declined in some states, it has seen significant growth in other states, such as California, where it increased by 16.4% in 2019. Some activists and organizations, such as the National Alliance to End Homelessness, say that affordable housing is the solution to the homelessness crisis.

Some politicians have advocated for the expansion of affordable housing. In 2010, Jimmy McMillan ran for governor of New York under the Rent Is Too Damn High Party. In 2019, Representative Alexandria Ocasio-Cortez said that affordable housing should be a "legislated human right." During the 2019-20 Democratic primaries, candidates such as Bernie Sanders and Kamala Harris discussed the right to affordable housing.

=== Coronavirus pandemic ===
During the coronavirus pandemic, a movement emerged to "cancel rent" in cities across the United States. Many people lost all of their income, or a substantial portion of their income. In response, a movement grew to cancel all rent payments for the duration of the health and economic crisis.

== Rationale ==
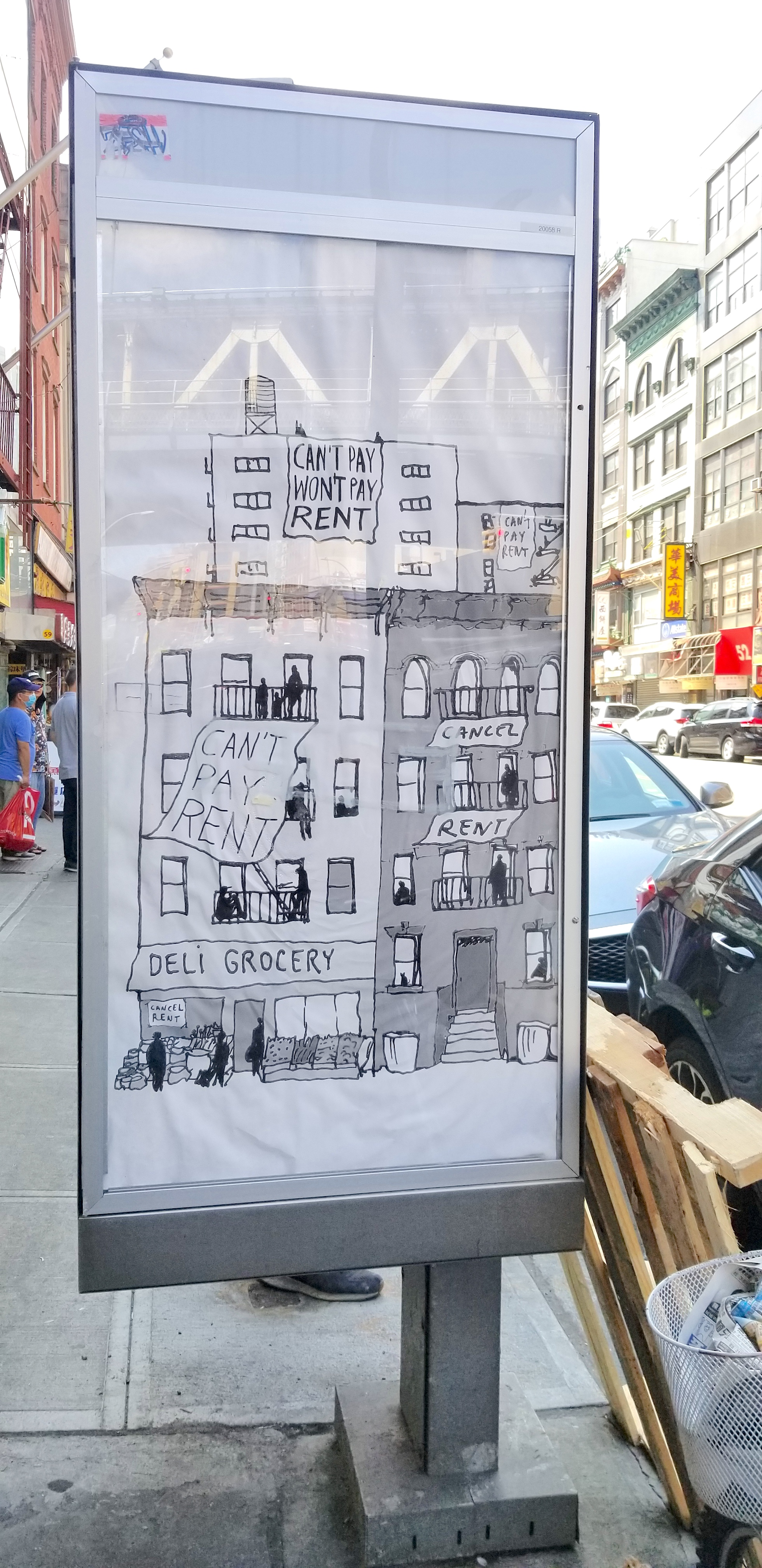
"Cancel rent" poster in New York City, August 2020

=== Financial insecurity ===
Activists argue that many tenants were in financially precarious situations before the pandemic. The economic impact of national shutdowns and social distancing has left people desperate. Before the coronavirus pandemic, only 47% of Americans had enough funds to cover three months of expenses. Two in five Americans and three in five renters could not pay for a $400 emergency, according to Federal Reserve data. Meanwhile, a large percentage of tenants were rent burdened, with 40.6% of rental residents spending at least 35% of their monthly household income on rent and utility bills, according to 2018 data provided by the United States Census Bureau.

With the closures of businesses and orders to shelter-in-place, millions of people abruptly lost their jobs. In the first six weeks of the pandemic, 30 million people filed for unemployment benefits. This created a situation under which they could not pay their rent, or they were at risk of soon being unable to pay rent. Some were also at risk of eviction or heavy back-pay fees when eviction moratoriums would be lifted in their states. In June 2020, the Aspen Institute reported that 19-23 million people were at risk of eviction. Based on Census data released on July 22, it was projected that 12 million households could be at risk of evictions, according to Stout, a consulting firm. Meanwhile, unemployed Americans experienced extreme challenges in finding new jobs, as many businesses were closed, laying off workers, or implemented hiring freezes. The $1200 stimulus checks were not enough money to cover rental costs for many Americans. While the $600 weekly checks have helped many tenants stay in their homes, other tenants have accrued rental debt and are at risk of ruined credit, food insecurity, eviction, homelessness. For these reasons, activists called on governments to intervene and provide protections, such as universal basic income, rent freezes, or cancellation of rent.

=== Rental prices ===
Since 2008, many cities have experienced significant increases in rental prices. Meanwhile, workers have often seen stagnant or declining wages, with a large share of job growth in low wage positions that pay "...barely enough to live on," according to a Brookings Institution 2020 report. Minimum wage workers could not afford a 1-bedroom apartment in 95% of U.S. counties, according to a 2020 report from the National Low Income Housing Coalition. Furthermore, if tenants lived in buildings with private equity landlords, they sometimes saw a decline in maintenance and repairs, growth in various fees, and a business-like casualness in evictions, as private equity firms focused on maximizing returns.

With the rise of the coronavirus crisis, tenants expected to see a drop in rental prices. In some cities, such as San Francisco, rental drops did occur. However, in some cities, such as New York City, rental prices have remained largely unchanged or have even increased. From April–May 2020, rental prices in New York City saw no changes, but there was a year-over-year increase of 0.7% in Manhattan and 3.7% in Brooklyn. In one July 2020 interview, an attorney for Legal Aid Society of New York said, "We haven't seen any changes... Landlords have not been giving any concessions." Meanwhile, home prices did not see significant changes either. Median home prices increased by 6.2% in year-over-year growth for the week ending on June 27, and homes were reportedly being sold faster than in 2019.

=== Landlord negotiations ===
Tenants have reported receiving threats and notices from landlords, demanding that rent is paid on time, despite the pandemic. They have reported tense negotiations with their landlords, in which landlords refused to reduce, postpone, or waive rental payments. They have also reported incidents of intimidation and illegal evictions. Some landlords have asked tenants to hand over money they received from their $1200 stimulus checks. Some landlords have provided false information on the documents that tenants must provide if they are unable to pay rent. In some cases, landlords have reportedly asked tenants for sex in exchange for rent, due to their lack of income during the pandemic. For these reasons, tenants cannot necessarily depend upon their landlords for assistance and relief, and they may be at risk of homelessness due to evictions.

=== Limits of unemployment benefits ===
==== Expanded unemployment benefits ====
Under the CARES Act, many unemployed Americans were eligible for a supplemental $600 per week, on top of their original state unemployment money. These benefits provided a critical form of assistance for many tenants. The original money they would have received would have been insufficient to cover their living costs. For example, ABC News shared the story of a woman in New York City who would receive $200 per week, which was below her rental cost, without the expanded unemployment benefits. However, the expanded unemployment benefits offered under the CARES Act expired by August 1, 2020, as the Democrats and Republicans disagreed over how to move forward. The two parties proposed different solutions–the HEROES Act (Democrats) and the HEALS Act (Republicans)–and no solution was met by August. This situation put Americans at increased risk of an inability to pay rent, resulting in potential eviction and homelessness. By August 2020, it was reported that the loss of the expanded unemployment benefits had worsened the situation for many people, and the call to cancel rent had been growing in popularity.

==== Undocumented immigrants ====
Undocumented immigrants and their families have been unable to receive federal assistance. It is estimated that about half of undocumented immigrant workers in New York City have lost their jobs due to the pandemic. These workers are unable to claim any unemployment benefits, which would help them cover rent and other bills.

Furthermore, the CARES Act only permits the payment of $1,200 stimulus checks to households with no undocumented immigrants. This means that, if a citizen is married to an undocumented immigrant, they are ineligible to receive the stimulus check. In total, it was estimated that 1.2 million Americans were unable to receive a stimulus check due to this restriction.

==== Other restrictions ====
People who earn below a certain minimum wage, as determined by state laws, cannot receive unemployment benefits. People who have already exhausted their allocated benefits, due to previous claims, cannot receive benefits. There are also specific professions that make it very difficult to claim benefits as well. For example, real estate agents who are paid on commission can only receive benefits in six states.

=== Unequal treatment of renters ===
Activists argue that residential tenants have not been granted the same protections as homeowners and other groups. As part of the CARES Act, homeowners were able to defer mortgage payments, but tenants received no such protections at a federal level. Cea Weaver, campaign director for Housing Justice for All in New York, said "I think it’s pretty unfair for the half of the state that rents that a similar measure hasn’t been put forward." Furthermore, the CARES Act provided funds for the Department of Housing and Urban Development, which would focus on homelessness and rental assistance, but there were no such funds allocated for those at risk of housing insecurity.

== Response ==
In March 2020, New York Senate Deputy Leader Michael Gianaris submitted Senate Bill S8125A, which called for a 90-day rent suspension for any tenant or small business owner who had lost their income or been forced to close their business due to the pandemic. The bill was supported by Council Speaker Corey Johnson, Comptroller Scott Stringer, and a total of 22 Democratic state senators.

In April 2020, Minnesota Congresswoman Ilhan Omar introduced Rent and Mortgage Cancellation Act. This act called for a cancellation of all rental and mortgage payments in the United States for the duration of the coronavirus crisis. A relief fund would be established for landlords and mortgage holders, which would help them recover financial losses. The bill was co-sponsored by Alexandria Ocasio-Cortez, Ayanna Pressley, Rashida Tlaib, Pramila Jayapal, Mark Pocan, Veronica Escobar, Jesús "Chuy" García, and Grace Meng.

By May 2020, the New York Times called "#cancelrent" the "...New Rallying Cry for Tenants" (May 1, 2020), and the hashtag had trended on Twitter. It was reported that tenants in 57 buildings (2000 units total) had launched rent strikes in New York City.

In June 2020, it was announced that Ithaca, New York planned to become the first U.S. city to cancel rent payments. The city had passed a resolution that allowed the mayor to cancel rent debt for tenants and small business owners for the prior three months. In September 2020, it was reported that the city had made little progress in implementing rent cancellation. This failure was attributed to the limits of city government authority, which needed approval from the New York Health Department to enact the policy, as well as the unresolved questions raised by such a policy (such as landlord debt).

On June 29, Representative Maxine Waters presented the Emergency Housing Protections and Relief Act of 2020, which would provide $100 billion in emergency assistance for tenants and homeowners, as part of the HEROES Act. In her speech she explained, "America was facing an affordable housing crisis before this pandemic hit. With so many families struggling as a result of the pandemic, we are now on the precipice of an eviction and homelessness crisis like we’ve never seen in our lifetimes." The bill passed in the House of Representatives.

In July 2020, Manhattan Assembly member Yuh-line Niou and State Senator Julia Salazar sponsored a “Rent and Mortgage Cancellation Act of 2020." The act calls for the cancellation of rent for tenants and the cancellation of mortgages for small homeowners. The cancellation would extend for the duration of the statewide emergency, plus an additional 90 days.
