= Employer student loan contributions =

Employer student loan contributions are a type of employee benefit in the United States. With this benefit, employers pay back student loans on behalf of employees, at certain amount per month as decided by the employer. Companies are using this benefit as a way to attract and retain employees, especially millennial workers. This benefit has grown as education debt has increased. According to the Washington Post, student debt has nearly tripled since the early 1990s and averaged $35,000 in 2015.

Only about 3% of companies currently offer employer student loan contributions, according to a survey by the Society for Human Resources Management from June 2015. Prominent companies that have announced this benefit include Fidelity Investments, PricewaterhouseCoopers, Natixis Global Asset Management, Kronos, NVIDIA and law firm Orrick, Herrington & Sutcliffe.

Companies may work with a vendor to administer these payments.

Employer student loan contributions used to be taxable as regular income in the U.S. According to the Coronavirus Aid, Relief, and Economic Security Act, payments of student loan principal and interest by an employer to either an employee or a lender is not taxable to the employee if paid on or before December 31, 2020.
