= CREATES Act =

U.S. federal law

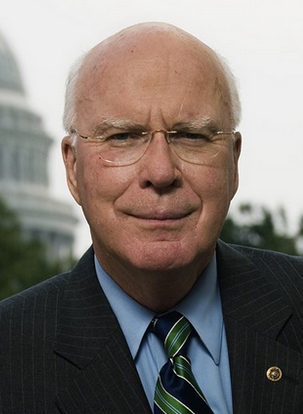
Senator Patrick Leahy

The CREATES Act of 2019 is a U.S. federal law which includes measures intended to reduce prices and increase the competitiveness of generic pharmaceutical drugs. Originally standalone legislation sponsored by Patrick Leahy in the Senate and David Cicilline in the House of Representatives, those bills were incorporated into the Further Consolidated Appropriations Act, 2020 which was signed into law on December 20, 2019.

The bill had been drafted in some form since 2016. Measures in the bill are intended to prevent pharmaceutical companies from blocking companies from producing generic drugs by refusing to sell drugs to the new companies, or taking advantage of safety regulation to block new drugs. Generic drug companies would be allowed to sue to gain access to samples. The resulting impact of the bill would be a reduction in generic drug prices via increased market competition.

The Congressional Budget Office estimated that the bill would save $3.8 billion over a 10-year period by reducing drug prices for Medicare and Medicaid.

== History ==
The bill was intended for inclusion in the February 2018 budget package. However, as a result of lobbying from pharmaceutical companies and other opposition, the provision was removed from the final budget provision.

== Support ==
The bill had support from conservatives including Senators Ted Cruz of Texas and Mike Lee of Utah. Liberal Democratic senators have also voiced support of the bill including Senators Dianne Feinstein of California and Sheldon Whitehouse of Rhode Island. The bill was also supported by prominent think tanks including conservative groups Heritage Action and FreedomWorks, as well as liberal think tanks Families USA and Public Citizen.

Public surveys found 75% of Americans said the President and Congress "need to do more" to reduce drug prices, while around 10% of those surveyed said that they think that they have done enough.

== Opposition ==
The CREATES Act was opposed by Pharmaceutical Research and Manufacturers of America (PhRMA). Opponents said the bill was not good solution to the issue of Risk Evaluation Mitigation Strategy with Elements to Assure Safe Use, or "REMS with ETASU" processes. These programs can include physician training, patient registries or follow-up testing.
