= COVID-19 and homelessness =

Effects of the COVID-19 pandemic on homeless people

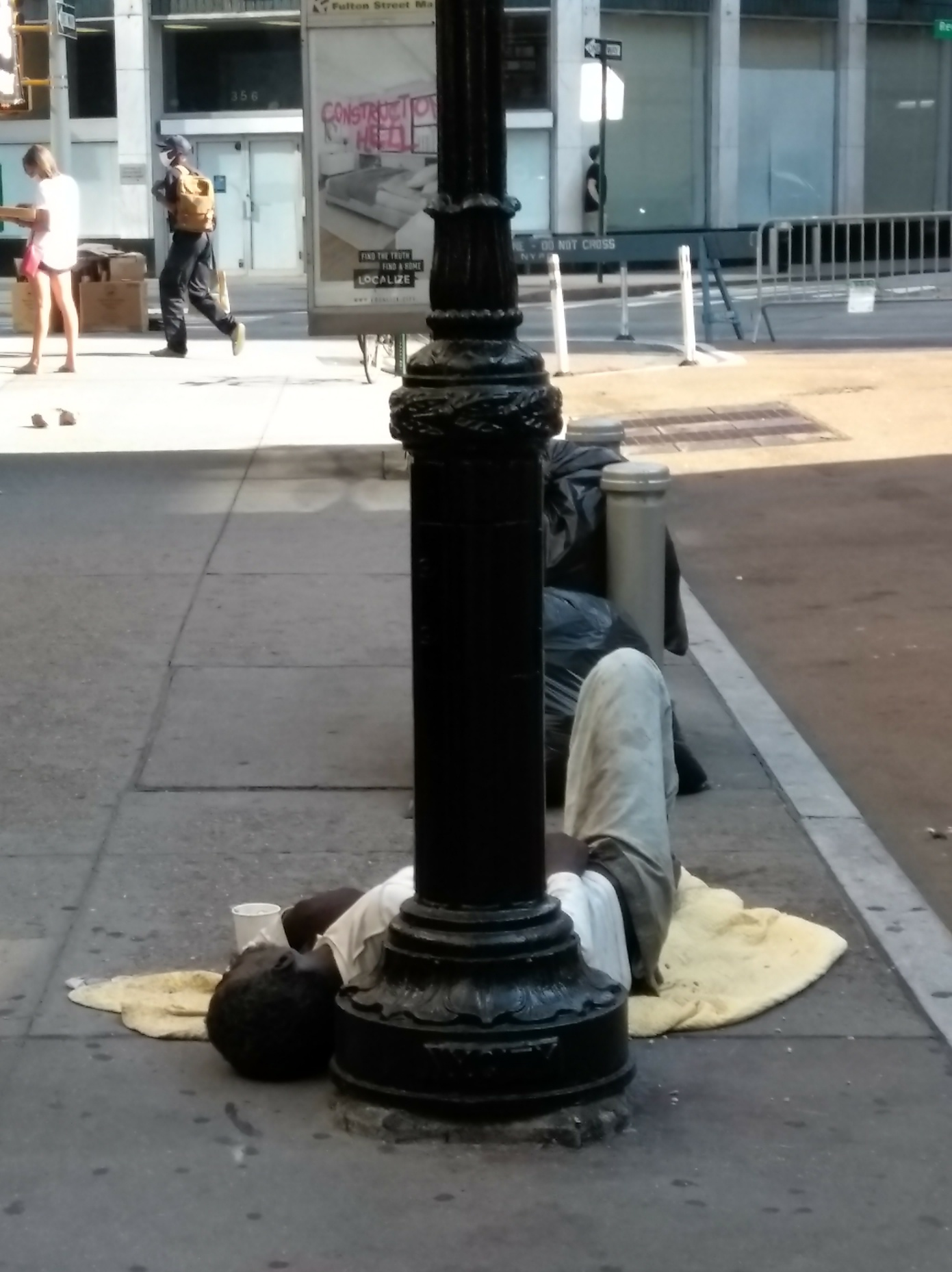
A homeless person in Brooklyn during the COVID-19 pandemic.

Homeless individuals are more likely to contract COVID-19 than those with permanent housing access. This is due to the environments that homeless people live in, which often suffer overcrowding and/or a lack of access to adequate sanitation. Homeless individuals are also more likely to suffer underlying health conditions, which increases the risk of death caused by COVID-19. The closure of public facilities has negatively impacted the homeless population, as reduced access to toilet facilities and support services has affected their hygiene and mental health respectively. Initiatives have been introduced by governments and at local levels in attempts to reduce the impact on the homeless.

== The increased risk of COVID-19 ==
Homeless individuals are at a disproportionately higher risk of contracting COVID-19, compared to the housed population. Most homeless people live in environments that increase the transmission of the virus. Formal and informal settings, such as shelters and encampments respectively, typically suffer crowding, and a lack of essential hygiene supplies that are required to limit transmission. Furthermore, contact tracing methods that are reliant on individuals having access to mobile phones and the internet are less effective for homeless individuals who are less likely to have access.

The percentage of homeless individuals that suffer from underlying health conditions is disproportionately higher than those with permanent housing access, increasing the risks associated with a COVID-19 infection. A study of a San Francisco homeless shelter found that 25% of the residents suffered from a comorbidity, and that the residents had an average age of 54. Age and underlying health conditions are two factors that increase the chances of an individual suffering severe COVID-19, which can cause death.

== Impact of the COVID-19 pandemic ==
The COVID-19 pandemic has made it more difficult for homeless individuals to meet everyday needs. The widespread closure of public amenities has decreased access to food and toilet facilities, and the economic impact of the pandemic has led to fewer donations to food banks.

Isolation and social distancing have had a negative impact on many homeless individuals' mental health. The closure of community centres, libraries and other public spaces; and the reduction of support services, has had a negative impact on social relationships and support. When there are homeless who rely on services for outreach, they are less inclined to substance abuse, but when this is no longer offered, alcohol and drug rates rise and can cause death to a lot of homeless users.

== Actions to reduce the impact ==
=== United Kingdom ===
The 'Everyone In' scheme was introduced to protect the homeless population during the COVID-19 pandemic. This included the provision of emergency accommodation to every homeless person, and those at risk of becoming homeless. The initiative has resulted in local authorities housing about 37,000 people since the start of the pandemic. In Cardiff, individuals sleeping rough decreased from around 80 in 2019, to eight in March 2021. It has been assumed that the 'Everyone In' initiative is the reason behind the relatively few deaths of the homeless population caused by COVID-19 in the UK, with figures from July 2020 showing that 16 homeless people had died.

=== USA ===
The Coronavirus Aid, Relief, and Economic Security Act (2020) promised to 'prevent, prepare for, and respond to coronavirus, among individuals and families who are homeless or receiving homeless assistance and to support additional homeless assistance and homelessness prevention activities to mitigate the impacts created by coronavirus'.

At the start of the pandemic, King County and the City of Seattle responded to the outbreak of COVID-19 by increasing the resources available to the homeless. By 26 March 2020, 1,893 spaces had been created for those experiencing homelessness, including 432 'isolation or quarantine spaces' and 612 spaces for those recovering from the virus. Jenny Durkan, the Mayor of Seattle, stated: "We know that individuals experiencing homelessness are some of the most at risk for exposure. Our partnership to create new shelter, de-intensify our current high capacity shelters, and create new spaces will go a long way in ensuring more people have the tools they need to stay healthy, the support they need if they are ill, and will help alleviate the growing pressures on our regional health care system."

Other US cities sought similar measures to reduce the density of shelters. San Diego, California, constructed a 1300-bed shelter that maintains social distancing, and Chicago, Illinois, added 700 beds to shelters and five emergency shelters. Columbus, Ohio, created a site staffed by medical professionals for homeless residents who had tested positive for COVID-19, and for those suffering the symptoms of the virus.

On April 18, 2020, California Governor Gavin Newsom announced a deal with the Motel 6 chain to house homeless individuals during the pandemic in the state.

In terms of testing, the focus on 'drive-through testing' was unsuitable for the homeless individuals without cars. To counter this issue, Mecklenburg County, North Carolina, arranged transport for those requiring a test and who were unable to drive.

In terms of access to food, Austin Public Health founded the Eating Apart Together (EAT) Initiative, which sent encampments weekly bags of food and sanitary supplies. A similar initiative was set up in Philadelphia, where the Step Up to the Plate Program offered 10,000 meals per week to homeless residents.

=== Canada ===
The Government of Canada announced additional spending of $157.5 million to aid homeless individuals during the pandemic, including those at risk of homelessness. At a local level, a study of homeless individuals in Calgary was carried out, and the sharing of drinks was found to be a potential avenue for transmission. Disposable paper cups were subsequently provided to emergency shelters and other supportive sites. The intervention proved popular and helped to endorse awareness of COVID-19.

=== Australia ===
Australia pledged an increase in funding to help the homeless population during the COVID-19 pandemic. The combined state funding reached $229 million (AUD), which was primarily spent on moving individuals out of clustered shelters and off the streets, and into 'self-contained accommodation'.
