= Paycheck Protection Program and Health Care Enhancement Act =

2020 US federal law; "Phase 3.5" of fiscal COVID-19 pandemic relief

- Long title: Making appropriations for the Department of the Interior, environment, and related agencies for the fiscal year ending September 30, 2019, and for other purposes.
- Nicknames: Additional Emergency Appropriations for Coronavirus Response
- Enacted by: the 116th United States Congress
- Effective: April 24, 2020

Citations
- Public law: Pub. L. 116–139 (text) (PDF)

Codification
- Acts amended: Coronavirus Aid, Relief, and Economic Security Act

Legislative history
- Introduced in the House as H.R. 266 (Department of the Interior, Environment, and Related Agencies Appropriations Act, 2019) by Betty McCollum (D–MN) on January 24, 2019 (Note: The bill was introduced and initially passed the House in 2019 with a different name, less content, and with a narrower purpose.); Committee consideration by House Committee on Appropriations; Passed the House on January 11, 2019 (240–179); Passed the Senate as the Paycheck Protection Program and Health Care Enhancement Act on April 21, 2020 (voice vote) with amendment; House agreed to Senate amendment on April 23, 2020 (388–5, 1 Present (Note: Voted no: Andy Biggs, Ken Buck, Jody Hice, Thomas Massie, Alexandria Ocasio-Cortez. Voted present: Justin Amash)); Signed into law by President Donald Trump on April 24, 2020

Paycheck Protection Program and Health Care Enhancement Act (H.R. 266) is a $484 billion law that increases funding to the Paycheck Protection Program and also provides more funding for hospitals and testing for COVID-19. The law was enacted as a response to the outbreak of the COVID-19 pandemic.

The bill passed the Senate by voice vote on April 21, 2020. The bill passed the House of Representatives by a vote of 388-5 on April 23. President Donald Trump signed the bill into law on April 24, 2020.

== Background ==
At the time the legislation was enacted, more than 50,000 Americans had died from the virus and the pandemic had caused major economic damage, with 26 million people (about 20% of U.S. workers) filing for unemployment assistance over the preceding five weeks. The bill is referred to as "Phase 3.5" of Congress's coronavirus response. It followed the first three phases: phase one "was an $8.3 billion bill spurring coronavirus vaccine research and development" (the Coronavirus Preparedness and Response Supplemental Appropriations Act, 2020), which was signed into law on March 6, 2020. The second phase was "an approximately $104 billion package largely focused on paid sick leave and unemployment benefits for workers and families" (the Families First Coronavirus Response Act), which had been enacted March 18, 2020. Phase three was the Coronavirus Aid, Relief, and Economic Security Act ("CARES Act"), a $2 trillion aid bill that provided checks to many Americans and forgivable loans to small businesses, signed into law on March 27, 2020.

The Paycheck Protection Program and Health Care Enhancement Act is referred to as "Phase 3.5" as it includes "interim" funding that replenishes one of the programs established by the CARES Act (Phase 3). The CARES Act created the $349-billion Paycheck Protection Program, which provided low-interest loans to small businesses that were forgivable if they maintained their employees and payroll. The $349 billion was fully allocated within 13 days. During those 13 days, 1.6 million loans were approved by nearly 5,000 banks and other lenders.

== Negotiations and passage ==
PPPHCEA as signed into law

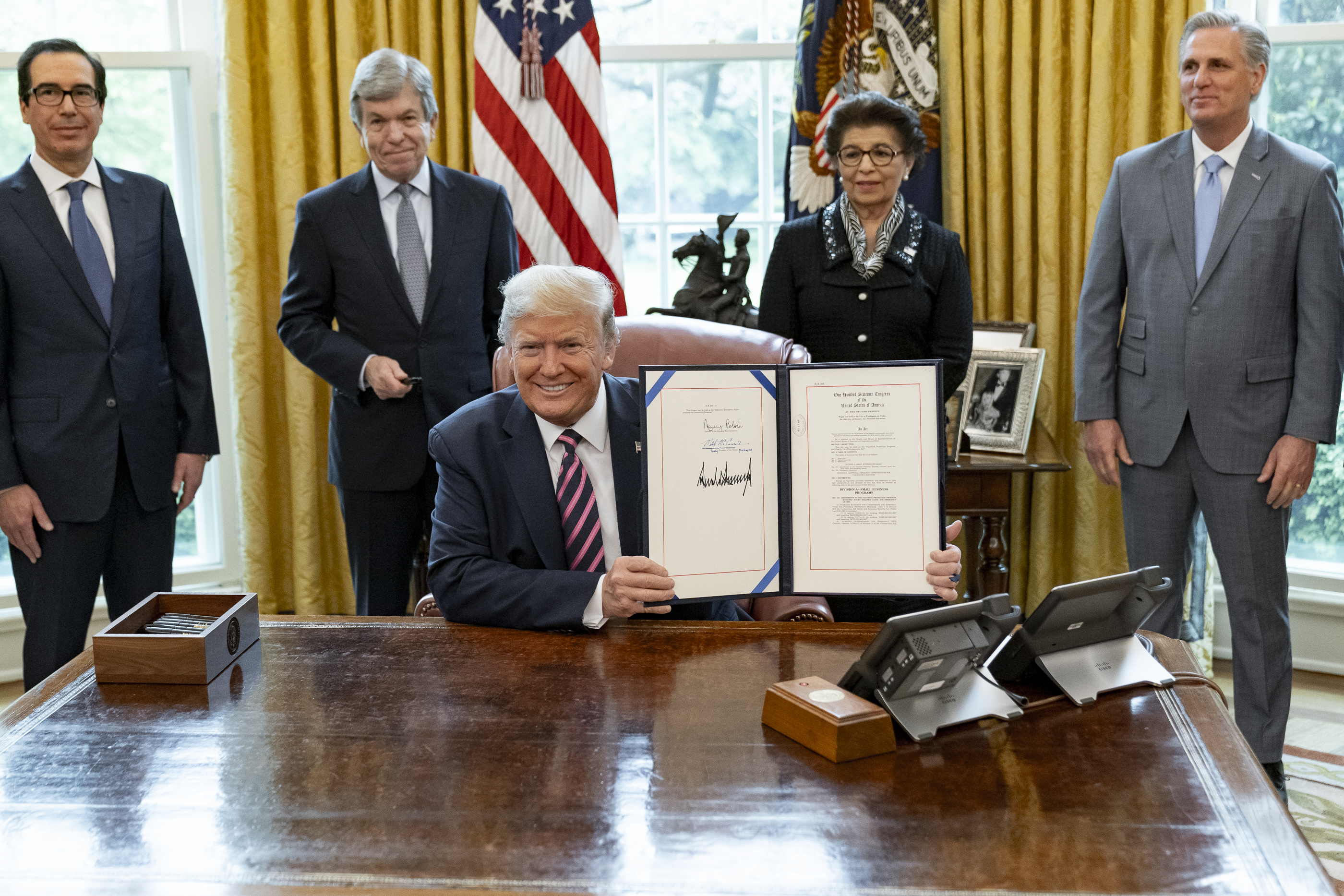
President Trump in the Oval Office after signing the bill into law on April 24, 2020

Senate Democrats wanted to add $250 billion to the Paycheck Protection Program. Senate Republicans wanted for some of the funding be set aside for rural and minority-owned small businesses. Senate Democrats also wanted to add funding for disaster assistance loans and grants, for hospitals, and for states and municipalities. Senate Democrats also wanted a 15-percent increase in the size of benefits from the Supplemental Nutrition Assistance Program (SNAP).

The version of the bill passed by the Senate included the expanded funding for rural and minority communities, for SBA disaster funding, and the money for hospitals and testing, but it did not include more funding for state and local governments, nor the increased SNAP benefits.

The bill passed the Senate by voice vote on April 21, 2020. The bill passed the House of Representatives by a vote of 388–5 on April 23. The five House "no" votes were four right-wing Republicans (Thomas Massie, Andy Biggs, Ken Buck, and Jody Hice) and one left-wing Democrat (Alexandria Ocasio-Cortez). The near-unanimous passage of the legislation through Congress reflected a broad political consensus that more economic aid was necessary. Trump signed the bill into law on April 24, 2020.

Senate Majority Leader Mitch McConnell rejected calls from Democrats and state governments to provide aid to state and local governments, which are experiencing significant budget shortfalls due to lost revenue from the pandemic. (States cannot currently declare bankruptcy, although that could be changed through legislation.) After the Senate voted to pass the bill, McConnell said he would prefer that states declare bankruptcy rather than have the federal government give the states money. McConnell disparaged the proposals to provide aid to the states as "free money" and characterized the requests as seeking a "Blue State Bailout." Governor Andrew Cuomo of New York called McConnell's suggestion of placing states in bankruptcy "one of the saddest, really dumb comments of all time" and accused him of hyperpartisanship that would deprive police, firefighters, and health-care workers of necessary funding. Cuomo also pointed out that New York contributes $116 billion more to the federal government than it receives, while McConnell's home state of Kentucky receives $148 billion more than it contributes to the federal government. McConnell's remarks were also criticized by some Republican governors.

== Provisions ==
Provisions of the Paycheck Protection Program and Health Care Enhancement Act include the following:

- Appropriates an additional $320 billion of funding for the Paycheck Protection Program (PPP), which provides low-interest loans for payroll costs and other expenses to small businesses that are forgivable under certain circumstances. Of that amount, $60 billion is for PPP loans made by small banks, small credit unions, and community financial institutions.
- Appropriates an additional $10 billion for emergency Economic Injury Disaster Loans.
- Expands eligibility for emergency Economic Injury Disaster Loans to farms and agricultural-related businesses.
- Appropriates $50 billion for Small Business Administration disaster loans.
- Appropriates an additional $75 billion to the Public Health and Social Services Emergency Fund for health care providers' expenses or lost revenues related to coronavirus.
- Appropriates $25 billion to the Public Health and Social Services Emergency Fund for researching, developing, validating, manufacturing, purchasing, administering, and expanding capacity for COVID-19 testing.
- Appropriates $2.1 billion for salaries for the Small Business Administration.

== See also ==
- Paycheck Protection Program
- Coronavirus Aid, Relief, and Economic Security Act
