= Elementary and Secondary School Emergency Relief Fund =

Government program created in response to COVID-19

The Elementary and Secondary School Emergency Relief Fund, also known as ESSER. is a $190 billion program created by the U.S. federal government's economic stimulus response bills, the Coronavirus Aid, Relief, and Economic Security Act (CARES Act), Consolidated Appropriations Act, 2021, the American Rescue Plan Act of 2021 (ARP Act), passed by the 116th and 117th U.S. Congress. Originally created under the CARES Act to assist schools with creating healthy learning environments, return students to classrooms, and address local needs, the ESSER fund was bolstered twice with additional funds in the CRRSA Act, known as ESSER 2.0, as well as the ARP Act, known as ESSER 3.0.

== Background ==
=== Timeline of bills ===
As schools began to close in response to the COVID-19 pandemic in the United States, U.S. lawmakers looked to provide funding to make sure students would return to classrooms quickly and safely. On March 25, 2020, Idaho became the last U.S. state to close public school buildings, leaving all public schools in the nation closed. Just two days after the Idaho closures, the U.S. federal government passed the CARES Act, which started multiple programs to offer assistance to employers, workers, and public education. The 116th Congress allocated $13.2 billion in relief funds from the CARES Act to be directed to K-12 public education across the country, through the new program called the Elementary and Secondary School Emergency Relief fund (ESSER). These billions of dollars were to be sent to State Education Agencies, which would then allot each school district an amount based on federal guidelines.

In a second stimulus bill passed on December 27, 2020, the Coronavirus Response and Relief Supplemental Appropriations Act, provided an additional $54.3 billion in relief funds to K-12 public education. This second round of education relief funding was called "ESSER 2.0" by the U.S. Department of Education. A third round of relief funding, ESSER 3.0, sent $122 billion to K-12 public education on March 11, 2021 through the American Rescue Plan Act signed by President Joe Biden. In total, $190 billion in relief fund was sent to K-12 education in response to the pandemic, more than three times what the federal government annually spends on education.

== Funding allocations ==
The amount each state received in federal funding widely varies. Including ESSER 1, 2.0, and 3.0 funds, total relief funding allocations ranged from $471,572,928 for Wyoming to $23,436,636,090 for California

The federal government set up a dashboard that provides how much ESSER funding was allocated to each state through the Education Stabilization Fund dashboard. The dashboard also provides the amount each state has spent, which is updated on a monthly basis.

== Use of funds ==
The federal government provided guidance through the U.S. Department of Education on how state and local education agencies (school districts) should use the relief funds. Recognizing that school districts have unique needs, the guidance provided wide flexibility on how funds could be spent, through twelve broad areas of uses. Approved uses include addressing local needs, approved uses through previous non-relief federal funding, and using funds to maintain staffing levels.

Due to the broad guidance of acceptable use of funds, studies have shown public school districts have spent relief dollars on a wide array of initiatives from increasing staff sizes, building new or renovating current buildings, providing stipends and bonuses to staff, technology, and student mental health.

However, because of the broad acceptable use of funds, some school districts have received criticism for using relief funds on projects that do not relate to learning loss or the pandemic. Notably, a school district in Wisconsin used 80% of their relief funds to construct new football fields with synthetic turf and another in Texas spent funds on an urban bird sanctuary. The federal government is also aware of fraud in the ESSER program. Due to the large amount of funds and lack of specified uses, fraud is a concern and questions have been raised for private contracts. The Metro Nashville Public Schools paid for a $14 million contract with relief funding to a newly created private entity. In the contract, federal funds were used to build a two-page website with basic pandemic information at the cost of nearly $2 million. Additional purchases in the contract paid over $4,000 an hour to an employee for information technology services.

The White House chief coordinator of for stimulus spending told journalists that "There is no question that immense fraud took place", in relation to the federal relief programs, though state education agencies have provided some oversight of the funding by having to approve school district funding plans before money has been spent. Even with this oversight, reports have published multiple spending items that have little relation to the pandemic or learning loss, including budgeting relief funds on walk-in coolers, retractable bleachers, administrator travel, and imitation cash and coins.
