= Customs duties in the United States =

The United States imposes tariffs (customs duties) on imports of goods. The duty is levied at the time of import and is paid by the importer of record. Customs duties vary by country of origin and product. Goods from many countries are exempt from duty under various trade agreements. Certain types of goods are exempt from duty regardless of source. Customs rules differ from other import restrictions. Failure to properly comply with customs rules can result in seizure of goods and criminal penalties against involved parties. The United States Customs and Border Protection (CBP) enforces customs rules.

== Import of goods ==
Goods may be imported to the United States subject to import restrictions. Importers of goods may be subject to tax and/or customs duty (“tariff”) on the imported value of the goods. “Imported goods are not legally entered until after the shipment has arrived within the port of entry, delivery of the merchandise has been authorized by CBP, and estimated duties have been paid.” Importation and declaration and payment of customs duties is done by the importer of record, which may be the owner of the goods, the purchaser, or a licensed customs broker. Goods may be stored in a bonded warehouse or a Foreign-Trade Zone in the United States for up to five years without payment of duties.

Goods must be declared for entry into the U.S. within 15 days of arrival or prior to leaving a bonded warehouse or foreign trade zone. The importer of record declares the transaction value of the goods and country of origin, along with other information. The declarations must include an invoice and packing list (or equivalent) listing all goods. CBP then assesses duty, which must be paid by the importer of record before goods can be released. Many importers participate in a voluntary self-assessment program with CBP. Special rules apply to goods imported by mail.

All goods imported into the United States are subject to inspection by CBP.

Some goods may be temporarily imported to the United States under a system similar to the ATA Carnet system. Examples include laptop computers used by persons traveling in the U.S. and samples used by salesmen.

== Origin ==
Rates of tax on transaction values vary by country of origin. Goods must be individually labeled to indicate country of origin, with exceptions for specific types of goods. Rules of origin are used to determine the country of origin. Goods are considered to originate in the country with the highest rate of duties for the particular goods unless the goods meet certain minimum content requirements. These minimum content requirements may vary under certain trade agreements or special arrangements. Reduced rates of duty apply under these agreements and arrangements for certain classes or subclasses of goods in certain circumstances. Extensive modifications to normal duties and classifications apply to goods originating in Canada or Mexico under the United States–Mexico–Canada Agreement (USMCA).

== Classification ==
All goods that are not exempt are subject to duty computed according to the Harmonized Tariff Schedule for the United States. The Harmonized Tariff Schedule provides the applicable tariff rates and statistical categories for all merchandise imported into the United States. This lengthy schedule includes 99 chapters and provides rates of duty for each class of goods. Most goods are classified based on the nature of the goods, though some classifications are based on use.

== Duty rate ==
Customs duty rates or Import duty rates may be expressed as a proportion of value or dollars and cents per unit. Rates based on value vary from zero to 35% in the 2023 schedule. Rates may be based on relevant units for the particular type of goods (per ton, per kilogram, per square meter, etc.). Some duties are based in part on value and in part on quantity. Until recently, the United States applied a customs tariff that was among the lowest in the world: 3% on average. However, with increased tariffs on Chinese goods, as of May 2019, the US has the highest tariff rate among all developed nations or developed countries with a trade-weighted tariff rate of 4.2%.

Where goods subject to different rates of duty are commingled, the entire shipment may be taxed at the highest applicable duty rate.

== Exemptions ==
Many categories of goods are subject to zero customs duty. Such goods must still be declared. Some goods and goods from some countries are exempt from duty. These reductions of duty are based on classification and origin.

== Procedures ==
Imported goods are generally accompanied by a bill of lading or air waybill describing the goods. For purposes of customs duty assessment, they must also be accompanied by an invoice documenting the transaction value. The goods on the bill of lading and invoice are classified and duty is computed by the importer or CBP. The amount of this duty is payable immediately, and must be paid before the goods can be imported. Most assessments of goods are now done by the importer and documentation filed with CBP electronically.

After duties have been paid, CBP approves the goods for import. They can then be removed from the port of entry, bonded warehouse, or Foreign-Trade Zone.

After duty has been paid on particular goods, the importer can seek a refund of duties if the goods are exported without substantial modification. The process of claiming a refund is known as duty drawback.

== Penalties ==
Certain civil penalties apply for failures to follow CBP rules and pay duty. In addition, goods of persons subject to such penalties may be seized and sold by CBP. In addition, criminal penalties may apply for certain offenses. Criminal penalties may be as high as twice the value of the goods plus twenty years in jail.

== Foreign-Trade Zones ==
Foreign-trade Zones are secure areas physically in the United States but legally outside the customs territory of the United States. Goods in a Foreign-Trade Zone are not considered imported to the United States until they leave the zone. Foreign goods may be used to manufacture other goods within the zone for export without payment of customs duties. Zones are limited in scope and operation based on approval of the Foreign-Trade Zones Board. Zones are generally near ports of entry, and may be within the warehouse of an importer.
