= HEROES Act =

Proposed stimulus package legislation in response to the COVID-19 pandemic

Seal of the United States Congress

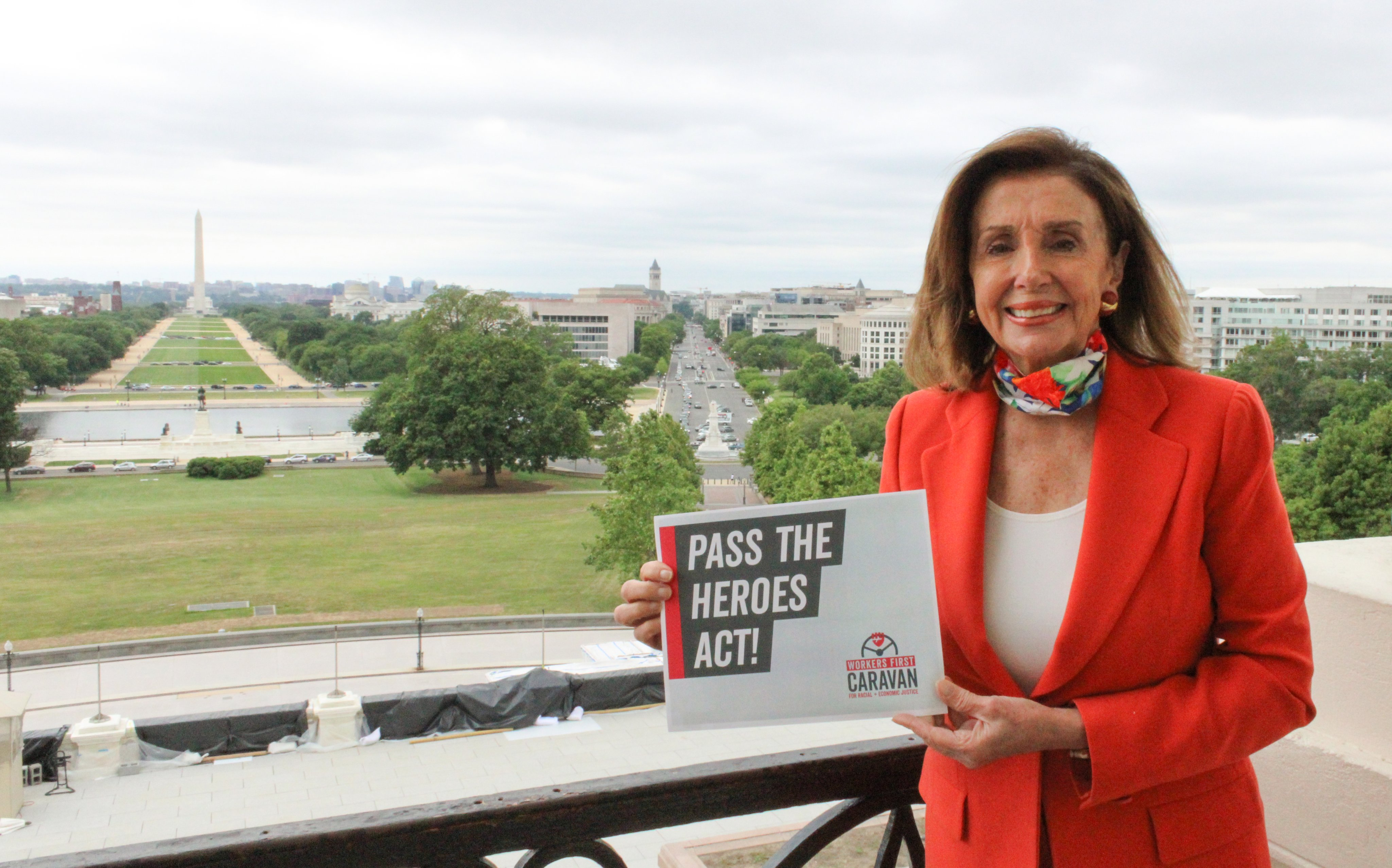
House Speaker Nancy Pelosi showing support for the Heroes Act

The Health and Economic Recovery Omnibus Emergency Solutions Act, or Heroes Act (H.R. 6800), was proposed legislation acting as a $3 trillion stimulus package in response to the COVID-19 pandemic, intended to supplement the earlier CARES Act stimulus package. The bill for this Act of Congress was proposed by Representative Nita Lowey, a Democrat from New York, on May 12, 2020, and was passed by the United States House of Representatives by a vote of 208–199 on May 15, 2020.

On December 21, 2020, Congress reached a deal for a different $900 billion stimulus package via the Consolidated Appropriations Act.

== Stipulations ==
The Heroes Act includes about $1.13 trillion of emergency supplemental appropriations to federal agencies, as well as economic assistance to governments at the state, local, tribal, and territorial levels. There would be about $485 billion in safety net spending, including the expansion of unemployment benefits, increased Supplemental Nutrition Assistance Program (SNAP) benefits, increased funding utilities payments and job training for low-income individuals, and a 25% increase in aid to disabled veterans. There would be about $435 billion for additional rebates, which would include an additional $1200 stimulus check per individual. There would be about $382 billion for health care, which would include reimbursing health care providers for lost revenue, covering the COBRA premium costs for employees laid off between March 2020 and January 2021, increasing funding for testing and contact tracing, eliminating cost-sharing for coronavirus treatment, and increasing funding for health agencies and centers. Employers would also need to implement infectious disease control panels.

There would be about $290 billion to support small businesses and employee retention, with modifications to the Paycheck Protection Program. This would expand employee retention credit, provide credits for employer expenses, extend and expand paid leave (such as paid sick days, family and medical leave), and provide a 90% income credit for self-employed individuals. There would be about $290 billion to reduce income taxes and $191 billion for student loan relief and funding for higher education. There would be about $202 billion for housing-related costs and expenses, including the establishment of an emergency rental assistance fund and a homeowner's assistance fund. Some eviction and foreclosure moratoriums would be expanded as well, being extended for up to another year and expanding the moratorium to cover all renters and homeowners rather than specific cases as previously done in the CARES Act. There would be about $190 billion for hazard pay for essential workers. In addition, there would be $32 billion for communication systems (such as the U.S. Postal Service), $48 billion for pensions and retirement relief, $31 billion for agricultural spending, and $254 billion for a limited business loss deductions.

== Status ==
After the bill's passage in the House, Republicans in the Senate called it "dead on arrival", saying it was "unrealistic" and a "partisan offering". It was given a hearing in the U.S. Senate Committee on Small Business and Entrepreneurship on July 23, 2020, but no Senate vote was held. Some progressives also threatened to vote against the bill prior to its passage, saying it did not go far enough, and that any payments to citizens needed to be recurring. Additional payroll support for businesses needed to be included in the act, business liability protections had to be limited, as well as that any aid to businesses needed to be targeted more at small and medium-sized enterprises rather than larger corporations.

On July 24, 2020 (two months following the passage of the Heroes Act), Senate Majority Leader Mitch McConnell said that he hoped a package could be agreed on "in the next few weeks", with Treasury Secretary Steve Mnuchin saying that there was a "fundamental agreement" on a $1 trillion package, which would include the $1200 stimulus checks, as well payroll tax cuts wanted by some Republicans, and that relief checks would be available by August 2020.

On July 27, 2020, McConnell announced the proposal of the Health, Economic Assistance, Liability Protection and Schools (HEALS) Act, a smaller $1 trillion package. The HEALS Act includes increased funding for schools and higher learning institutions, as well as hospitals. The HEALS Act would not provide additional funding for state and local governments short on tax revenue due to shutdowns and business closures, and would also reduce expanded unemployment benefits from $600 per week to $200.

After a late-August phone call with Mnuchin, Pelosi said: "Sadly, this phone call made clear that Democrats and the White House continue to have serious differences understanding the gravity of the situation that America's working families are facing." She indicated House Democrats were willing to negotiate reducing the House bill's cost to $2.2 trillion."
