= HEALS Act =

COVID-19 stimulus in the United States

Health, Economic Assistance, Liability Protection and Schools Act
- Long title: Health, Economic Assistance, Liability Protection and Schools Act
- Acronyms (colloquial): HEALS
- Announced in: the 116th United States Congress

Codification
- Appropriations: US$1.1 trillion

Legislative history
- Introduced in the Senate by Mitch McConnell (R–KY) on July 27, 2020

The Health, Economic Assistance, Liability Protection and Schools (HEALS) Act was a $1 trillion economic stimulus bill introduced in 2020 by the United States Senate during the COVID-19 pandemic, to supplement the earlier CARES Act.

== Legislative history ==
In early July, congressional Republicans were discussing the possibility of another stimulus package to be passed by both houses of congress before the 2020 August recess. Senate majority leader Mitch McConnell was conducting discussions with Republican senators, with his general priorities being a price tag under $1 trillion, and a bill that included liability protections for businesses. McConnell delayed unveiling the proposal several times due to a lack of consensus. Senators Rand Paul, Ted Cruz, and Ron Johnson all sharply criticized the package for its financial costs. The package was formally unveiled on July 27, as a legislative package including several individual bills.

After the package was introduced, disagreements remained between Senate Republicans and the president. McConnell voiced opposition to the package's inclusion of funding for an FBI building in Washington, D.C. Trump has stated that he was willing to sign a bill without the business liability protections which are a priority for McConnell.

== Provisions ==
The HEALS Act includes a second round of stimulus checks at the same $1,200 amount as in the CARES act, along with a "sequel" to the Paycheck Protection Program to mitigate layoffs. It also includes increased funding for schools, higher learning institutions, and hospitals. The HEALS Act would fund supplemental unemployment benefits at $200 per week, a reduction compared to the CARES Act's benefit of $600 per week. However, the bill provides a payroll tax credit to businesses equal to 50% of COVID expenses.

The Congressional Budget Office has not issued an official estimate of the cost of the bill, but the Committee for a Responsible Federal Budget has estimated the bill would cost $1.1 trillion.

The HEALS Act is the combination of eight bills:

- The American Workers, Families, And Employers Assistance Act (S. 4318) – The bill, introduced by senator Chuck Grassley, contains a $1,200 stimulus check, for individuals with incomes up to $75,000 the same as in the CARES Act. The bill also contains the supplemental employment benefits, with $600 per week through July 31, $200 per week through October 5th, and then becomes a payment of 70% of lost wages though December 31.
- The Safeguarding America’s Frontline Employees To Offer Work Opportunities Required To Kickstart The Economy (SAFE TO WORK) Act (S. 4317) – The bill, introduced by senator John Cornyn, establishes a liability shield for employers. The bill is similar to the protections passed in New York state by governor Andrew Cuomo.
- Continuing Small Business Recovery and Paycheck Protection Program Act (S. 4321) – The bill, introduced by senator Marco Rubio, is an extension of the Paycheck Protection Program, providing money for additional loans, while reserving loans only for companies with under 300 employees and at least a 50% reduction in gross receipts.
- Coronavirus Response Additional Supplemental Appropriations Act, 2020 (S. 4320) – The bill, introduced by senator Richard Shelby, contains a total of $306 billion in discretionary spending. Labor, Health and Human Services, Education and Related Agencies are appropriated the largest portion of funds at $226 billion, but the bill also includes $1.5 billion for NASA, $1.8 billion for a new headquarters for the Federal Bureau of Investigation, and ships for the United States Navy.
- Time to Rescue United States Trusts Act or the TRUST Act (S. 2733) – The bill, introduced by senator Mitt Romney is an updated version of the bill introduced in 2019. The bill would set up committees to produce a report regarding the financial health of the various federal trust funds (such as the Social Security Trust Fund). The bill has bipartisan cosponsors, including an endorsement from the Blue Dog Coalition, but is opposed by the AARP.
- Safely Back to School and Back to Work Act (S. 4322) – The bill, introduced by senator Lamar Alexander, defers student loan payments for borrowers with no income, funds scholarships for students returning to and starting at private schools, includes provisions related to medical stockpiles, diagnostic testing, and disease surveillance. The bill includes the provisions of the School Choice Now Act (S. 4284,) - The bill, introduced by senator Tim Scott, would move 10% of the education funding currently allocated by the CARES Act to fund state scholarship programs for private schools.
- Restoring Critical Supply Chains and Intellectual Property Act (S. 4324) – The bill, introduced by senator Lindsey Graham, includes four parts. First, the U.S. MADE Act, which was designed to decrease the United States' dependence on foreign countries for personal protective equipment manufacturing. Second, the Safeguarding American Innovation Act tightens oversight of federally funded researchers with ties to foreign governments. Third, the Creating Helpful Incentives to Produce Semiconductors (CHIPS) Act creates a 40% tax credit for semiconductor manufacturing, $10 billion to match state incentives, and $12 billion in R&D funding. Fourth, there is a section regarding mineral security.
- Supporting America’s Restaurant Workers Act (S. 4319) – The bill, introduced by senator Tim Scott, would allow businesses to deduct 100% of the cost of business meals in 2020, compared to the current 50% tax deduction.

== Comparison with HEROES Act ==
The HEALS Act has often been compared to the HEROES Act, a piece of proposed legislation passed by the United States House of Representatives on May 15, 2020, that provides $3 trillion in additional COVID-19 pandemic funding. Whereas the HEALS Act is made up of bills with Republican sponsors, the HEROES Act passed the house with largely Democratic support.

A major difference between the proposals concerns state and local governments. The HEALS Act provides no additional funding, while the HEROES Act allocates $1 trillion in additional aid to state and local governments. Another difference is on evictions and foreclosure, which were forbidden in certain cases under the CARES Act. The HEALS Act lets the provisions expire, while the HEROES Act extends it for up to another year and expands the moratorium to cover all renters and homeowners, instead of just the special cases covered in the CARES Act.
