= Coronavirus Preparedness and Response Supplemental Appropriations Act, 2020 =

Act of the US Congress enacted on March 6, 2020

Coronavirus Preparedness and Response Supplemental Appropriations Act
- Long title: Making emergency supplemental appropriations for the fiscal year ending September 30, 2020, and for other purposes.
- Announced in: the 116th United States Congress
- Sponsored by: Nita Lowey

Citations
- Public law: Pub. L. 116–123 (text) (PDF)

Legislative history
- Introduced in the House as the "Coronavirus Preparedness and Response Supplemental Appropriations Act, 2020" (H.R. 6074) by Nita Lowey (D-NY) on March 4, 2020; Committee consideration by Appropriations; Passed the House on March 4, 2020 (415–2); Passed the Senate on March 5, 2020 (96–1); Signed into law by President Donald Trump on March 6, 2020

The Coronavirus Preparedness and Response Supplemental Appropriations Act, 2020 (H.R. 6074) is an act of Congress enacted on March 6, 2020. The legislation provided emergency supplemental appropriations of $8.3 billion in fiscal year 2020 to combat the spread of coronavirus disease 2019 (COVID-19) and counter the COVID-19 pandemic, particularly the COVID-19 pandemic in the United States. The legislation passed the House 415–2 on March 4 and the Senate 96–1 on March 5, 2020. The legislation received broad bipartisan support.

== Proposal and negotiation process ==
On February 24, 2020, the Trump administration asked Congress for $2.5 billion in emergency funding to combat the pandemic. The Republican chairman of the Senate Appropriations Committee, Richard Shelby of Alabama, criticized the $2.5 billion as a "low ball" request. "Lawmakers on both sides of the aisle were alarmed by what they deemed as the president’s paltry request to fight the virus amid criticism that his administration has bungled its response and failed to keep the American people clued in about the potential severity of the outbreak." Shortly after the Trump administration requested the $2.5 billion, Senate Minority Leader Chuck Schumer unveiled a plan for "$8.5 billion in emergency funding to combat the coronavirus."

In the days leading up to the passage of the bill in the House and the Senate, negotiations had slowed down because of "partisan disagreements on providing affordable access to treatment." One of the main issues that caused disagreement and slow-down of the bill was vaccine affordability.

Several senators praised the process as cooperative and bipartisan. Senator Richard Shelby, chairman of the United States Senate Committee on Appropriations, stated "We worked together to craft an aggressive and comprehensive response that provides the resources the experts say they need to combat this crisis. I thank my colleagues for their cooperation and appreciate President Trump's eagerness to sign this legislation and get the funding out the door without delay." Senate Majority Leader Mitch McConnell stated on March 4, 2020, of the bill that: "The way to secure these urgently-needed resources with speed and certainty was to forgo partisan posturing, forgo micromanagement at the leadership level, and let bipartisan appropriators do their work."

The sponsor of the bill was representative Nita Lowey of New York, who chaired the House Appropriations Committee.

== Contents ==
The bill includes $8.3 billion in emergency funding to combat the COVID-19 pandemic. The $8.3 billion is divided into $7.8 billion in discretionary appropriations and $500 million in mandatory spending. The $500 million is for "Medicare telehealth mandatory spending, which would allow Medicare providers to furnish telemedicine services to seniors."

Broken down by category, the bill provides funding for the following purposes:

- More than $3 billion for "research and development of vaccines, as well as therapeutics and diagnostics"
- $2.2 billion "in public health funding to aid in prevention, preparedness and response efforts — including $950 million to support state and local agencies"
- Almost $1 billion for "medical supplies, health-care preparedness, Community Health Centers and medical surge capacity"
- $1.25 billion to fight COVID-19 internationally.

Broken down organizationally, the bill provides emergency supplemental funding for the following departments and agencies with the United States Department of Health and Human Services:

- Food and Drug Administration
- Centers for Disease Control and Prevention
- National Institutes of Health
- Public Health and Social Services Emergency Fund.

Outside of HHS, the bill provides additional funding for:

- Small Business Administration
- Department of State
- U.S. Agency for International Development.

== Passage ==
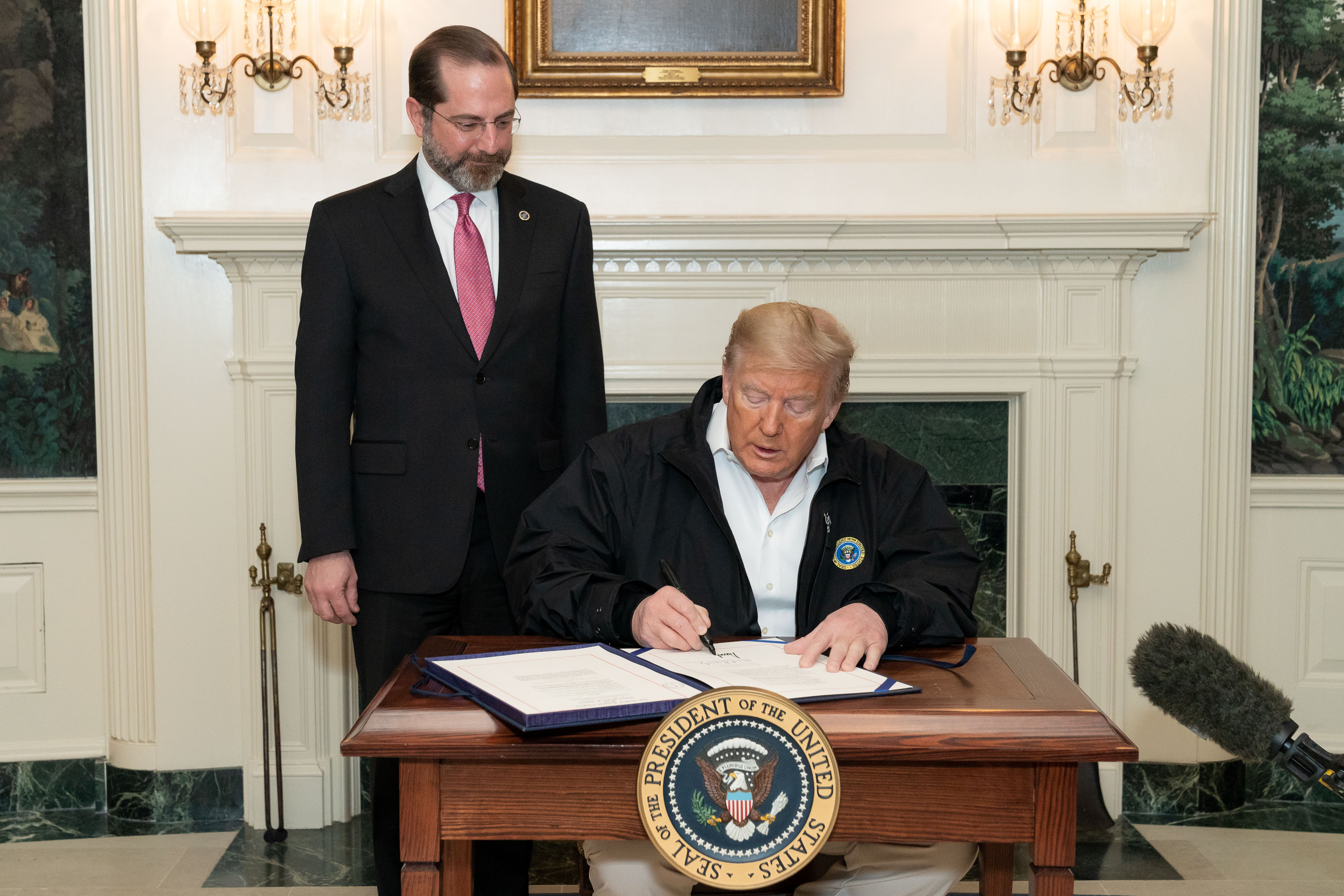
Trump, with Secretary of Health and Human Services Alex Azar signs the bill into law on March 6, 2020.

=== House ===
On March 4, 2020, the bill passed the House on an overwhelming 415–2 vote. Only two members, both Republicans, voted against the legislation: Representative Andy Biggs of Arizona and Representative Ken Buck of Colorado.

On the House floor shortly before the vote on the bill, Democratic Representative Nita Lowey, the sponsor of the bill and the chairwoman of the House Appropriations Committee, said, "While we all ardently hope that this public health emergency does not worsen, House Democrats will not hesitate to act again if we must augment this funding with more resources."

During the vote on the measure in the House, Republican Representative Matt Gaetz of Florida wore a gas mask on the House floor. Gaetz told journalists that "members of congress are human petri dishes." Gaetz received criticism from Representative Bobby Rush for "making light" of the coronavirus pandemic, and also from Walter Shaub, the former director of the United States Office of Government Ethics, who stated "Matt Gaetz mocked fear over the coronavirus."

=== Senate ===
On March 5, 2020, the bill passed the Senate by a 96–1 vote. Three senators—Senator Bernie Sanders of Vermont, Senator Elizabeth Warren of Massachusetts, and Senator Mike Enzi of Wyoming—did not vote. Sanders was campaigning for the 2020 Democratic nomination for president, while Warren ended her own campaign for the Democratic nomination the same day.

The lone Senator to vote against the bill was Rand Paul of Kentucky. Paul had proposed an amendment that would have offset some of the coronavirus funding with cuts to State Department Cultural Exchange programs and USAID. Paul threatened to block the coronavirus legislation if his amendment did not receive a vote. The amendment failed on an 80–16 vote.

=== President ===
On March 6, 2020, President Trump signed the bill into law in the Diplomatic Reception Room at the White House. At the time of signing, President Trump stated "So we’re signing the $8.3 billion. I asked for 2.5 and I got 8.3, and I’ll take it" and "So here we are, $8.3 billion. We’re doing very well. But it’s an unforeseen problem. What a problem. Came out of nowhere, but we’re taking care of it."

President Trump signed the bill on the same day that global coronavirus cases surpassed 100,000.

== Reaction ==
The passage of the legislation was supported by the American Hospital Association, the American Nurses Association, and the American Medical Association.

The U.S. Chamber of Commerce supported the bill's inclusion of Economic Injury Disaster Loans (EIDLs) for small businesses affected by the coronavirus. EIDLs are a type of a "structured low interest disaster loan program" administered by the U.S. Small Business Administration.

== See also ==
- Families First Coronavirus Response Act
- Coronavirus Aid, Relief, and Economic Security Act
- Operation Warp Speed
- List of bills in the 116th United States Congress
- List of acts of the 116th United States Congress
