= Families First Coronavirus Response Act =

2020 US federal law, "Phase 2" of pandemic relief

- Acronyms (colloquial): FFCRA
- Announced in: the 116th United States Congress
- Sponsored by: Nita Lowey

Citations
- Public law: Pub. L. 116–127 (text) (PDF)

Legislative history
- Passed the House on March 14, 2020 (363–40); Passed the Senate on March 18, 2020 (90–8); Signed into law by President Donald Trump on March 18, 2020

Major amendments
- Keep Kids Fed Act of 2022

The Families First Coronavirus Response Act is an Act of Congress (H.R. 6201) meant to respond to the economic impacts of the COVID-19 pandemic. The act provides funding for free coronavirus testing, 14-day paid leave for American workers affected by the pandemic, and increased funding for food stamps.

The bill was sponsored by House Appropriations Committee Chairwoman Nita M. Lowey (D–NY) and passed the United States House of Representatives early on March 14, 2020, before moving on to the United States Senate. President Donald Trump had voiced support for the legislative agreement. The Senate passed the legislation on March 18, 2020. Trump signed the bill into law later that day.

== Contents ==
In a statement, the White House said the law "provides paid leave, establishes free coronavirus testing, supports strong unemployment benefits, expands food assistance for vulnerable children and families, protects front-line health workers, and provides additional funding to states for the ongoing economic consequences of the pandemic, among other provisions."

The Act is effective on or by April 2, 2020.

Employers that are required to provide Emergency Paid Sick Leave and Emergency Paid Medical Leave must put a notice of employees' rights in a conspicuous location at work sites or its web sites, or send the poster to all employees by mail or email by April 1, 2020.

=== Emergency leave ===
==== Paid sick leave ====
An employer with fewer than 500 employees must allow an eligible employee to take Emergency Paid Sick Leave. Certain public employers are covered as well. All employees of the employer are counted toward the 500, not only the ones at any particular employee's work site. An employer is not required to give Emergency Paid Sick Leave to an employee who is a healthcare provider or an emergency responder.

An employee may use Emergency Paid Sick Leave if the employee is quarantined, a doctor advises the employee to self-quarantine, or the employee has COVID-19 symptoms and is waiting for a diagnosis. Under these circumstances, the employee must be paid at their regular rate of pay, up to a maximum of $511 per day or $5,110 total. An employer cannot require an employee to find a replacement worker to cover their shift. An employer cannot require an employee to take other paid vacation, paid sick leave, or paid personal leave before taking Emergency Paid Sick Leave.

Employees may also use Emergency Paid Sick Leave if the employee is caring for an individual under quarantine or medical self-quarantine, or if the employee is caring for a child whose school or place of care has been closed or is unavailable due to COVID-19 precautions. The child must be the employee's biological child, adopted child, foster child, stepchild, or legal ward, or a child of the employee standing in place of a parent. The child must be under 18 years of age or incapable of self-care because of a mental or physical disability. Under these circumstances, the employee must be paid at least two-thirds their regular rate of pay, up to a maximum of $200 per day.

Emergency Paid Sick Leave must be in addition to any benefits that employees already accrue. Emergency Paid Sick Leave cannot reduce existing employee benefits or rights.

A full-time employee may take up to 80 hours of Emergency Paid Sick Leave. A part-time employee may take up to the amount of hours they work in an average two-week period. The employee must give the employer as much notice as is practical. After taking Emergency Paid Sick Leave, the employer may require the employee to continue to notify the employer in order to continue receiving Emergency Paid Sick Leave.

Emergency Paid Sick Leave is not subject to the employer's share of social security tax, but it is taxable for the employer's share of Medicare tax.

Emergency Paid Sick Leave expires on December 31, 2020. Unused Emergency Paid Sick Leave does not rollover to the following year. Employers are not required to pay unused Emergency Paid Sick Leave if the employee's employment ends.

Employers receive refundable tax credits to offset the cost of providing employees with Emergency Paid Sick Leave, subject to certain caps. The tax credit is a dollar-for-dollar reduction to the employer's portion of social security tax. A self-employed individual may take their credit against their self-employment tax. The U.S. Treasury will makes deposits to the Social Security Trust Fund equal to the amount of tax credits given.

==== Paid family medical leave ====
An employer must give Emergency Family Medical Leave to eligible employees if the employer is a private employer and had fewer than 500 employees for each working day during each of 20 or more calendar weeks of the current or preceding year. All employees of the employer are counted toward the 500, not only the ones at any particular employee's work site. An employer is not required to give Emergency Family Medical Leave to an employee who is a healthcare provider or an emergency responder.

Emergency Family Medical Leave is available if an employee cannot work or telework because the employee needs to care for a child under 18 and the child's school or place of care is either closed or unavailable because of the COVID-19 public health emergency.

An employee may take up to 12 weeks of Emergency Family Medical Leave. The first 10 days of Emergency Family Medical Leave may be unpaid, but the employee must be allowed to use accrued paid leave in order to be paid during the first 10 days.

An employee who has already taken 12 weeks of leave under the Family and Medical Leave Act within the last 12 months is not eligible for an additional 12 weeks of Emergency Family Medical Leave. Such an employee could still be eligible for two weeks of Emergency Paid Sick Leave though.

After the first 10 days, the employer must continue to provide leave and pay the employee at least two-thirds of the employee's usual rate of pay for the employee's usual number of scheduled hours. If the employee's hours vary, then the employee's usual number of scheduled hours must be based on the employee's average scheduled hours during the last 6 months or the employer's reasonable expectation of hours to be worked at time of hire. The maximum required pay is $200 per day or $10,000 total to the employee.

After returning from Emergency Family Medical Leave, the employer must restore the employee to the employee's former position. An employer with fewer than 25 employees need not restore the employee to their former position if the position no longer exists, although the employee must later be restored if the position is restored to exist before the earlier of 12 months or the end of the COVID-19 emergency.

Emergency Family Medical Leave is not subject to the employer's share of social security tax, but it is taxable for the employer's share of Medicare tax.

Employers receive refundable tax credits to offset the compensation paid to employees while on Emergency Family Medical Leave and the group health insurance cost that is allocable to the Emergency Family Medical Leave. The tax credit is a dollar-for-dollar reduction to the employer's portion of social security tax. A self-employed individual may take their credit against their self-employment tax. The U.S. treasury will make deposits to the Social Security Trust Fund equal to the amount of tax credits given.

=== Coverage for COVID-19 testing and other health provisions ===
Employer-sponsored group health plans, Medicare, Medicaid, Children's Health Insurance Program (CHIP), TRICARE, Veteran's Affairs, federal worker health plans, and Indian Health Services are required to provide coverage for COVID-19 testing for all individuals enrolled and covered by the health plan with no copay or any other cost to the individual.

Treatment for an individual after being diagnosed for COVID-19 is neither required to be covered nor required to be free of cost to the individual.

Personal respiratory protective devices are considered to be countermeasures under the Public Readiness and Emergency Preparedness Act. A covered entity is immune from lawsuit and liability, except for willful misconduct, under federal and state law related to the device and the coronavirus pandemic, through October 1, 2024.

=== Expansion of unemployment benefits ===
The U.S. Department of Labor will provide $1 billion of emergency funding to state unemployment trust funds. The purpose of the emergency funding is to reduce eligibility requirements and increase access to unemployment benefits for individuals directly affected by COVID-19. Requirements to search for work and to wait a week before receiving unemployment benefits are waived.

=== Supplemental appropriations and program modifications ===
==== U.S. Department of Agriculture ====
The Act provides additional funding for the Special Supplemental Nutrition Program for Women, Infants, and Children (WIC) program, the Temporary Emergency Food Assistance Program (TEFAP), and the Supplemental Nutrition Assistance Program (SNAP). The Act gives grants to the Northern Mariana Islands, Puerto Rico, and American Samoa for nutrition assistance.

The U.S. Department of Agriculture's food assistance and nutrition programs now allow waivers of certain requirements related to school and adult-care food programs.

States are allowed to request waivers related to providing certain emergency Supplemental Nutrition Assistance Program benefits. These benefits were previously limited to three months over any three-year period for most able-bodied adults without dependents who did not work or participate in certain work or workfare programs. According to the Act, that time limit only applies if a state offers the individual a slot in a work or workfare program and the individual did not have good cause for failure to comply.

==== U.S. Department of Defense ====
The Act provides additional funding for the detection and diagnosis of coronavirus and testing-related visits by the Department of Defense.

==== U.S. Department of Health and Human Services ====
The Act provides additional funding for home-delivered nutrition services, congregate nutrition services, and nutrition services for Native Americans. The Act provides funding to Indian Health Service for the detection and diagnosis of coronavirus and testing-related visits. The Act also provides funding to pay for the detection and diagnosis of coronavirus and testing-related visits for uninsured individuals.

==== U.S. Department of the Treasury ====
The Act provides additional funding to the Internal Revenue Service to provide taxpayer services for carrying out the Act.

==== U.S. Department of Veterans Affairs ====
The Act provides additional funding for the detection and diagnosis of coronavirus and testing-related visits by the Department of Veterans Affairs.

== Negotiations ==
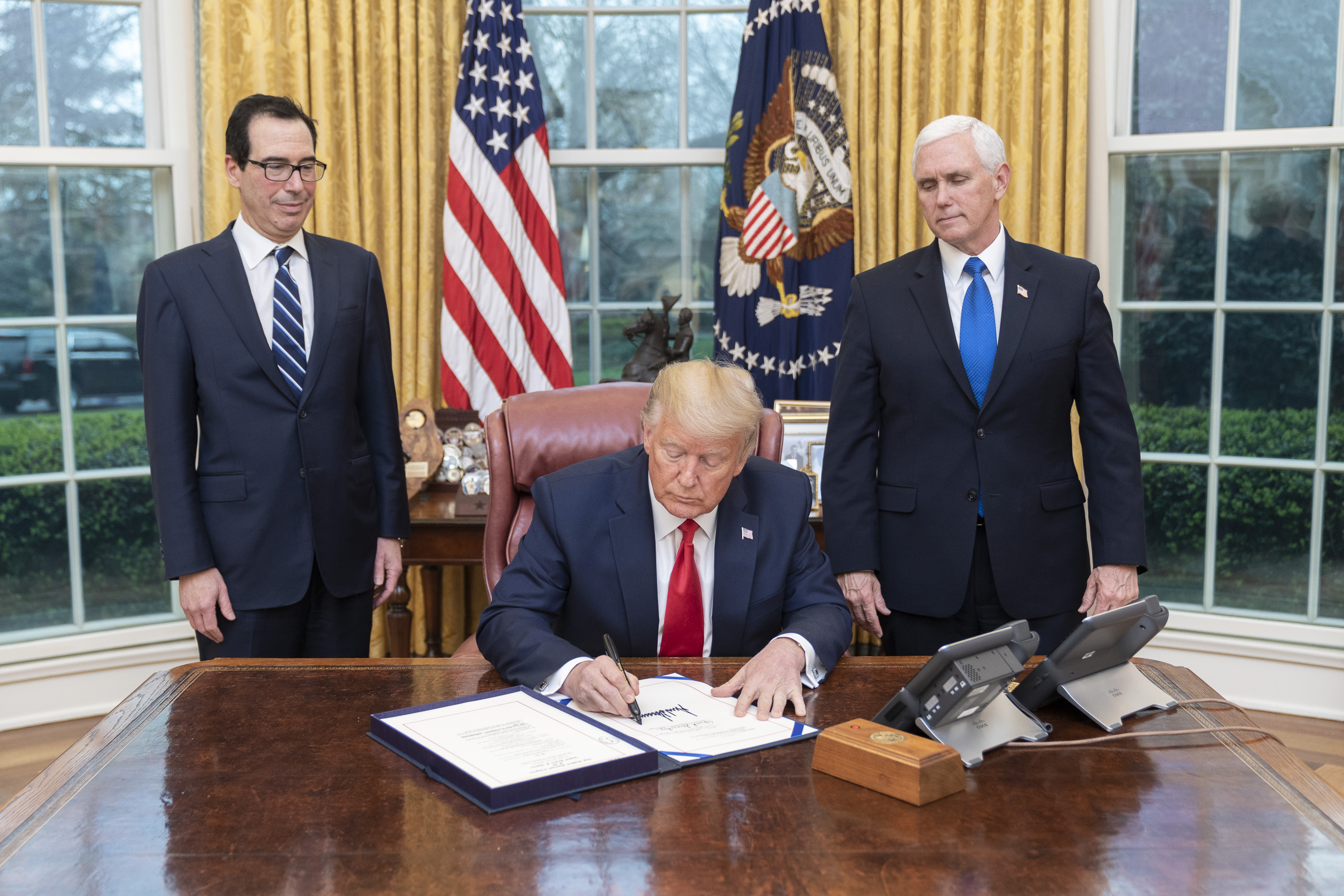
Trump – with Secretary Mnuchin (left) and Vice President Mike Pence (right) – signs the bill on March 18, 2020

Substantial negotiations for the bill happened between House Speaker Nancy Pelosi and Secretary of the Treasury Steven Mnuchin on March 12 and March 13; "Pelosi and Mnuchin exchanged at least 20 phone calls on Thursday and Friday as they tried to hammer out a proposal that Trump could support." Points of negotiations included the effectiveness of tax-credits being used "to offset the cost of Democratic-proposed sick leave provisions" and "how businesses can receive a tax credit for providing paid sick days and emergency leave for workers who are suffering from the coronavirus or helping take care of family members who contract the disease."

In a March 13 letter to her Democratic colleagues, Speaker Pelosi wrote, "Today, the House is taking the next step to put Families First. We are proud to have reached an agreement with the Administration to resolve outstanding challenges, and now will soon pass the Families First Coronavirus Response Act. We take great pride in the leadership of Chairs Lowey, Neal, Pallone, Scott, Peterson and McGovern, all the Committee and Subcommittee Chairs of Jurisdiction and the Rules Committee to craft this landmark legislation to protect families, which contains the priorities and provisions that Leader Schumer and I called for last weekend. We are especially grateful to the staffs of the Committees."

Soon after the draft of the bill was first released, Senate Majority Leader Mitch McConnell tweeted that the draft was "off-base" because "It does not focus immediate relief on affected Americans. It proposes new bureaucracy that would only delay assistance. It wanders into policy areas that are not related to the pressing issues at hand."

House Minority Leader Kevin McCarthy stated the bill "comes up short," criticizing the bill for the way it ensures "paid sick leave would take months to administer, long after the relief is needed." Some Senate Republicans said the bill would be too harsh on small businesses.

On the evening of Friday, March 13, President Trump tweeted his support for the bill. The President wrote, in a series of tweets, that "This Bill will follow my direction for free CoronaVirus tests, and paid sick leave for our impacted American workers. I have directed...." "....the Secretary of the Treasury and the Secretary of Labor to issue regulations that will provide flexibility so that in no way will Small Businesses be hurt. I encourage all Republicans and Democrats to come together and VOTE YES! I will always put...." "....the health and well-being of American families FIRST. Look forward to signing the final Bill, ASAP!"

On March 16, Congressman Louis Gohmert (R–TX) threatened to hold up the bill if certain technical problems are not worked out. Pelosi and Mnuchin worked to solve the problems.

At Republican insistence, the initial House version of the bill allowed the emergency leave provision to expire in a year and also allows the federal government to exempt certain employers with fewer than 25 employees from certain requirements.

== Votes ==
The House of Representatives passed the bill with broad bipartisan support in a vote that concluded at 12:30 AM on Saturday, March 14, 2020, in a 363–40–1 vote, with 26 not voting. Forty Republicans and no Democrats voted against the bill. Independent Representative Justin Amash voted present.

Senator Rand Paul introduced an amendment to the bill to require a social security number in order to receive the child tax credit, to allow the President the authority to transfer funds as necessary, and to end United States military operations and reconstruction activities in Afghanistan by December 31, 2020. The amendment failed in a vote of 3–95 with 2 not voting.

Senator Ron Johnson introduced an amendment to the bill to financial support provided through state-administered unemployment insurance systems and funds rather than having the provisions for Emergency Paid Sick Leave and Emergency Paid Family Medical Leave. The amendment failed in a vote of 50–48 with 2 not voting, since it needed 60 votes to pass under Senate rules.

Senator Patty Murray introduced an amendment to the bill to provide Americans with paid sick time and paid leave for their own health needs and their families' health needs. The amendment failed in a vote of 47–51 with 2 not voting.

On March 18, the Senate passed the bill with broad bipartisan support by a vote of 90–8 with 2 not voting. The two Senators not voting were Cory Gardner of Colorado and Rick Scott of Florida who were in quarantine after exposure to people who tested positive for coronavirus disease 2019. Later the same day, the President signed the bill into law.

== See also ==
- Coronavirus Preparedness and Response Supplemental Appropriations Act, 2020
- Coronavirus Aid, Relief, and Economic Security Act
- Operation Warp Speed
- List of bills in the 116th United States Congress
- List of acts of the 116th United States Congress
