= CARES Act =

COVID-19 stimulus in the United States

Coronavirus Aid, Relief, and Economic Security Act
- Long title: To provide emergency assistance and health care response for individuals, families, and businesses affected by the COVID disease.
- Acronyms (colloquial): CARES Act
- Enacted by: the 116th United States Congress
- Effective: March 27, 2020

Citations
- Public law: Pub. L. 116–136 (text) (PDF)

Legislative history
- Introduced in the House as H.R. 748 (Middle Class Health Benefits Tax Repeal Act of 2019) by Joe Courtney (D-CT) on January 24, 2019 (Note: It was introduced and initially passed the House in 2019 with a different name and content, and for a different purpose); Committee consideration by House Ways and Means; Passed the House on July 17, 2019 (419–6); Passed the Senate as the Coronavirus Aid, Relief, and Economic Security Act on March 25, 2020 (96–0) with amendment; House agreed to Senate amendment on March 27, 2020 (voice vote); Signed into law by President Donald Trump on March 27, 2020

Major amendments
- Paycheck Protection Program and Health Care Enhancement Act

United States Supreme Court cases
- Yellen v. Confederated Tribes of the Chehalis Reservation, No. 20-543, 594 U.S. 338 (2021)

The Coronavirus Aid, Relief, and Economic Security Act, (Note: Pub. L. 116–136 (text) (PDF), H.R. 748.) also known as the CARES Act, is a $2.2 trillion economic stimulus bill passed by the 116th United States Congress and signed into law by President Donald Trump on March 27, 2020, in response to the economic fallout of the COVID-19 pandemic in the United States. The spending primarily includes $300 billion in one-time cash payments to individual people who submit a tax return in America (with most single adults receiving $1,200 and families with children receiving more), $260 billion in increased unemployment benefits, the creation of the Paycheck Protection Program that provides forgivable loans to small businesses with an initial $350 billion in funding (later increased to $669 billion by subsequent legislation), $500 billion in loans for corporations, and $339.8 billion to state and local governments.

The original CARES Act proposal included $500 billion in direct payments to Americans, $208 billion in loans to major industry, and $300 billion in Small Business Administration loans. As a result of bipartisan negotiations, the bill grew to $2 trillion in the version unanimously passed by the Senate on March 25, 2020. It was passed by the House via voice vote the next day, and was signed into law by President Donald Trump on March 27. It was originally introduced in the U.S. Congress on January 24, 2019, as H.R. 748 (Middle Class Health Benefits Tax Repeal Act of 2019). To comply with the Origination Clause of the Constitution, the Senate then used H.R. 748 as a shell bill for the CARES Act, changing the content of the bill and renaming it before passing it.

Unprecedented in size and scope, the legislation was the largest economic stimulus package in U.S. history, amounting to 10% of total U.S. gross domestic product. The bill is much larger than the $831 billion stimulus act passed in 2009 as part of the response to the Great Recession. The Congressional Budget Office estimates that it will add $1.7 trillion to the deficits over the 2020–2030 period, with nearly all the impact in 2020 and 2021.

Lawmakers refer to the bill as "Phase 3" of Congress's coronavirus response. The first phase was the Coronavirus Preparedness and Response Supplemental Appropriations Act that provided for vaccine research and development. The Families First Coronavirus Response Act, which focused on unemployment and sick leave compensation, was phase 2. All three phases were enacted the same month.

An additional $900 billion in relief was attached to the Consolidated Appropriations Act, 2021, which was passed by Congress on December 21, 2020, and signed by President Trump on December 27, after some CARES Act programs being renewed had already expired.

Unemployment benefits under the CARES Act expired in 2020; the eviction moratorium was generally phased out by mid-2021; the deadline to apply for PPP loans expired in May of 2021; and bankruptcy protections expired May 27, 2022.

== Background ==
=== Reduction of economic activity ===
In response to the COVID-19 pandemic, dramatic global reduction in economic activity occurred as a result of the social distancing measures meant to curb the virus. These measures included working from home, widespread cancellation of events, cancellation of classes (or moving in-person to online classes), reduction of travel, and the closure of businesses.

In March, it was predicted that, without government intervention, most airlines around the world would go bankrupt. On March 16, the trade group representing the U.S. airline industry requested a $50 billion federal bailout.

On March 18, the National Restaurant Association wrote the President and Congress with an estimate that "the industry's sales will decline by $225 billion during the next three months, which will prompt the loss of between five and seven million jobs," accompanied by a request of $145 billion of aid to restaurants.

In an effort to gain Republican support for a large stimulus package that, at the time, was envisioned to be about $1 trillion, United States Secretary of the Treasury Steven Mnuchin told Republican Senators the United States unemployment rate could reach 20% if no government action was taken. Almost 3.3 million Americans filed for unemployment in the week ending March 21, "nearly five times more than the previous record of 695,000 set in 1982".

On March 20, Goldman Sachs predicted the U.S. gross domestic product would "decline by 24% in the second quarter of 2020 because of the coronavirus pandemic". Deutsche Bank predicted the U.S. economy would shrink by 12.9% in the second quarter of 2020.

=== Initial proposals ===
Two relief bills were signed by President Trump early in 2020: $8 billion on March 6, and $192 billion on March 18. It was apparent to Congress that these would not be sufficient. A much larger third package, which was to become the CARES Act, was negotiated.

In mid-March 2020, Democratic politicians Andrew Yang, Alexandria Ocasio-Cortez, and Tulsi Gabbard advocated for universal basic income in response to the COVID-19 pandemic in the United States; Gabbard suggested that it be a temporary measure until the crisis subsides. On March 13, Democratic representatives Ro Khanna and Tim Ryan introduced legislation to provide payments to low-income citizens during the crisis via an earned income tax credit. On March 16, Republican senators Mitt Romney and Tom Cotton stated their support for a $1,000 basic income, Romney saying it should be a one-time payment to help with short-term costs. On March 17, the Trump administration indicated that some payment would be given to non-millionaires as part of a stimulus package.

With guidance from the White House, Senate Majority Leader Mitch McConnell proposed a third stimulus package, amounting to more than $1 trillion. (Note: This included $300 billion to help small businesses with forgivable loans up to $10 million and $200 billion to support industries such as airlines, cruise companies, and hotels through loans and other measures. Democrats advocated for banning stock buy-backs to prevent these funds from being used to make a profit.) It was suggested that $200–500 billion would fund tax rebate checks to Americans who made between $2,500 and $75,000 in 2018 to help cover short-term costs via one or two payments of $600–1,200 per adult and $500 per child. Democrats prepared a $750 billion package as a counter-offer, which focused on expanding unemployment benefits instead of tax rebates. A compromise plan was made to set aside $250 billion for tax rebates and the same amount for unemployment.

=== Subsequent initiatives ===
On April 21, 2020, the Senate approved the Paycheck Protection Program and Healthcare Enhancement Act, providing $484 billion in additional funding to the existing Paycheck Protection Program, and President Trump signed it into law three days later. On May 15, 2020, the Democratic-controlled House passed a $3 trillion relief bill called the HEROES Act, but the Republican-controlled Senate never brought it to a vote. There was no other significant economic relief bill until late December 2020 when Congress reached an agreement on a $900 billion stimulus.

== Relief to healthcare corporations: hospitals, manufacturers, and distributors ==
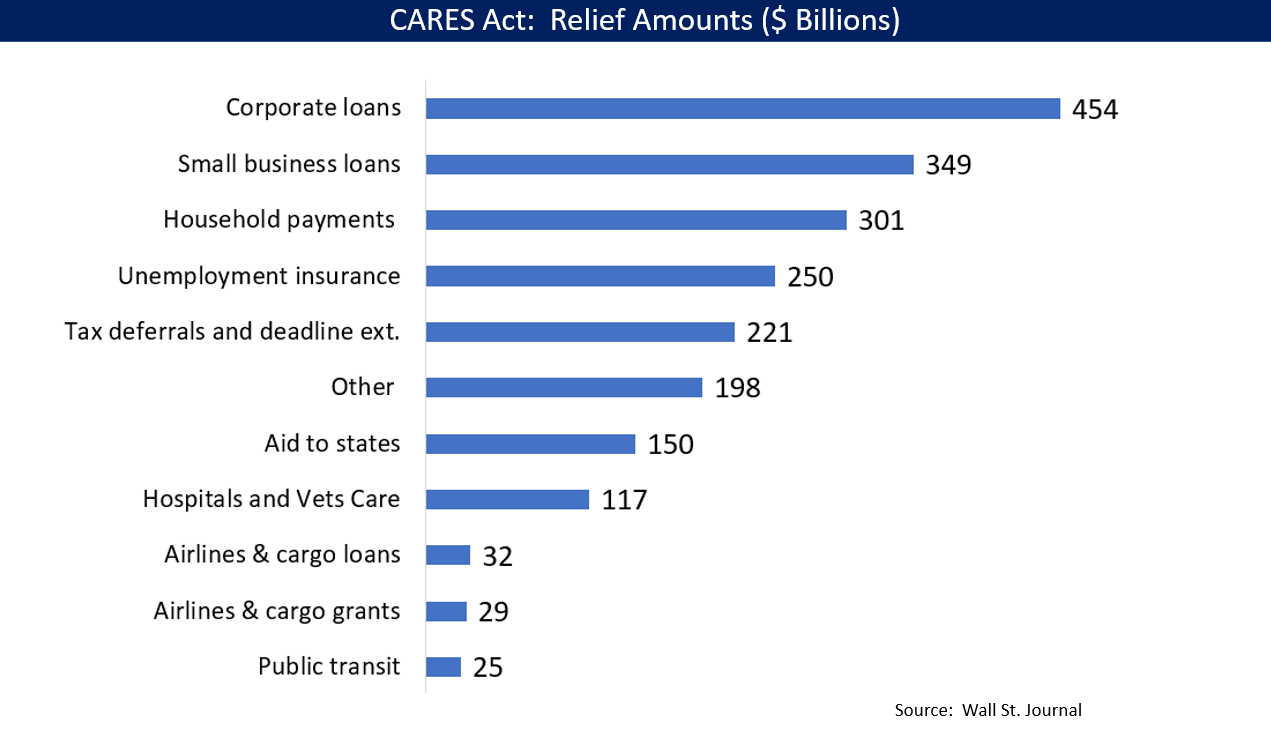
CARES Act relief amounts by category (in billions of dollars), totaling $2.1 trillion

Sankey diagram of CARES Act relief amounts

=== Provisions ===
The Act includes the following provisions:

- Allocates $130 billion to the medical and hospital industries. Also including medical equipment manufacturers.
- Reauthorizes and allocates funding to public health programs.
- Authorizes the Food and Drug Administration to approve rule changes for over-the-counter drugs without full advanced public notice and public comments.
- Requires an examination, report, and recommendations regarding the security of the United States' supply chain of medical products.
- Adds personal protective equipment, medical devices, diagnostic tests, and medical supplies that administer drugs, vaccines, and other biological products to the Strategic National Stockpile.
- Gives legal immunity to manufacturers, distributors, and administrators of respiratory protective devices under federal and state law with respect to all claims for loss caused by the devices.
- Requires the Department of Health and Human Services to prioritize the review of drug applications when there is an emergency drug shortage.
- Requires group health plans, health insurance carriers, and Medicare to cover COVID-19 testing and vaccination.
- Authorizes and appropriates $1.32 billion of grants to community health care centers for the prevention, diagnosis, and treatment of COVID-19.
- Provides $145 million in grants over a five-year period for promoting telehealth.
- Establishes a Ready Reserve Corps of medical professionals in event of a public health emergency or national emergency.
- Limits federal and state liability for unpaid health care volunteers for harm caused to patients relating to the diagnosis, prevention, or treatment of COVID-19.
- Allows the disclosure of de-identified patient medical records related to substance use disorder.
- Allows funding for elder nutrition support to be used for an individual who is unable to obtain food due to social distancing. Waives the usual dietary guidelines requirements during the COVID-19 health emergency.
- Requires the Department of Health and Human Services to carry out a national public awareness campaign about the importance, safety, and need for blood donation.
- Expedites the development and approval process of new veterinary drugs for diseases that have the potential for serious health consequences for humans.
- Increases Medicare payments to medical providers between May 1, 2020, and December 31, 2020.

=== Outcomes ===
- The $175 billion Provider Relief Fund began disbursing funds to healthcare providers in April 2020. Funds do not have to be repaid if the healthcare provider meets specified criteria. An August 2020 Washington Post analysis found that for-profit nursing homes accused of "Medicare fraud and kickbacks, labor violations and widespread failures in patient care" had received hundreds of millions of dollars from this fund.
- The CARES Act allocated $1 billion to the Defense Department to manufacture personal protective equipment (PPE) and other health products under the Defense Production Act (DPA). Defense Department lawyers determined that the money did not have to be used for pandemic-related purposes, and, within weeks, hundreds of millions of dollars had been spent for other military uses.

== Relief to businesses and organizations ==
=== Loans ===
The Act:

- Allocates up to $500 billion to the Exchange Stabilization Fund (ESF) for assistance to eligible businesses, states, and municipalities. A business is eligible if it has significant operations in the United States, a majority of its employees based in the United States, and it either has fewer than 10,000 employees or has less than $2.5 billion of revenue. Each loan is a minimum of $1 million, has a four-year maturity, and restrictions on compensation of highly paid employees. The program is limited to $25 billion for passenger air carriers, $4 billion for air cargo carriers, and $17 billion for businesses critical to maintaining national security.
- Creates a $669 billion small-business loan program called the Paycheck Protection Program (PPP). (Originally $349 billion, the Paycheck Protection Program and Healthcare Enhancement Act added $320 billion.) Funds are made available for loans originated between February 15 and June 30, 2020. Most firms with at most 500 employees are eligible for the PPP funds. There are exceptions for all firms whose North American Industry Classification System (NAICS) code starts with 72, which includes hotels and restaurants. If each location of a business with a NAICS code starting with 72 has at most 500 employees, such a business is also eligible for PPP funds. In addition, a NAICS 72-code-business is eligible for PPP funds if each separate legal entity (even if affiliated through 100% ownership) has at most 500 employees.
- Expands the Small Business Administration's Economic Injury Disaster Loans (EIDL) to cover most nonprofit organizations, including faith-based organizations. An unsecured EIDL can be for up to $25,000, while a secured EIDL may be for up to $2 million. The applicant must have an acceptable credit history and be able to repay the EIDL. Each EIDL has a low interest rate and has a term of up to 30 years. An EIDL applicant may receive a $10,000 advance payment that is not required to be repaid. Proceeds from an EIDL may be used to pay for ordinary and necessary operating expenses, liabilities, and other bills not able to be paid because of a decrease in revenue. An EIDL may not replace lost revenue or lost profits. An EIDL may not be used for business expansion.
- Provides the Secretary of the Treasury with the authority to make loans or loan guarantees to states, municipalities, and eligible businesses.

=== Tax credits, tax deferrals, and tax deductions ===
The Act:

- Allows employers to defer payment of the employers' share of social security tax for up to two years. Payment of the portion of self-employment tax corresponding to the employer's share of social security tax may also be deferred for up to two years. Payment of these taxes incurred after having a Paycheck Protection Program loan forgiven cannot be deferred, but taxes incurred before the loan forgiveness may continue to be deferred.
- Provides a refundable employee retention tax credit for employers whose operations were suspended due to COVID-19 or whose revenue has significantly decreased due to COVID-19. The tax credit is equal to 50% of qualified wages paid between March 13, 2020, and December 31, 2020. Maximum credit is $5,000 per employee. Qualified wages include the cost of qualified health care. Qualified wages do not include wages paid for Emergency Paid Sick Leave or Emergency Family Medical Leave. A business was originally not eligible for the credit if it receives a Paycheck Protection Program loan, although that was later amended by Congress.
- Increases the tax deduction for net operating losses from 80% to 100%, for 2018, 2019, and 2020. Suspends the $500,000 limitation on tax-deductible net operating losses until 2021. Allows net operating losses from 2018, 2019, and 2020 to be carried back to up to five years, resulting in retroactive tax refunds.
- Increases the limit for most tax-deductible charitable contributions from 10% to 25% of income for corporations. Increases the limit for tax-deductions for charitable contributions of food inventory from 15% to 25% of income.

=== Businesses connected to politicians and political donors ===
Businesses owned by the president, senior government officials, and their immediate families are ineligible for funds distributed through the $500 billion Economic Stabilization Fund. A business falls into this category if it is at least 20% owned or controlled by a person in the restricted group. Such businesses may nonetheless still be eligible for funds distributed through the $669 billion Paycheck Protection Program or through the $15 billion change to the tax code.

Jared Kushner's businesses may generally be eligible for relief under the Economic Stabilization Fund because, according to The New York Times, he usually owns less than 20% of his family's real estate projects.

On April 21, the Trump Organization said it would not seek a Small Business Administration federal loan; it was, however, seeking relief from the General Services Administration to which it normally pays rent of about $268,000 per month to operate the Trump International Hotel in a federal building in Washington, D.C. Eric Trump said he hoped the General Services Administration would treat the Trump Organization "the same" as its other tenants.)

Political donors are eligible for loans under the Paycheck Protection Program. As of May 3, the largest beneficiary of relief loans under this program is the hotel group Ashford Hospitality Trust. The company is run by Monty Bennett, who donated over half a million dollars to Republicans in the current election cycle; Bennett received the loans after hiring lobbyist Jeffrey Miller, who fundraised over $1 million for Trump's reelection campaign. The company had applied for $126 million in loans and had already received $76 million when, following criticism, it announced it would return these funds. Other recipients with ties to the Trump administration include Hallador Energy (employed EPA administrator Scott Pruitt as a lobbyist; received $10 million); Flotek Industries (employed ambassador to Germany Richard Grenell as a consultant; received $4.6 million); and MiMedx (their former chief executive Parker H. Petit was Trump's 2016 finance chairman in Georgia; received $10 million).

Clay Lacy Aviation, a California-based private jet charter company that serves business executives and celebrities, received a government grant of nearly $27 million that it does not have to repay. In 2016, the company's founder, Clay Lacy, donated $47,000 to the Republican Party after it officially nominated Trump and also donated the maximum allowable $2,700 directly to the Trump campaign.

== Relief to individuals ==
Some individuals received checks in the mail, while others received direct deposits in their bank accounts. On May 18, the Treasury Department said that future payments may be issued in the form of prepaid Visa debit cards rather than checks.

=== Tax rebates, tax credits, and tax deductions ===
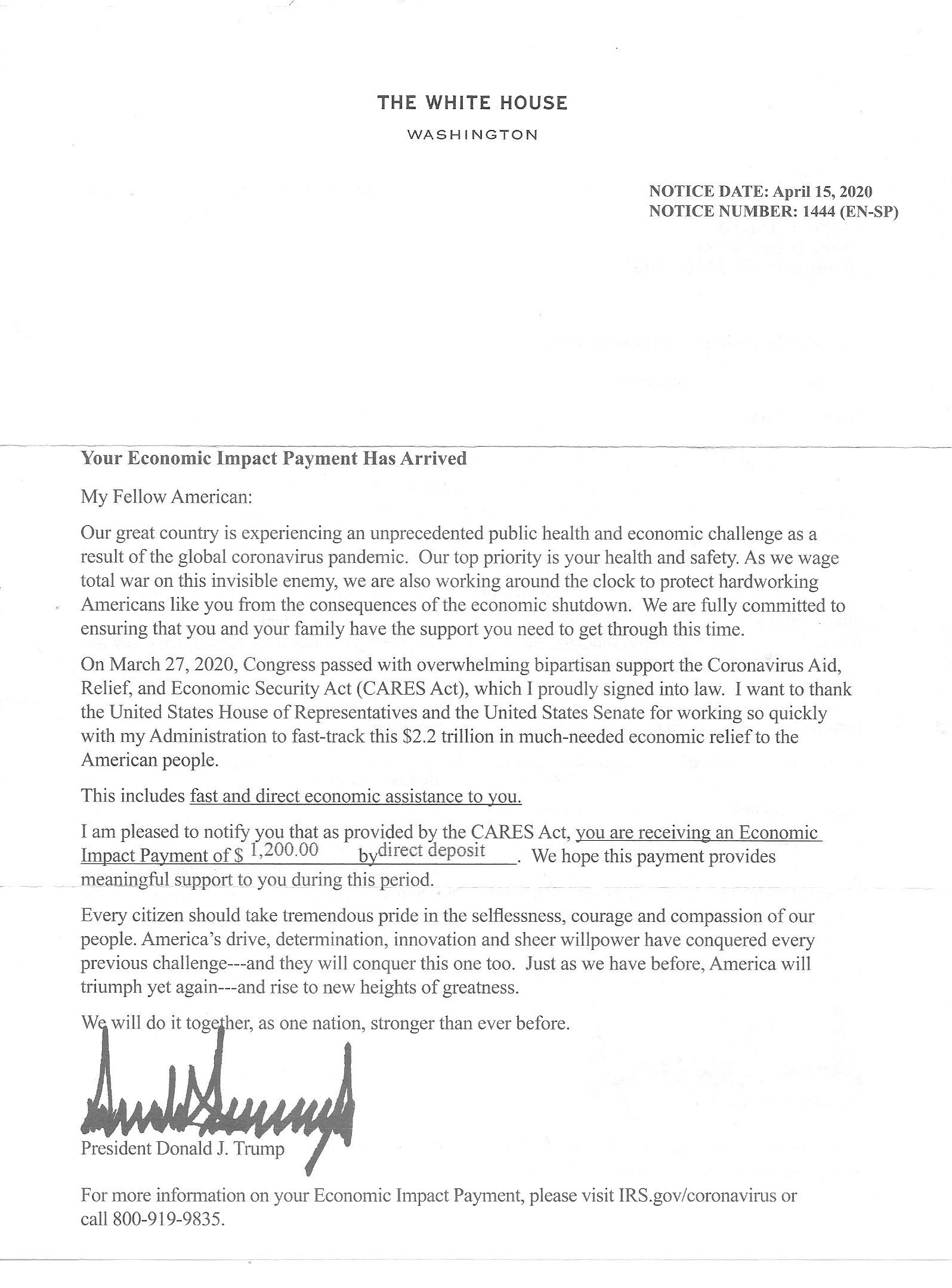
Letter to individuals announcing the issuance of Economic Impact Payments

The Act:

- Provides credits against the 2020 personal income tax for eligible individuals. These advance payments will be sent to people in April 2020. Eligibility for the advance payments will be based on the person's income tax return for 2019, or 2018 if the return for 2019 has not been filed yet. Individuals who are not required to file an income tax return but are eligible for the advance payment may register through the Internal Revenue Service's web site. Eligible individuals who receive social security benefit payments will generally receive payments without registering. Contrary to common misconception, the payments are not considered taxable income.
  - $2,400 to each married couple filing jointly or $1,200 to each other individual, and
  - $500 for each dependent who is a qualifying child under age 17 as of December 31, 2020.
  - Payment amounts are reduced for each married couple filing jointly whose adjusted gross income is between $150,001 and $198,000. Payments are reduced for a head of household whose adjusted gross income is between $112,501 and $146,500. Payments are reduced for each other individual whose adjusted gross income is between $75,001 and $99,000.
  - An individual is not eligible if he can be claimed as a dependent by another taxpayer. An individual is also not eligible if he is a nonresident alien.
- Allows individuals who take the standard deduction to take a tax deduction for up to $300 of cash charitable contributions per year, effective January 1, 2020.
- Increases the limit for most tax-deductible charitable contributions of cash from 60% to 100% of adjusted gross income for individuals.
- Temporarily suspends the limit that losses from pass-through entities can reduce taxes on the owner's non-business income. (Note: According to Forbes, this provision granted around 43,000 taxpayers who make more than $1 million a year each a windfall gain averaging $1.7 million.)

=== Unemployment benefits ===
- Establishes:
  - Federal Pandemic Unemployment Compensation (FPUC), an additional $600 per week for those receiving unemployment benefits, in addition to the amount allotted by the specific state. The additional amount was available from the date the CARES Act was enacted (March 27, 2020) through July 26, 2020.
  - Pandemic Emergency Unemployment Compensation (PEUC), an additional 13 weeks for those who have otherwise exhausted unemployment benefits.
  - Pandemic Unemployment Assistance (PUA), a type of unemployment insurance with broader eligibility guidelines, including any individual who is out of work due to the pandemic, including formerly self-employed, contract, and gig workers.
- Provides reimbursements to self-insured nonprofit organizations, government agencies, and Indian tribes for 50 percent of unemployment benefit payments paid to states, through December 31, 2020.

=== Student grants, student loans, and work-study programs ===
- Creates a 14-billion-dollar Elementary and Secondary School Emergency Relief Fund (ESSER) to provide cash grants to college students for costs such as course materials, technology, food, housing, and child care. Each college will determine which of its students receive cash grants. This was divided into three pieces: $12.5 billion in formula funds, at least half of which must be given directly to students, $1 billion for institutions serving minorities, and $350 million in supplemental funds for small institutions with unmet needs. Though the Department of Education issued guidance that international and undocumented students are ineligible for these funds, this was challenged in a lawsuit.
- Payments of student loan principal and interest of by an employer to either an employee or a lender is not taxable to the employee if paid between March 27, 2020, and December 31, 2020. The maximum amount that is tax-free is $5,250 per employee.
- For college students in a Federal Work-Study Program, allows a school to continue to pay a student if the student is unable to fulfill their work-study obligation due to the COVID-19 public health emergency.
- Gives students and colleges flexibility regarding the requirements for federal student financial aid during the COVID-19 pandemic.
- Suspends payments and accrual of interest on federal student loans through September 30, 2020. Suspends garnishments and tax refund interception related to federal student loans through September 30, 2020.

=== Retirement plans and retirement accounts ===
- Suspends required minimum distributions from traditional individual retirement accounts (IRAs) and employer-sponsored retirement plans for 2020.
- Waives the 10% tax penalty for early distributions from IRAs, 401(k) plans, 403(b) plans, and 457(b) plans if:
  - The individual, their spouse, or their dependent has been diagnosed with COVID-19;
  - The individual experienced adverse financial consequences because they were quarantined, furloughed, or laid off, or because their employer reduced their working hours; or
  - The individual experienced adverse financial consequences because the individual is unable to work due to lack of child care.
  - A plan administrator is allowed to rely on the participant's assertion that one of these events occurred.
  - Distributions are still subject to income taxes, although the individual may choose to spread the payment of the income taxes over three years, rather than paying them all in one year. Alternatively, if the distributed amount is repaid into any (Sec 2202(a)(3)(A & B)) IRA or employer-sponsored retirement plan within three years of receiving the early distribution, no income taxes will be due.
- Increases the maximum amount of a 401(k) loan from an employer-sponsored 401(k) retirement plan. The limit used to be the lesser of $50,000 or 50% of the participant's vested assets. It has been changed to the lesser of $100,000 or 100% of the participant's vested assets.
- Allows up to a one-year delay in repayments of outstanding retirement plan loans that are due between March 27, 2020, and December 31, 2020. Afterwards, the loan's amortization schedule should be revised to reflect the delay and the interest accrued during that period.
- All changes to the rules regarding loans and early distributions are at the option of the plan administrator and are not required to be adopted.

=== Medicare ===
- Expands telehealth services in Medicare. Waives the requirement that covered medical services include an in-person meeting with a medical professional.
- Requires Medicare prescription drug benefit plans and Medicare Advantage plans with prescription drug benefits to allow fills and refills of 90-day supplies of prescription drugs during the COVID-19 pandemic.

=== Foreclosure and eviction moratorium ===
- Sections 4022 and 4023 deal with mortgages, protecting those with federally-backed mortgages from foreclosure until at least August 31, 2020, and allowing the right to request a mortgage forbearance for up to 180 days. Section 4024(b) provides for a 120-day moratorium (beginning on the day the Act was signed, March 27, and lasting until July 24) on eviction filings for rental units in properties that participate in federal assistance programs, or have a federally backed mortgage or multifamily mortgage loan. One estimate is that this eviction moratorium covers 28% of all rental units in the United States; however, there are no enforcement mechanisms provided.

=== Other provisions ===
- Allows health savings accounts (HSAs), health flexible spending accounts, health reimbursement accounts, and medical savings accounts to pay for or reimburse for over-the-counter medicines and menstrual care products without a prescription or note from a physician, as of January 1, 2020.
- When an individual affected by COVID-19 requests and receives flexibility with their payment obligations from a creditor, the creditor must report to credit bureaus that the individual is in compliance with their payment obligations.
- Emergency Broadband Benefit was a United States FCC program which subsidizes broadband access during the COVID-19 pandemic. The EBB was replaced in 2021 by the Affordable Connectivity Program.

Other pieces of legislation established an Emergency Rental Assistance (ERA) program. The Consolidated Appropriations Act, 2021 (Division N of P.L. 116-260) set aside $25 billion, while Section 3201 of the American Rescue Plan Act (P.L. 117-2) set aside an additional $21.5 billion. These were to be funded by the Coronavirus Relief Fund (CRF) established by the CARES Act.

== Relief to defense contractors ==
- Department of Defense contractors may use their federal contracts to pay their employees and subcontractors up to 40 hours per week per worker while the worker can neither work on-site nor work remotely on a contract beginning January 31, 2020, through September 30, 2020.

== Relief to mail delivery ==
- The U.S. Postal Service received a $10 billion line of credit. On April 24, 2020, Trump attempted to use this loan as leverage for a new demand, as he threatened to block the emergency funding if the post office did not quadruple its prices for online retailers. As of May 2020, the details of the loan were still being negotiated.
- $400 million was allocated to help states prepare for an expected increase in mailed ballots in November 2020.

== Legislative history ==
=== Initial criticism and negotiations ===
The House initially passed a tax cut bill in mid-2019 and sent it to the Senate, which then used it as a shell bill and added an amendment in the nature of a substitute, fulfilling the constitutional requirement that all bills for raising revenue must originate in the House. After the new bill was released by the Senate, Speaker of the House Nancy Pelosi (D-CA) issued a statement that read in part: "We are beginning to review Senator McConnell's proposal and on first reading, it is not at all pro-worker and instead puts corporations way ahead of workers." Senate Minority Leader Chuck Schumer (D-NY) criticized the fact that Democrats were not involved by Republicans in drafting the bill.

Among Senate Republicans there was "significant debate and disagreement" regarding "Donald Trump's proposal to provide most Americans with $1,000-plus checks to boost spending and stimulate the economy". Senator Richard Shelby (R-AL), the Republican chair of the Senate Appropriations Committee, stated "I personally think that if we're going to help people we should direct the cash payments maybe as a supplement to unemployment, not to the people who are working every day, just a blank check to everybody in America making up to $75,000."

=== Early procedural votes ===
On the evening of Sunday, March 22, 2020, Senate Democrats blocked the bill in a key procedural vote; the vote was 47–47, while 60 votes were needed to proceed. Immediately thereafter, "Dow futures hit their 5% 'limit down' overnight, and were off 600 points at one stage Monday morning."

In response, Mitch McConnell announced the second key procedural vote on the CARES Act, a cloture vote to end debate, on Monday, March 23; 60 votes were needed, but it failed 49–46. Both procedural votes were on a "shell" bill framed to repeal an Obamacare tax which passed the House on July 17, 2019. For procedural reasons, the text was replaced by the new language passed by the Senate.

Procedural votes for the bill were made more difficult by the fact that five Republican Senators were in self-quarantine: Senator Rand Paul, who had tested positive for COVID-19, as well as Senators Mike Lee, Mitt Romney, Cory Gardner, and Rick Scott.

Nancy Pelosi indicated that the House would prepare its own bill, expected to exceed $2.5 trillion, as a counter-offer, which was criticized by Republicans as "a progressive wishlist seemingly unrelated to the crisis".

=== Senate agreement ===
Early in the morning of Wednesday March 25, Senate leaders announced they had come to an agreement on a modified version of the CARES Act, the full text of which exceeds 300 pages. Mitch McConnell "announced news of a breakthrough on the Senate floor shortly after 1:30 a.m. Wednesday".

Senator McConnell said on the floor, "[we have] reached a bipartisan agreement on a historic relief package for this pandemic ... this is a wartime level of investment for our nation." McConnell continued the analogy to war by saying the CARES Act would provide "ammunition" to health care workers who are the "frontline heroes who put themselves at risk to care for patients" by providing them "the ammunition they need". Chuck Schumer stated on the Senate floor, "Like all compromises, this bill is far from perfect, but we believe the legislation has been improved significantly to warrant its quick consideration and passage, and because many Democrats and Republicans were willing to do the serious and hard work, the bill is much better off than where it started."

CARES Act as negotiated by the Senate

The result of the agreement between Senate leaders and the White House was a $2 trillion bill that "is the largest economic relief bill in U.S. history". The bill was criticized by Representative Alexandria Ocasio-Cortez and New York Governor Andrew Cuomo. Republican Senators Lindsey Graham, Tim Scott, Ben Sasse, and Rick Scott expressed concern the bill's strong unemployment provisions "encourage employees to be laid off instead of working". Senator Bernie Sanders then threatened to block the legislation and impose more stringent conditions for the $500 billion earmarked for corporate bailouts if the unemployment provision was removed by the proposed amendment of the four Republican Senators. To address these concerns, Senate leaders "agreed to allow an amendment vote on the floor". The Republican-led amendment to cap unemployment benefits failed in a 48–48 vote.

Late in the night of March 25, 2020, the Senate passed the $2 trillion bill in a unanimous 96–0 vote. Four Republicans did not vote, namely John Thune, who was "feeling ill", Rand Paul (who had tested positive for COVID-19), and Mitt Romney and Mike Lee, who were both in isolation after having had contact with Senator Paul.

=== House vote ===
On March 25, Pelosi said that "many of the provisions in there have been greatly improved because of negotiation," and hoped to pass the bill by unanimous consent.

Representative Thomas Massie, a Republican from Kentucky, attempted to maneuver for a roll-call vote, but the quorum present did not support the idea. Massie's threat to demand a recorded vote nonetheless "compelled dozens, if not hundreds, of lawmakers to return to Capitol Hill from their home districts, navigating across interstates and through airports at a time when public health officials have urged Americans to avoid nonessential travel and gathering in large groups". Massie's actions received bipartisan criticism. Former Secretary of State John Kerry, a Democrat, tweeted "Congressman Massie has tested positive for being an asshole. He must be quarantined to prevent the spread of his massive stupidity," a message which was shared by Donald Trump on Twitter. Republican Representative Peter T. King called Massie's actions "disgraceful" and "irresponsible". Despite the criticism Massie continued to defend his actions, claiming that the act was full of pork barrel spending and that very little of the total money would actually go to citizens. The House passed the bill on March 27 by a near-unanimous, unrecorded voice vote.

=== Signed into law and signing statement ===
CARES Act as signed into law

A few hours after the House passed the bill, it was signed into law by President Trump.

In a signing statement, Trump suggested he could gag the Special Inspector General for Pandemic Recovery (SIGPR) insofar as his constitutional powers as president enabled him to block the SIGPR's reports to Congress. According to The New York Times, the statement was consistent with Trump's "history of trying to keep damaging information acquired by an inspector general from reaching Congress".

== Litigation ==
Part of the CARES act set aside $8 billion to federally-recognized "tribal governments". The Treasury Department earmarked about $500 million of those funds to go towards Alaska Native corporations (ANCs), which provided similar governance as typical tribal leadership in the lower 48 states. Three native Indian tribes sued on the basis that under the Indian Self-Determination and Education Assistance Act of 1975 (ISDA), ANCs were not federally-recognized tribal governments and should not be eligible for CARES funds. The case was eventually heard by the United States Supreme Court, which ruled in June 2021 that ANCs did qualify as tribal governments under the ISDA, and thus eligible to receive the set-aside funds.

== Oversight mechanisms ==
=== Pandemic Response Accountability Committee ===
The legislation required the creation of a Pandemic Response Accountability Committee. On March 30, the inspectors general selected Glenn Fine, who had been an inspector general in four presidential administrations and who was serving as acting Pentagon inspector general, to chair the committee. One week later, Trump removed Fine from his position as acting Pentagon inspector general, making him ineligible to chair the committee. Michael E. Horowitz instead became the acting chair.

By late April, there were at least four investigations into the government's response to the pandemic; on April 28, some inspectors general from the Pandemic Response Accountability Committee updated the House Oversight Committee about these investigations.

=== Special Inspector General for Pandemic Recovery ===
The legislation also requires oversight by a separate Special Inspector General for Pandemic Recovery (SIGPR) who will monitor loans and investments from a $500 billion corporate bailout fund established by the legislation. A provision in the legislation empowers the special inspector general to audit the use of the fund; requires the Treasury Department and other executive-branch entities to provide information to the special inspector general; and directs the special inspector general to report to Congress "without delay" if an agency unreasonably withholds requested information. The Pandemic Response Accountability Committee will coordinate the work of the SIGPR.

Amidst reports that Trump would nominate White House lawyer Brian Miller for this job, Montana Senator Jon Tester and Utah Senator Mitt Romney drafted a letter to the president requesting a different, independent Special Inspector General. Miller was confirmed by the Senate on June 2.

== Budgetary impact ==
The Congressional Budget Office provided a preliminary score for the CARES Act on April 16, 2020, estimating that it would increase federal deficits by about $1.7 trillion over the 2020–2030 period. The estimate includes:

- A $988 billion increase in mandatory outlays;
- A $446 billion decrease in revenues; and
- A $326 billion increase in discretionary outlays, stemming from emergency supplemental appropriations.

CBO reported that not all parts of the bill will increase deficits. "Although the act provides financial assistance totaling more than $2 trillion, the projected cost is less than that because some of that assistance is in the form of loan guarantees, which are not estimated to have a net effect on the budget. In particular, the act authorizes the Secretary of the Treasury to provide up to $454 billion to fund emergency lending facilities established by the Board of Governors of the Federal Reserve System. Because the income and costs stemming from that lending are expected to roughly offset each other, CBO estimates no deficit effect from that provision." On November 19, 2020, Treasury Secretary Mnuchin sent a letter to the Federal Reserve requesting that the Federal Reserve return unused funds to the Treasury.

=== Invalid and challenged stimulus payments ===
After the enactment of the CARES Act, the Treasury Department and Internal Revenue Service (IRS) disbursed about 160.4 million payments totaling $269 billion by the end of April 2020, of which nearly 1.1 million payments, totaling almost $1.4 billion (0.5% of the total value of all payments), were sent to dead people. A Government Accountability Office report in June 2020 noted that, in the hurry to distribute payments, the agencies had not followed post-2013 financial control safeguards to prevent payments to the dead or other ineligible persons. The report added that "agencies have made only limited progress so far in achieving transparency and accountability goals."

The IRS put a notice on their website that incarcerated individuals did not qualify and withheld or retrieved payments from many prisoners. On September 24, 2020, a U.S. District Court issued an order certifying a nationwide class of incarcerated individuals. The court also granted a preliminary injunction requiring the IRS and Treasury Department to stop withholding checks solely on the basis of their incarceration status, resulting in payment of $100M (0.04% of the total value of all payments).

Some citizens of other countries were accidentally given checks on the basis of having previously worked or lived in the U.S.

== Commentary ==
=== Bipartisan passage ===
Congress passed the CARES Act relatively quickly and with unanimity from both parties despite its $2.2 trillion price tag, indicating the severity of the global pandemic and the need for emergency spending, as viewed by lawmakers. Writing in The New Republic, journalist Alex Shephard nevertheless questioned how the Republican Party "... had come to embrace big spending" when, during the Great Recession, no Republicans in the House and only three in the Senate supported President Barack Obama's $800 billion stimulus, known as the American Recovery and Reinvestment Act of 2009 (ARRA), often citing the deficit and national debt. Shephard opined that, unlike CARES, much of the media attention to ARRA focused on its impact on the deficit, and he questioned whether Republicans would again support a major spending request under a hypothetical future Democratic president.

Donald Trump remarked upon passage of CARES in the Senate that "The Democrats have treated us fairly ... I really believe we've had a very good back-and-forth. And I say that with respect to [Senate Minority Leader] Chuck Schumer".

=== Economic impact ===
In mid-April, a survey released by the James Beard Foundation and the Independent Restaurant Coalition indicated that 80 percent of restaurant owners (representing roughly half a million businesses which employ eleven million people) did not believe that their businesses were likely to survive, despite the CARES Act and the PPP. Advisors nominated by the White House to their Great American Economic Revival Industry Group for the food industry included 23 celebrities and executives of large chains, but no small business owners.

In a release dated April 16, 2020, the Congressional Budget Office estimated that the CARES Act "will increase federal deficits by about $1.7 trillion over the 2020–2030 period." Part of the reason this is less than the $2.2 trillion included in the CARES Act is that income and costs as part of the Treasury's emergency lending program are expected to offset each other.

Following the passage of the CARES act, real disposable personal income jumped to over 17,200 billion of chained 2012 dollars from a previous 15,200 billion of chained 2012 dollars in January.

=== Political impacts ===
The passage of the CARES act occurred during the 2020 election cycle. Steven Mnuchin, the Treasury Secretary, insisted to the IRS that the checks to individuals include Trump's name, the first time a president's name appeared on an IRS expenditure. IRS officials believed the White House was politicizing the agency to boost Trump's reelection bid. The officials also worried that it would be in violation of the 1939 Hatch Act, among other federal laws, seeking a legal opinion from the Treasury Department and guidance from the Justice Department. The request was approved by agency attorneys. The request to add Trump's name and a letter from the White House stood to delay the mailing (due to reprinting), and triggered public criticism, but the checks were sent on time.

== See also ==
- Operation Warp Speed
- Financial impact of the COVID-19 pandemic
- Coronavirus Preparedness and Response Supplemental Appropriations Act
- Families First Coronavirus Response Act
- HEALS Act
- Paycheck Protection Program
- Paycheck Protection Program and Health Care Enhancement Act
- Great American Economic Revival Industry Groups
- List of acts of the 116th United States Congress
- 2020 in United States politics and government
- 2020s in United States political history
- Health and Economic Recovery Omnibus Emergency Solutions Act
- Consolidated Appropriations Act, 2021
- American Rescue Plan
- COVID-19 and homelessness
