= List of United States federal legislation, 1789–1901 =

This is a chronological, but incomplete, list of United States federal legislation passed by the 1st through 56th United States Congresses, between 1789 and 1901. For the main article on this subject, see List of United States federal legislation. Additional lists can be found at List of United States federal legislation: Congress of the Confederation, List of United States federal legislation, 1901–2001 and List of United States federal legislation, 2001–present.

== 1st United States Congress ==
=== First Session (March 4, 1789–September 29, 1789) ===
Public Laws
	Date	Subject Matter	Title	Chapter	Legal Citation (link to full text)
1	June 1, 1789	Oaths of Office.	An act to regulate the time and manner of administering certain oaths,	Sess. 1, ch. 1	1 Stat. 23
2	July 4, 1789	Duties on Merchandise imported into the United States.	An Act for laying a Duty on Goods, Wares, and Merchandises imported into the United States. (Tariff of 1789)	Sess. 1, ch. 2	1 Stat. 24
3	July 20, 1789	Duties on Tonnage.	An Act imposing Duties on Tonnage.	Sess. 1, ch. 3	1 Stat. 27
4	July 27, 1789	Department of Foreign Affairs.	An Act for establishing an Executive Department, to be denominated the Department of Foreign Affairs.	Sess. 1, ch. 4	1 Stat. 28
5	July 31, 1789	Regulation of the Collection of Duties on Tonnage and on Merchandise.	An Act to regulate the Collection of the Duties imposed by law on the tonnage of ships or vessels, and on goods, wares and merchandises imported into the United States.	Sess. 1, ch. 5	1 Stat. 29
6	August 5, 1789	Settlement of accounts between the United States and the individual States.	An Act for settling the Accounts between the United States and individual States.	Sess. 1, ch. 6	1 Stat. 49 (chapter 6)
7	August 7, 1789	Establishment of the Department of War.	An Act to establish an Executive Department, to be denominated the Department of War.	Sess. 1, ch. 7	1 Stat. 49 (chapter 7)
8	August 7, 1789	Government of the North-West Territory provided for.	An Act to provide for the Government of the Territory North-west of the river Ohio.	Sess. 1, ch. 8	1 Stat. 50
9	August 7, 1789	Light-houses, Beacons, Buoys, &c.	An Act for the establishment and support of Lighthouses, Beacons, Buoys, and Public Piers.	Sess. 1, ch. 9	1 Stat. 53
10	August 20, 1789	Expenses of Treaties with the Indians, and appointment of Commissioners to manage the same.	An Act providing for the Expenses which may attend negotiations or Treaties with the Indian Tribes, and the appointment of Commissioners for managing the same.	Sess. 1, ch. 10	1 Stat. 54
11	September 1, 1789	Registering and clearing of Vessels in the Coasting Trade, and regulating the Coasting Trade, &c.	An Act for Registering and Clearing Vessels, Regulating the Coasting Trade, and for other purposes.	Sess. 1, ch. 11	1 Stat. 55
12	September 2, 1789	Establishment of the Treasury Department.	An Act to establish the Treasury Department.	Sess. 1, ch. 12	1 Stat. 65
13	September 11, 1789	Salaries to Executive Officers with their Assistants.	An act for establishing the salaries of the executive officers of government, with their assistants and clerks.	Sess. 1, ch. 13	1 Stat. 67
14	September 15, 1789	Safe keeping of the Records and Seal of the United States.	An Act to provide for the safe-keeping of the Acts, Records and Seal of the United States, and for other purposes. (Records Act)	Sess. 1, ch. 14	1 Stat. 68
15	September 16, 1789	Act for the Collection of Duties on Tonnage suspended in part, &c.	An Act to suspend part of an Act, intituled “An Act to regulate the collection of the Duties imposed by Law on the Tonnage of Ships or Vessels, and on Goods, Wares, and Merchandises, imported into the United States,” and for other purposes.	Sess. 1, ch. 15	1 Stat. 69
16	September 22, 1789	Temporary Establishment of the Post-office.	An Act for the temporary establishment of the Post-Office.	Sess. 1, ch. 16	1 Stat. 70 (chapter 16)
17	September 22, 1789	Compensation to Members of Congress and to the Officers of both Houses.	An Act for allowing Compensation to the Members of the Senate and House of Representatives of the United States, and to the Officers of both Houses.	Sess. 1, ch. 17	1 Stat. 70 (chapter 17)
18	September 23, 1789	Compensation to the Judges of the Courts of the United States and to the Attorney-General.	An Act for allowing certain Compensation to the Judges of the Supreme and other Courts, and to the Attorney General of the United States.	Sess. 1, ch. 18	1 Stat. 72 (chapter 18)
19	September 24, 1789	Compensation to the President and vice-president of the United States.	An Act for allowing a Compensation to the President and Vice President of the United States.	Sess. 1, ch. 19	1 Stat. 72 (chapter 19)
20	September 24, 1789	Establishment of the Judicial Courts of the United States.	An Act to establish the Judicial Courts of the United States. (Judiciary Act of 1789)	Sess. 1, ch. 20	1 Stat. 73
21	September 29, 1789	Regulation of Process in the Courts of the United States.	An Act to regulate Processes in the Courts of the United States.	Sess. 1, ch. 21	1 Stat. 93
22	September 29, 1789	Act for the Registering and Clearing Vessels, and Regulating the Coasting Trade, explained and amended.	An Act to explain and amend an Act, intituled “An Act for registering and clearing Vessels, regulating the Coasting Trade, and for other purposes.”	Sess. 1, ch. 22	1 Stat. 94
23	September 29, 1789	Appropriations for the Support of Government.	An Act making Appropriation for the Service of the present year.	Sess. 1, ch. 23	1 Stat. 95 (chapter 23)
24	September 29, 1789	Invalid Pensioners.	An Act providing for the payment of the Invalid Pensioners of the United States.	Sess. 1, ch. 24	1 Stat. 95 (chapter 24)
25	September 29, 1789	Establishment of the Troops of the United States recognised and adapted to the Constitution.	An Act to recognize and adopt to the Constitution of the United States the establishment of the Troops raised under the Resolves of the United States in Congress assembled, and for other purposes therein mentioned.	Sess. 1, ch. 25	1 Stat. 95 (chapter 25)
26	September 29, 1789	Meeting of Congress.	An Act to alter the time for the next Meeting of Congress.	Sess. 1, ch. 27	1 Stat. 96

=== Second Session (January 4, 1790—August 12, 1790) ===
Public Laws
	Date	Subject Matter	Title	Chapter	Legal Citation (link to full text)
1	February 8, 1790	Laws of the United States, giving effect to, in North Carolina.	An Act for giving effect to the several acts therein mentioned, in respect to the state of North Carolina, and for other purposes.	Sess. 2, ch. 1	1 Stat. 99
2	March 1, 1790	Census of 1790.	An Act providing for the enumeration of the Inhabitants of the United States. (Census of 1790)	Sess. 2, ch. 2	1 Stat. 101
3	March 26, 1790	Naturalization.	An Act to establish an uniform Rule of Naturalization. (Naturalization Act of 1790)	Sess. 2, ch. 3	1 Stat. 103
4	March 26, 1790	Appropriations for the Support of Government.	An Act making appropriations for the support of government for the year one thousand seven hundred and ninety.	Sess. 2, ch. 4	1 Stat. 104
5	April 2, 1790	Preventing Exportation of Goods not duly inspected according to the Laws of the several States.	An Act to prevent the exportation of goods and not duly inspected according to the laws of the several States.	Sess. 2, ch. 5	1 Stat. 106 (chapter 5)
6	April 2, 1790	Cession by North Carolina of a District in the Western Territory accepted.	An Act to accept a cession of the claims of the state of North Carolina to a certain district of Western Territory.	Sess. 2, ch. 6	1 Stat. 106 (chapter 6)
7	April 10, 1790	Patents for Useful Inventions.	An Act to promote the progress of useful Arts. (Patent Act of 1790)	Sess. 2, ch. 7	1 Stat. 109
8	April 15, 1790	The Act to regulate the Collection of Duties on Tonnage and on Merchandise suspended and amended.	An Act further to suspend part of an act intituled “An act to regulate the collection of the duties imposed by law on tonnage of ships or vessels, and on goods, wares and merchandises imported into the United States.”	Sess. 2, ch. 8	1 Stat. 112 (chapter 8)
9	April 30, 1790	Punishment of Crimes.	An Act for the punishment of certain Crimes against the United States. (Crimes Act of 1790)	Sess. 2, ch. 9	1 Stat. 112 (chapter 9)
10	April 30, 1790	Regulating the Army of the United States.	An Act for regulating the Military Establishment of the United States.	Sess. 2, ch. 10	1 Stat. 119
11	May 26, 1790	Authentication of the Acts and Judicial Proceedings of the States.	An Act to prescribe the mode in which the public Acts, Records, and judicial Proceedings in each State, shall be authenticated so as to take effect in every other State.	Sess. 2, ch. 11	1 Stat. 122 (chapter 11)
12	May 26, 1790	Mitigation of Fines and Forfeitures under the Revenue Laws in certain Cases.	An Act to provide for mitigating or remitting the forfeitures and penalties accruing under the revenue laws, in certain cases therein mentioned.	Sess. 2, ch. 12	1 Stat. 122 (chapter 12)
13	May 26, 1790	Process in the Courts of the United States.	An Act to continue in force an act passed at the last session of Congress, entitled “An act to regulate processes in the Courts of the United States.”	Sess. 2, ch. 13	1 Stat. 123 (chapter 13)
14	May 26, 1790	Government of the Territory south-west of the river Ohio.	An Act for the Government of the Territory of the United States, south of the river Ohio. (Southwest Ordinance)	Sess. 2, ch. 14	1 Stat. 123 (chapter 14)
15	May 31, 1790	Copyright of Books, &c.	An Act for the encouragement of learning, by securing the copies of maps, charts, and books, to the authors and proprietors of such copies, during the times therein mentioned. (Copyright Act of 1790)	Sess. 2, ch. 15	1 Stat. 124
16	June 4, 1790	Courts of the United States in North Carolina.	An Act for giving effect to an Act entituled “An Act to establish the Judicial Courts of the United States,” within the State of North Carolina.	Sess. 2., ch. 17	1 Stat. 126 (chapter 17)
17	June 4, 1790	Salaries of Executive Officers of the Government with their assistants.	An Act supplemental to the Act for establishing the Salaries of the Executive Officers of Government, with their assistants and Clerks.	Sess. 2, ch. 18	1 Stat. 126 (chapter 18)
18	June 14, 1790	Laws of the United States extended to Rhode Island and Providence Plantations.	An Act for giving effect to the several Acts therein mentioned, in respect to the State of Rhode Island and Providence Plantations.	Sess. 2, ch. 19	1 Stat. 126 (chapter 19)
19	June 23, 1790	Judicial Courts of the United States in Rhode Island and Providence Plantations.	An act for giving effect to an act intituled “An act to establish the Judicial Courts of the United States,” within the State of Rhode Island and Providence Plantations.	Sess. 2, ch. 21	1 Stat. 128 (chapter 21)
20	July 1, 1790	Intercourse of the United States and Foreign Nations.	An Act providing the means of intercourse between the United States and foreign nations.	Sess. 2, ch. 22	1 Stat. 128 (chapter 22)
21	July 5, 1790	The Act for the Census of 1790 extended to Rhode Island and Providence Plantations.	An Act giving effect to an act intituled “An act providing for the enumeration of the Inhabitants of the United States,” in respect to the state of Rhode Island and Providence Plantations.	Sess. 2, ch. 25	1 Stat. 129 (chapter 25)
22	July 5, 1790	Purchase of a Tract of Land at West Point.	An Act to authorize the purchase of a tract of land for the use of the United States.	Sess. 2, ch. 26	1 Stat. 129 (chapter 26)
23	July 16, 1790	Invalid Pensions.	An Act further to provide for the Payment of the Invalid Pensioners of the United States.	Sess. 2, ch. 27	1 Stat. 129 (chapter 27)
24	July 16, 1790	Temporary and permanent Seat of Government established.	An Act for establishing the temporary and permanent seat of the Government of the United States. (Residence Act)	Sess. 2, ch. 28	1 Stat. 130
25	July 20, 1790	Government and Regulation of Seamen in the Merchant Service.	An Act for the government and regulation of Seamen in the merchants service.	Sess. 2, ch. 29	1 Stat. 131
26	July 20, 1790	Duties on the Tonnage of Ships and Vessels.	An Act imposing duties on tonnage of ships or vessels.	Sess. 2, ch. 30	1 Stat. 135
27	July 22, 1790	Treaties with the Indians to establish Peace.	An Act to provide for holding a Treaty or Treaties to establish Peace with certain Indian tribes.	Sess. 2, ch. 31	1 Stat. 136
28	July 22, 1790	Light-houses, Beacons, Buoys, &c.	An Act to amend the act for the establishment and support of Lighthouses, beacons, buoys, and public piers.	Sess. 2, ch. 32	1 Stat. 137 (chapter 32)
29	July 22, 1790	Regulation of Trade and Intercourse with the Indian Tribes.	An Act to regulate trade and intercourse with the Indian tribes. (Indian Intercourse Act of 1790)	Sess. 2, ch. 33	1 Stat. 137 (chapter 33)
30	August 4, 1790	Debt of the United States.	An Act making provision for the [payment of the] Debt of the United States. (Funding Act of 1790)	Sess. 2, ch. 34	1 Stat. 138
31	August 4, 1790	Collection of Duties on Merchandise and on Tonnage.	An Act to provide more effectually for the collection of the duties imposed by law on goods, wares and merchandise imported into the United States, and on the tonnage of ships or vessels.	Sess. 2, ch. 35	1 Stat. 145
32	August 4, 1790	Post-Office.	An Act to continue in force for a limited time, an act intituled “An act for the temporary establishment of the Post-Office.”	Sess. 2, ch. 36	1 Stat. 178 (chapter 36)
33	August 5, 1790	Settlement of Accounts between the United States and the individual States.	An Act to provide more effectually for the settlement of the Accounts between the United States and the individual States.	Sess. 2, ch. 38	1 Stat. 178 (chapter 38)
34	August 10, 1790	Debt of the United States, Duties on Merchandise, &c..	An Act making further provision for the payment of the debts of the United States.	Sess. 2, ch. 39	1 Stat. 180
35	August 10, 1790	Virginia Military Lands north-west of the river Ohio.	An Act to enable the Officers and Soldiers of the Virginia Line on continental Establishment, to obtain Titles to certain Lands lying northwest of the River Ohio, between the Little Miami and the Sciota.	Sess. 2, ch. 40	1 Stat. 182
36	August 10, 1790	Light-houses on Portland-Head.	An Act authorizing the Secretary of the Treasury to finish the Lighthouse on Portland Head, in the District of Maine.	Sess. 2, ch. 41	1 Stat. 184 (chapter 41)
37	August 11, 1790	Circuit Courts in South Carolina and Georgia, and District Court of Pennsylvania.	An Act to alter the Times for holding the Circuit Courts of the United States in the Districts of South Carolina and Georgia, and providing that the District Court of Pennsylvania shall in future be held at the city of Philadelphia only.	Sess. 2, ch. 42	1 Stat. 184 (chapter 42)
38	August 11, 1790	Assent of Congress to Acts of Maryland, Georgia, and Rhode Island.	An Act declaring the assent of Congress to certain acts of the states of Maryland, Georgia, and Rhode Island and Providence Plantations.	Sess. 2, ch. 43	1 Stat. 184 (chapter 43)
39	August 12, 1790	Appropriations for the Support of Government.	An Act making certain appropriations therein mentioned.	Sess. 2, ch. 46	1 Stat. 185
40	August 12, 1790	Debt of the United States.	An Act making provision for the Reduction of the Public Debt.	Sess. 2, ch. 47	1 Stat. 186

=== Third Session (December 6, 1790—March 3, 1791) ===
Public Laws
	Date	Subject Matter	Title	Chapter	Legal Citation (link to full text)
1	Dec. 27, 1790	Provisions of the Act for the Collection of Duties extended to act of August 10, 1790.	An Act supplementary to the act intitled “An act making further provision for the payment of the debts of the United States.”	Sess. 3, ch. 1	1 Stat. 188 (chapter 1)
2	Jan. 7, 1791	Unlading of Ships and Vessels in cases of Obstruction by Ice.	An Act to provide for the unlading of ships or vessels, in cases of obstruction by Ice.	Sess. 3, ch. 2	1 Stat. 188 (chapter 2)
3	Jan. 10, 1791	Assent of Congress to Acts of Georgia, and Rhode Island, and Providence Plantations extended.	An Act to continue an act intituled “An act declaring the assent of Congress to certain acts of the States of Maryland, Georgia, and Rhode Island and Providence Plantations,” so far as the same respects the States of Georgia and Rhode Island and Providence Plantations.	Sess. 3, ch. 3	1 Stat. 189 (chapter 3)
4	Feb. 4, 1791	State of Kentucky formed and admitted into the Union.	An Act declaring the consent of Congress, that a new State be formed within the jurisdiction of the Commonwealth of Virginia, and admitted into this Union, by the name of the State of Kentucky.	Sess. 3, ch. 4	1 Stat. 189 (chapter 4)
5	Feb. 9, 1791	Assent of Congress to Act of Maryland.	An Act declaring the consent of Congress to a certain act of the state of Maryland.	Sess. 3, ch. 5	1 Stat. 190 (chapter 5)
6	Feb. 11, 1791	Appropriations for the Support of Government, &c.	An Act making appropriations for the support of Government during the year one thousand seven hundred and ninety-one, and for other purposes.	Sess. 3, ch. 6	1 Stat. 190 (chapter 6)
7	Feb. 18, 1791	State of Vermont admitted into the Union.	An Act for the admission of the State of Vermont into this Union.	Sess. 3, ch. 7	1 Stat. 191 (chapter 7)
8	Feb. 18, 1791	Process in the Courts of the United States.	An Act to continue in force, for a limited time, an act passed at the first Session of Congress, intituled “An act to regulate processes in the Courts of the United States.”	Sess. 3, ch. 8	1 Stat. 191 (chapter 8)
9	Feb. 25, 1791	Representatives in Congress from Kentucky and Vermont.	An Act regulating the number of Representatives to be chosen by the States of Kentucky and Vermont.	Sess. 3, ch. 9	1 Stat. 191 (chapter 9)
10	Feb. 25, 1791	Bank of the United States incorporated.	An Act to incorporate the subscribers to the Bank of the United States. (First Bank of the United States)	Sess. 3, ch. 10	1 Stat. 191 (chapter 10)
11	March 2, 1791	Bank of the United States, Supplementary Act to the Act incorporating the.	An Act supplementary to the act intituled “An act to incorporate the subscribers to the Bank of the United States.”	Sess. 3, ch. 11	1 Stat. 196
12	March 2, 1791	Laws of the United States extended to Vermont.	An Act giving effect to the laws of the United States within the state of Vermont.	Sess. 3, ch. 12	1 Stat. 197
13	March 2, 1791	Debt of the United States, Duties on certain Merchandise.	An Act to explain and amend an act intituled “An act making further provision for the payment of the debts of the United States.”	Sess. 3, ch. 13	1 Stat. 198 (chapter 13)
14	March 2, 1791	Meeting of Congress.	An Act fixing the time for the next annual meeting of Congress.	Sess. 3, ch. 14	1 Stat. 198 (chapter 14)
15	March 3, 1791	Duties on Distilled Spirits imported into, and distilled in the United States.	An Act repealing, after the last day of June next, the duties heretofore laid upon Distilled Spirits imported from abroad, and laying others in their stead; and also upon Spirits distilled within the United States, and for appropriating the same. (Whiskey Act)	Sess. 3, ch. 15	1 Stat. 199
16	March 3, 1791	Appropriation for the Recognition of the Treaty with Morocco.	An Act making an appropriation for the purpose therein mentioned.	Sess. 3, ch. 16	1 Stat. 214 (chapter 16)
17	March 3, 1791	Temporary and Permanent Seat of the Government.	An Act to amend “An act for establishing the temporary and permanent seat of the Government of the United States.”	Sess. 3, ch. 17	1 Stat. 214 (chapter 17)
18	March 3, 1791	Treasury Department, and farther Compensation to certain Officers.	An Act supplemental to the act “establishing the Treasury Department,” and for a farther compensation to certain officers.	Sess. 3, ch. 18	1 Stat. 215 (chapter 18)
19	March 3, 1791	Rix-dollar of Denmark.	An Act relative to the Rix-Dollar of Denmark.	Sess. 3, ch. 19	1 Stat. 215 (chapter 19)
20	March 3, 1791	Salaries of Executive Officers and their Assistants and Clerks.	An Act in addition to an act intituled “An act for establishing the salaries of the Executive officers of Government, with their assistants and clerks.”	Sess. 3, ch. 20	1 Stat. 216 (chapter 20)
21	March 3, 1791	Compensations to the Commissioners of Loans for Extraordinary Expenses.	An Act for making compensation to the Commissioners of Loans, for extraordinary expenses.	Sess. 3, ch. 21	1 Stat. 216 (chapter 21)
22	March 3, 1791	Compensation of the Officers of the Judicial Courts of the United States and for Jurors and Witnesses.	An Act providing compensations for the officers of the Judicial Courts of the United States, and for Jurors and Witnesses, and for other purposes.	Sess. 3, ch. 22	1 Stat. 216 (chapter 22)
23	March 3, 1791	Post-office.	An Act to continue in force for a limited time, an act intituled "An act for the temporary establishment of the Post-Office."	Sess. 3, ch. 23	1 Stat. 218 (chapter 23)
24	March 3, 1791	Act for Payment of Pensions, and for Support of Light-houses, Beacons, &c. continued.	An Act to continue in force the act therein mentioned, and to make further provision for the payment of Pensions to Invalids, and for the support of lighthouses, buoys, and public piers.	Sess. 3, ch. 24	1 Stat. 218 (chapter 24)
25	March 3, 1791	Debt of the United States, Loan in Holland sanctioned.	An Act supplementary to the act making provision for the reduction of the Public Debt.	Sess. 3, ch. 25	1 Stat. 218 (chapter 25)
26	March 3, 1791	Collection of Duties on Teas and Wines.	An Act making farther provision for the collection of the duties by law imposed on Teas, and to prolong the term for the payment of the Duties on Wines.	Sess. 3, ch. 26	1 Stat. 219
27	March 3, 1791	Lands of the United States granted to Settlers in Vincennes and the Illinois Country.	An Act for granting lands to the Inhabitants and settlers at Vincennes and the Illinois country, in the territory northwest of the Ohio, and for confirming them in their possessions.	Sess. 3, ch. 27	1 Stat. 221
28	March 3, 1791	Addition to the Army of the United States and Provisions for the Protection of the Frontiers.	An Act for raising and adding another Regiment to the Military Establishment of the United States, and for making farther provision for the protection of the frontiers.	Sess. 3, ch. 28	1 Stat. 222

== 2nd United States Congress ==
=== First Session (October 24, 1791–May 8, 1792) ===
Public Laws
	Date	Subject Matter	Title	Chapter	Legal Citation (link to full text)
1	November 8, 1791	Enumeration of South Carolina.	An Act granting farther Time for making Return of the Enumeration of the Inhabitants in the District of South Carolina.	Sess. 1, ch. 1	1 Stat. 226 (chapter 1)
2	December 23, 1791	Appropriations for the Support of Government.	An Act making Appropriation for the Support of Government for the year one thousand seven hundred and ninety-two.	Sess. 1, ch. 3	1 Stat. 226 Chapter 3)
3	December 23, 1791		An Act for carrying into effect a Contract between the United States and the State of Pennsylvania.	Sess. 1, ch. 4	1 Stat. 229 Chapter 4)
4	January 23, 1792		An Act to extend the time limited for settling the Accounts of the United States with the individual states.	Sess. 1, ch. 5	1 Stat. 229 Chapter 5)
5	February 16, 1792		An Act concerning certain Fisheries of the United States, and for the regulation and government of the Fishermen employed therein.	Sess. 1, ch. 6	1 Stat. 229 Chapter 6)
6	February 16, 1792		An Act to establish the Post-Office and Post Roads within the United States.	Sess. 1, ch. 7	1 Stat. 232
7	March 1, 1792		An Act relative to the Election of a President and Vice President of the United States, and declaring the Officer who shall act as President in case of Vacancies in the offices both of President and Vice President.	Sess. 1, ch. 8	1 Stat. 239
8	March 5, 1792		An Act for making farther and more effectual Provision for the Protection of the Frontiers of the United States.	Sess. 1, ch. 9	1 Stat. 241
9	March 19, 1792		An Act declaring the consent of Congress to a certain Act of the State of Maryland, and to continue for a longer time, an Act declaring the assent of Congress to certain Acts of the States of Maryland, Georgia, and Rhode Island and Providence Plantations, so far as the same respects the States of Georgia, and Rhode Island and Providence Plantations.	Sess. 1, ch. 10	1 Stat. 243 (chapter 10)
10	March 23, 1792		An Act to provide for the settlement of the Claims of Widows and Orphans barred by the limitations heretofore established, and to regulate the Claims to Invalid Pensions.	Sess. 1, ch. 11	1 Stat. 243 (chapter 11)
11	March 27, 1792		An Act providing for the settlement of the Claims of Persons under particular circumstances barred by the limitations heretofore established.	Sess. 1, ch. 12	1 Stat. 245
12	March 28, 1792		An Act supplemental to the act for making farther and more effectual provision for the protection of the frontiers of the United States.	Sess. 1, ch. 14	1 Stat. 246 (chapter 14)
13	April 2, 1792		An Act for finishing the Lighthouse on Baldhead at the mouth of Cape Fear river in the State of North Carolina.	Sess. 1, ch. 15	1 Stat. 246 (chapter 15)
14	April 2, 1792		An Act establishing a Mint, and regulating the Coins of the United States.	Sess. 1, ch. 16	1 Stat. 246 (chapter 16)
15	April 12, 1792		An Act supplementary to the act for the establishment and support of lighthouses, beacons, buoys, and public piers.	Sess. 1, ch. 17	1 Stat. 251 (chapter 17)
16	April 12, 1792		An Act to erect a Lighthouse on Montok Point in the state of New York.	Sess. 1, ch. 18	1 Stat. 251 (chapter 18)
17	April 12, 1792		An Act for fixing the compensations of the Doorkeepers of the Senate and House of Representatives in Congress.	Sess. 1, ch. 20	1 Stat. 252 (chapter 20)
18	April 13, 1792		An Act for altering the times of holding the Circuit Courts, in certain districts of the United States, and for other purposes.	Sess. 1, ch. 21	1 Stat. 252 (chapter 21)
19	April 14, 1792		An Act for apportioning Representatives among the several States, according to the first enumeration.	Sess. 1, ch. 23	1 Stat. 253
20	April 14, 1792		An Act concerning Consuls and Vice-Consuls.	Sess. 1, ch. 24	1 Stat. 254
21	April 21, 1792		An Act authorizing the grant and conveyance of certain Lands to the Ohio Company of Associates.	Sess. 1, ch. 25	1 Stat. 257
22	April 27, 1792		An Act to indemnify the Estate of the late Major General Nathaniel Green, for a certain bond entered into by him during the late war.	Sess. 1, ch. 26	1 Stat. 258
23	May 2, 1792		An Act to indemnify the Estate of the late Major General Nathaniel Green, for a certain bond entered into by him during the late war.	Sess. 1, ch. 27	1 Stat. 259
24	May 2, 1792		An Act to provide for calling forth the Militia to execute the laws of the Union, suppress insurrections and repel invasions.	Sess. 1, ch. 28	1 Stat. 264

- May 8, 1792: Second Militia Act of 1792, Sess. 1, ch. 33, 1 Stat. 271
- February 12, 1793: Fugitive Slave Law of 1793, Sess. 2, ch. 7, 1 Stat. 302
- February 18, 1793: An Act for enrolling and licensing ships or vessels to be employed in the coasting trade and fisheries, and for regulating the same, Sess. 2, ch. 8, 1 Stat. 305
- March 2, 1793: Judiciary Act of 1793, Sess. 2, ch. 22, 1 Stat. 333 (including Anti-Injunction Act)

== 3rd United States Congress ==
- March 27, 1794: Naval Act of 1794, Sess. 1, ch. 12, 1 Stat. 350
- January 29, 1795: Naturalization Act of 1795, Sess. 2, ch. 20, 1 Stat. 414

== 4th United States Congress ==
- May 28, 1796: Seamen's Protection Act, Sess. 1, ch. 36, 1 Stat. 477

== 5th United States Congress ==
- April 30, 1798: The U.S. Department of the Navy was established, Sess. 2, ch. 35, 1 Stat. 553
- June 18, 1798: Alien and Sedition Acts: An Act to establish a uniform rule of naturalization (Naturalization Act of 1798), Sess. 2, ch. 54, 1 Stat. 566
- June 25, 1798: Alien and Sedition Acts: An Act concerning Aliens, Sess. 2, ch. 58, 1 Stat. 570
- July 6, 1798: Alien and Sedition Acts: An Act respecting Alien Enemies, Sess. 2, ch. 66, 1 Stat. 577
- July 9, 1798: Act Further to Protect the Commerce of the United States, Sess. 2, ch. 68, 1 Stat. 578
- July 11, 1798: The Marine Corps was established, Sess. 2, ch. 72, 1 Stat. 594
- July 14, 1798: Alien and Sedition Acts: An Act for the punishment of certain crimes against the United States (Sedition Act), Sess. 2, ch. 74, 1 Stat. 596
- July 16, 1798: An Act for the relief of sick and disabled seamen, Sess. 2, ch. 77, 1 Stat. 605

== 6th United States Congress ==
- April 4, 1800: Bankruptcy Act of 1800, Sess. 1, ch. 19, 2 Stat. 19
- May 2, 1800: Slave Trade Act of 1800, Sess. 2, ch. 51, 2 Stat. 70
- February 13, 1801: Judiciary Act of 1801, Sess. 2, ch. 4, 2 Stat. 89
- February 27, 1801: District of Columbia Organic Act of 1801, Sess. 2, ch. 15, 2 Stat. 103

== 7th United States Congress ==
- March 16, 1802: Military Peace Establishment Act, Sess. 1, ch. 9, 2 Stat. 132
- April 29, 1802: Judiciary Act of 1802, Sess. 1, ch. 31, 2 Stat. 156
- April 30, 1802: Enabling Act of 1802, Sess. 1, ch. 40, 2 Stat. 173

== 8th United States Congress ==
- March 26, 1804: Land Act of 1804, Sess. 1, ch. 35, 2 Stat. 277

== 9th United States Congress ==
- March 29, 1806: Cumberland Road, Sess. 1, ch. 19, 2 Stat. 357
- February 24, 1807: Seventh Circuit Act of 1807, Sess. 2, ch. 16, 2 Stat. 420
- March 2, 1807: Slave Trade Prohibition Act, Sess. 2, ch. 22, 2 Stat. 426
- March 3, 1807: Insurrection Act of 1807, Sess. 2, ch. 39, 2 Stat. 443

== 10th United States Congress ==
- December 22, 1807: Embargo Act of 1807, Sess. 1, ch. 5, 2 Stat. 451
- April 23, 1808: Militia Act of 1808, Sess. 1, ch. 55, 2 Stat. 490
- March 1, 1809: Non-Intercourse Act (1809), Sess. 2, ch. 24, 2 Stat. 528

== 11th United States Congress ==
- May 1, 1810: Macon's Bill Number 2, Sess. 2, ch. 39, 2 Stat. 605

== 12th United States Congress ==
[data missing]

== 13th United States Congress ==
April 16, 1814: Flotilla Service Act of 1814, Sess. 2, ch. 59, 3 Stat. 125

== 14th United States Congress ==
- April 10, 1816: Second Bank of the United States, Sess. 1, ch. 94, 3 Stat. 266
- April 27, 1816: Dallas tariff, Sess. 1, ch. 107, 3 Stat. 310

== 15th United States Congress ==
- April 4, 1818: Flag Act of 1818, Sess. 1, ch. 34, 3 Stat. 415
- April 18, 1818: Navigation Act of 1818, Sess. 1, ch. 70, 3 Stat. 432

== 16th United States Congress ==
- March 6, 1820: Missouri Compromise, Sess. 1, ch. 22, 3 Stat. 545
- April 24, 1820: Land Act of 1820, Sess. 1, ch. 51, 3 Stat. 566
- March 2, 1821: Relief Act of 1821, Sess. 2, ch. 12, 3 Stat. 612

== 17th United States Congress ==
[data missing]

== 18th United States Congress ==
- January 7, 1824: Tariff of 1824, Sess. 1, ch. 4, 4 Stat. 2
- April 30, 1824: General Survey Act, Sess. 1, ch. 46, 4 Stat. 22
- March 3, 1825: Crimes Act of 1825, Sess. 2, ch. 65, 4 Stat. 115

== 19th United States Congress ==
[data missing]

== 20th United States Congress ==
- May 24, 1828: Tariff of Abominations, Sess. 1, ch. 111, 4 Stat. 308

== 21st United States Congress ==
- May 28, 1830: Indian Removal Act, Sess. 1, ch. 148, 4 Stat. 411
- February 3, 1831: Copyright Act of 1831, Sess. 2, ch. 16, 4 Stat. 436

== 22nd United States Congress ==
- July 14, 1832: Tariff of 1832, Sess. 1, ch. 227, 4 Stat. 583
- March 2, 1833: Compromise Tariff (Tariff of 1833), Sess. 2, ch. 55, 4 Stat. 629
- March 2, 1833: Force Bill, Sess. 2, ch. 57, 4 Stat. 632

== 23rd United States Congress ==
- June 28, 1834: Coinage Act of 1834, Sess. 1, ch. 95, 4 Stat. 699
- June 30, 1834: An Act to Regulate Trade and Intercourse With the Indian Tribes, Sess. 1, ch. 161, 4 Stat. 729

== 24th United States Congress ==
- July 4, 1836: Patent Act of 1836, Sess. 1, ch. 357, 5 Stat. 117
- March 3, 1837: Eighth and Ninth Circuits Act of 1837, Sess. 2, ch. 34, 5 Stat. 176

== 25th United States Congress ==
[data missing]

== 26th United States Congress ==
[data missing]

== 27th United States Congress ==
- August 19, 1841: Bankruptcy Act of 1841, Sess. 1, ch. 9, 5 Stat. 440
- September 4, 1841: Preemption Act of 1841, Sess. 1, ch. 16, 5 Stat. 453
- August 4, 1842: Armed Occupation Act, Sess. 2, ch. 122, 5 Stat. 502
- August 30, 1842: Tariff of 1842 ("Black Tariff"), Sess. 2, ch. 270, 5 Stat. 548

== 28th United States Congress ==
- January 23, 1845: Presidential Election Day Act, Sess. 2, ch. 1, 5 Stat. 721
- March 3, 1845: An act relating to revenue cutters and steamers, Sess. 2, ch. 78, 5 Stat. 795 (the first time Congress overrode a presidential veto)

== 29th United States Congress ==
- July 9, 1846: District of Columbia retrocession, Sess. 1, ch. 35, 9 Stat. 35
- July 30, 1846: Walker tariff, Sess. 1, ch. 74, 9 Stat. 42
- August 6, 1846: Independent Treasury Act of 1846, Sess. 1, ch. 90, 9 Stat. 59

== 30th United States Congress ==
- March 3, 1849: Department of the Interior Act, Sess. 2, ch. 108, 9 Stat. 395
- March 3, 1849: Coinage Act of 1849, Sess. 2, ch. 109, 9 Stat. 397

== 31st United States Congress ==
- September 9, 1850: Compromise of 1850, Sess. 1, ch. 49, 9 Stat. 446
- September 18, 1850: Fugitive Slave Act, Sess. 1, ch. 60, 9 Stat. 462
- September 27, 1850: Donation Land Claim Act, Sess. 1, ch. 76, 9 Stat. 496
- March 3, 1851: California Land Act of 1851, Sess. 2, ch. 41, 9 Stat. 631
- March 3, 1851: Limitation of Liability Act of 1851, Sess. 2, ch. 43, 9 Stat. 635

== 32nd United States Congress ==
- February 21, 1853: Coinage Act of 1853, Sess. 2, ch. 79, 10 Stat. 160
- March 2, 1853: An act providing for administering the oath of office to William R. King, Vice President elect of the United States of America. Sess. 2, ch. 93, 10 Stat. 180

== 33rd United States Congress ==
- May 30, 1854: Kansas–Nebraska Act, Sess. 1, ch. 59, 10 Stat. 277

== 34th United States Congress ==
- August 18, 1856: Guano Islands Act, Sess. 1, ch. 164, 11 Stat. 119
- February 21, 1857: Coinage Act of 1857, Sess. 3, ch. 56, 11 Stat. 163

== 35th United States Congress ==
[data missing]

== 36th United States Congress ==
- June 16, 1860: Pacific Telegraph Act of 1860, Sess. 1, ch. 137, 12 Stat. 41
- March 2, 1861: Morrill Tariff, Sess. 2, ch. 68, 12 Stat. 178

== 37th United States Congress ==
- August 5, 1861: Revenue Act of 1861, Sess. 1, ch. 45, 12 Stat. 292
- August 6, 1861: Confiscation Act of 1861, Sess. 1, ch. 60, 12 Stat. 319
- February 25, 1862: Legal Tender Act of 1862, Sess. 2, ch. 33, 12 Stat. 345
- April 16, 1862: An Act for the Release of certain Persons held to Service or Labor within the District of Columbia, Sess. 2, ch. 54, 12 Stat. 376
- May 15, 1862: Department of Agriculture Act, Sess. 2, ch. 72, 12 Stat. 387
- May 20, 1862: Homestead Act of 1862, Sess. 2, ch. 75, 12 Stat. 392
- June 19, 1862: An Act to secure Freedom to all persons within the Territories of the United States, Sess. 2, ch. 111, 12 Stat. 432
- July 1, 1862: Revenue Act of 1862, Sess. 2, ch. 119, 12 Stat. 432
- July 1, 1862: Pacific Railroad Act of 1862, Sess. 2, ch. 120, 12 Stat. 489
- July 1, 1862: Morrill Anti-Bigamy Act, Sess. 2, ch. 126, 12 Stat. 501
- July 2, 1862: Morrill Act of 1862, Sess. 2, ch. 130, 12 Stat. 503
- July 17, 1862: Militia Act of 1862, Sess. 2, ch. 201, 12 Stat. 597
- February 24, 1863: Arizona Organic Act, Sess. 3, ch. 56, 12 Stat. 664
- February 25, 1863: National Bank Act of 1863, Sess. 3, ch. 58, 12 Stat. 665
- March 2, 1863: False Claims Act, Sess. 3, ch. 67, 12 Stat. 696
- March 3, 1863: Enrollment Act, Sess. 3, ch. 75, 12 Stat. 731
- March 3, 1863: Habeas Corpus Suspension Act (1863), Sess. 3, ch. 81, 12 Stat. 755
- March 3, 1863: Tenth Circuit Act of 1863, Sess. 3, ch. 100, 12 Stat. 794

== 38th United States Congress ==
- April 22, 1864: Coinage Act of 1864, Sess. 1, ch. 66, 13 Stat. 54
- June 30, 1864: Revenue Act of 1864, Sess. 1, ch. 178, 13 Stat. 223
- March 3, 1865: Freedmen's Bureau, Sess. 2, ch. 90, 13 Stat. 507

== 39th United States Congress ==
- April 9, 1866: Civil Rights Act of 1866, Sess. 1, ch. 31, 14 Stat. 27
- April 12, 1866: Contraction Act of 1866, Sess. 1, ch. 39, 14 Stat. 31
- July 23, 1866: Judicial Circuits Act, Sess. 1, ch. 210, 14 Stat. 209
- March 2, 1867: Reconstruction Act, Sess. 2, ch. 153, 14 Stat. 428
- March 2, 1867: Tenure of Office Act (1867), Sess. 2, ch. 154, 14 Stat. 430

== 40th United States Congress ==
- Reconstruction Acts, continued:
  - March 23, 1867, Sess. 1, ch. 6, 15 Stat. 2
  - July 19, 1867, Sess. 1, ch. 30, 15 Stat. 14
  - March 11, 1868, Sess. 2, ch. 25, 15 Stat. 41
- July 27, 1868: Expatriation Act of 1868, Sess. 2, ch. 249, 15 Stat. 223

== 41st United States Congress ==
- March 18, 1869: Public Credit Act of 1869, Sess. 1, ch. 1, 16 Stat. 1
- April 10, 1869: Judiciary Act of 1869 (Circuit Judges Act of 1869), Sess. 1, ch. 22, 16 Stat. 44
- May 31, 1870: Enforcement Act of 1870 (Civil Rights Act of 1870), Sess. 2, ch. 114, 16 Stat. 140
- June 22, 1870: Department of Justice Act, Sess. 2, ch. 150, 16 Stat. 162
- July 8, 1870: Copyright Act of 1870, Sess. 2, ch. 230, 16 Stat. 198
- July 12, 1870: Currency Act of 1870, Sess. 2, ch. 252, 16 Stat. 251
- July 14, 1870: Naturalization Act of 1870, Sess. 2, ch. 254, 16 Stat. 254
- July 14, 1870: Funding Act of 1870, Sess. 2, ch. 256, 16 Stat. 272
- February 21, 1871: District of Columbia Organic Act of 1871, Sess. 3, ch. 62, 16 Stat. 419

== 42nd United States Congress ==
- April 20, 1871: Third Enforcement Act (Civil Rights Act of 1871, Ku Klux Klan Act), Sess. 1, ch. 22, 17 Stat. 13
- March 1, 1872: Yellowstone Act, Sess. 2, ch. 24, 17 Stat. 32
- May 10, 1872: General Mining Act of 1872, Sess. 2, ch. 152, 17 Stat. 91
- May 22, 1872: Amnesty Act, Sess. 2, ch. 193, 17 Stat. 142
- June 1, 1872: Practice Conformity Act (precursor to the Rules Enabling Act), Sess. 2, ch. 255, 17 Stat. 196
- June 8, 1872: Post Office Consolidation Act of 1872, Sess. 2, ch. 335, 17 Stat. 283
- February 12, 1873: Coinage Act of 1873, Sess. 3, ch. 131, 17 Stat. 424
- March 3, 1873: Comstock Act of 1873, Sess. 3, ch. 258, 17 Stat. 598
- March 3, 1873: Timber Culture Act, Sess. 3, ch. 277, 17 Stat. 205

== 43rd United States Congress ==
- June 23, 1874: Poland Act, Sess. 1, ch. 469, 18 Stat. 253
- January 14, 1875: Specie Payment Resumption Act, Sess. 2, ch. 15, 18 Stat. 296
- March 1, 1875: Civil Rights Act of 1875, Sess. 2, ch. 114, 18 Stat. 335
- March 3, 1875: Page Act of 1875, Sess. 2, ch. 141, 18 Stat. 477

== 44th United States Congress ==
- March 3, 1877: Desert Land Act

== 45th United States Congress ==
- February 28, 1878: Bland–Allison Act (Coinage Act (Silver Dollar)), Sess. 2, ch. 20, 20 Stat. 25
- April 29, 1878: National Quarantine Act, Sess. 2, ch. 66, 20 Stat. 37
- June 3, 1878: Timber and Stone Act, Sess. 2, ch. 151, 20 Stat. 89
- June 18, 1878: Posse Comitatus Act, Sess. 2, ch. 263, §15, 20 Stat. 152
- February 26, 1879: To Promote a Knowledge of Steam Engineering and Iron Shipbuilding Act, Sess. 3, ch. 105, 20 Stat. 322

== 46th United States Congress ==
[data missing]

== 47th United States Congress ==
- February 25, 1882: Apportionment of the Tenth Census, Sess. 1, ch. 20, 22 Stat. 5
- May 6, 1882: Chinese Exclusion Act, Sess. 1, ch. 126, 22 Stat. 58
- August 2, 1882: River and Harbors Act of 1882
- January 16, 1883: Pendleton Civil Service Reform Act, Sess. 2, ch. 27, 22 Stat. 403
- March 3, 1883: Tariff of 1883 (Mongrel Tariff), Sess. 2, ch. 121, 22 Stat. 488

== 48th United States Congress ==
[data missing]

== 49th United States Congress ==
- January 19, 1886: Presidential Succession Act of 1886, Sess. 1, ch. 4, 24 Stat. 1
- June 19, 1886: Passenger Vessel Services Act of 1886, Sess. 1, ch. 421, 24 Stat. 79
- February 3, 1887: Electoral Count Act, Sess. 2, ch. 90, 24 Stat. 373
- February 4, 1887: Interstate Commerce Act of 1887, Sess. 2, ch. 104, 24 Stat. 379
- February 8, 1887: Dawes Act (Indian General Allotment Act), Sess. 2, ch. 119, 24 Stat. 388
- March 2, 1887: Agricultural Experiment Stations Act of 1887, Sess. 2, ch. 314, 24 Stat. 440
- March 2, 1887: Hatch Act of 1887, Sess. 2, ch. 314, 24 Stat. 440
- March 3, 1887: Tucker Act, Sess. 2, ch. 359, 24 Stat. 505
- March 3, 1887: Edmunds–Tucker Act, Sess. 2, ch. 397, 24 Stat. 635

== 50th United States Congress ==
- February 22, 1889: Enabling Act of 1889, Sess. 2, ch. 180, 25 Stat. 676

== 51st United States Congress ==
- May 2, 1890: Oklahoma Organic Act, Sess. 1, ch. 182, 26 Stat. 81
- June 27, 1890: Dependent and Disability Pension Act, Sess. 1, ch. 634, 26 Stat. 182
- July 2, 1890: Sherman Antitrust Act of 1890, Sess. 1, ch. 647, 26 Stat. 209
- July 14, 1890: Sherman Silver Purchase Act, Sess. 1, ch. 708, 26 Stat. 289
- August 30, 1890: Morrill Act of 1890, Sess. 1, ch. 841, 26 Stat. 417
- October 1, 1890: McKinley Tariff, Sess. 1, ch. 1244, 26 Stat. 567
- March 3, 1891: Judiciary Act of 1891 (Evarts Act), Sess. 2, ch. 517, 26 Stat. 826
- March 3, 1891: Immigration Act of 1891, Sess. 2, ch. 551, 26 Stat. 1084
- March 3, 1891: Land Revision Act of 1891, Sess. 2, ch. 561, 26 Stat. 1095
- March 3, 1891: Forest Reserve Act of 1891, Sess. 2, ch. 561, 26 Stat. 1095
- March 3, 1891: International Copyright Act of 1891, Sess. 2, ch. 565, 26 Stat. 1106
- March 3, 1891: Merchant Marine Act of 1891

== 52nd United States Congress ==
- May 5, 1892: Geary Act, Sess. 1, ch. 60, 27 Stat. 25 (amended the Chinese Exclusion Act)
- February 13, 1893: Harter Act (Carriage of Goods by Sea), Sess. 2, ch. 105, 27 Stat. 445

== 53rd United States Congress ==
- August 27, 1894: Wilson–Gorman Tariff Act, Sess. 2, ch. 349, §73, 28 Stat. 509
- January 12, 1895: Printing Act of 1895 (An Act Providing for the Public Printing and Binding and the Distribution of Public Documents), Sess. 3, ch. 23, 28 Stat. 601
- February 18, 1895: Maguire Act of 1895, Sess. 3, ch. 97, 28 Stat. 667

== 54th United States Congress ==
- May 21, 1896: Oil Pipe Line Act, 29 Stat. 127 (43 U.S.C. § 962 et seq.)
- May 22, 1896: Condemned Cannon Act, 29 Stat. 133
- May 28, 1896: United States Commissioners Act, 29 Stat. 184
- June 1, 1896: Married Women's Rights Act (District of Columbia), 29 Stat. 193
- June 6, 1896: Filled Cheese Act, 29 Stat. 253
- January 13, 1897: Stock Reservoir Act, 29 Stat. 484, (43 U.S.C. § 952 et seq.)
- March 2, 1897: Tea Importation Act, 29 Stat. 604, (21 U.S.C. § 41 et seq.)

== 55th United States Congress ==
- July 24, 1897: Dingley Act, Sess. 1, ch. 11, 30 Stat. 151
- April 20, 1898: Teller Amendment (Cuba), Sess. 2, Joint Res. 24, 30 Stat. 738
- April 25, 1898: Declaration of war on Spain (Spanish–American War), Sess. 2, ch. 189, 30 Stat. 364
- June 1, 1898: Erdman Act, Sess. 2, ch. 370, 30 Stat. 424
- June 13, 1898: War Revenue Act of 1898, Sess. 2, ch. 448, 30 Stat. 448
- June 28, 1898: Curtis Act of 1898, Sess. 2, ch. 517, 30 Stat. 495
- July 1, 1898: Bankruptcy Act of 1898 (Henderson-Nelson Act), Sess. 2, ch. 541, 30 Stat. 544
- July 7, 1898: Newlands Resolution, Sess. 2, Joint Res. 55, 30 Stat. 750
- March 3, 1899: Rivers and Harbors Act of 1899, Sess. 3, ch. 425, 30 Stat. 1121

== 56th United States Congress ==
- March 14, 1900: Gold Standard Act, Sess. 1, ch. 41, 31 Stat. 45
- April 12, 1900: Foraker Act, Sess. 1, ch. 191, 31 Stat. 77 (Puerto Rico Civil Code)
- April 30, 1900: Hawaiian Organic Act, Sess. 1, ch. 339, 31 Stat. 141
