= List of acts of the 119th United States Congress =

The 119th United States Congress, which began on January 3, 2025, and will end on January 3, 2027, has enacted 142 public laws and 2 private laws. Joe Biden, who was the incumbent president for the Congress's first 17 days, did not enact any laws before his presidential term expired. Many of the public laws at the start of the first session are public laws related to congressional disapproval of federal regulations passed under the Congressional Review Act.

== Public laws ==
The 119th Congress has enacted the following public laws:

Public law number	Date of enactment	Official short title(s)	Official title	PDF
119-1	January 29, 2025	Laken Riley Act	To require the Secretary of Homeland Security to take into custody immigrants who have been charged in the United States with theft, and for other purposes.	
119-2	March 14, 2025	(No short title)	Providing for congressional disapproval under chapter 8 of title 5, United States Code, of the rule submitted by the Environmental Protection Agency relating to "Waste Emissions Charge for Petroleum and Natural Gas Systems: Procedures for Facilitating Compliance, Including Netting and Exemptions".	
119-3	March 14, 2025	(No short title)	A joint resolution providing for congressional disapproval under chapter 8 of title 5, United States Code, of the rule submitted by the Bureau of Ocean Energy Management relating to "Protection of Marine Archaeological Resources".	
119-4	March 15, 2025	Full-Year Continuing Appropriations and Extensions Act, 2025	Making further continuing appropriations and other extensions for the fiscal year ending September 30, 2025, and for other purposes.	
119-5	April 10, 2025	(No short title)	Providing for congressional disapproval under chapter 8 of title 5, United States Code, of the rule submitted by the Internal Revenue Service relating to "Gross Proceeds Reporting by Brokers That Regularly Provide Services Effectuating Digital Asset Sales".	
119-6	May 9, 2025	(No short title)	Providing for congressional disapproval under chapter 8 of title 5, United States Code, of the rule submitted by the Department of Energy relating to "Energy Conservation Program: Energy Conservation Standards for Consumer Gas-fired Instantaneous Water Heaters".	
119-7	May 9, 2025	(No short title)	Providing for congressional disapproval under chapter 8 of title 5, United States Code, of the rule submitted by the Department of Energy relating to "Energy Conservation Program: Energy Conservation Standards for Walk-In Coolers and Walk-In Freezers".	
119-8	May 9, 2025	(No short title)	Providing for congressional disapproval under chapter 8 of title 5, United States Code, of the rule submitted by the Department of Energy relating to "Energy Conservation Program for Appliance Standards: Certification Requirements, Labeling Requirements, and Enforcement Provisions for Certain Consumer Products and Commercial Equipment".	
119-9	May 9, 2025	(No short title)	Providing for congressional disapproval under chapter 8 of title 5, United States Code, of the rule submitted by the Office of Energy Efficiency and Renewable Energy, Department of Energy relating to "Energy Conservation Program: Energy Conservation Standards for Commercial Refrigerators, Freezers, and Refrigerator-Freezers".	
119-10	May 9, 2025	(No short title)	Disapproving the rule submitted by the Bureau of Consumer Financial Protection relating to "Overdraft Lending: Very Large Financial Institutions".	
119-11	May 9, 2025	(No short title)	Disapproving the rule submitted by the Bureau of Consumer Financial Protection relating to "Defining Larger Participants of a Market for General-Use Digital Consumer Payment Applications".	
119-12	May 19, 2025	Tools to Address Known Exploitation by Immobilizing Technological Deepfakes on Websites and Networks Act (TAKE IT DOWN Act)	To require covered platforms to remove nonconsensual intimate visual depictions, and for other purposes.	
119-13	May 23, 2025	(No short title)	Providing for congressional disapproval under chapter 8 of title 5, United States Code, of the rule submitted by the National Park Service relating to "Glen Canyon National Recreation Area: Motor Vehicles".	
119-14	May 23, 2025	(No short title)	Providing for congressional disapproval under chapter 8 of title 5, United States Code, of the rule submitted by the Environmental Protection Agency relating to “National Emission Standards for Hazardous Air Pollutants: Rubber Tire Manufacturing”.	
119-15	June 12, 2025	(No short title)	Providing congressional disapproval under chapter 8 of title 5, United States Code, of the rule submitted by the Environmental Protection Agency relating to "California State Motor Vehicle and Engine Pollution Control Standards; Heavy-Duty Vehicle and Engine Emission Warranty and Maintenance Provisions; Advanced Clean Trucks; Zero Emission Airport Shuttle; Zero-Emission Power Train Certification; Waiver of Preemption; Notice of Decision".	
119-16	June 12, 2025	(No short title)	Providing congressional disapproval under chapter 8 of title 5, United States Code, of the rule submitted by the Environmental Protection Agency relating to 2 "California State Motor Vehicle and Engine Pollution Control Standards; Advanced Clean Cars II; Waiver of Preemption; Notice of Decision".	
119-17	June 12, 2025	(No short title)	Providing congressional disapproval under chapter 8 of title 5, United States Code, of the rule submitted by the Environmental Protection Agency relating to "California State Motor Vehicle and Engine and Nonroad Engine Pollution Control Standards; The 'Omnibus' Low NOX Regulation; Waiver of Preemption; Notice of Decision".	
119-18	June 12, 2025	Aerial Firefighting Enhancement Act of 2025	To amend the Wildfire Suppression Aircraft Transfer Act of 1996 to reauthorize the sale by the Department of Defense of aircraft and parts for wildfire suppression purposes, and for other purposes.	
119-19	June 20, 2025	(No short title)	Providing for congressional disapproval under chapter 8 of title 5, United States Code, of the rule submitted by the Office of the Comptroller of the Currency of the Department of the Treasury relating to the review of applications under the Bank Merger Act.	
119-20	June 20, 2025	(No short title)	Providing for congressional disapproval under chapter 8 of title 5, United States Code, of the rule submitted by the Environmental Protection Agency relating to "Review of Final Rule Reclassification of Major Sources as Area Sources Under Section 112 of the Clean Air Act".	
119-21	July 4, 2025	(No short title; however, as introduced, the bill had the short title of the "One Big Beautiful Bill Act," by which it is still popularly referred to)	To provide for reconciliation pursuant to title II of H. Con. Res. 14.	
119-22	July 7, 2025	Alaska Native Settlement Trust Eligibility Act	To amend the Alaska Native Claims Settlement Act to exclude certain payments to aged, blind, or disabled Alaska Natives or descendants of Alaska Natives from being used to determine eligibility for certain programs, and for other purposes.	
119-23	July 7, 2025	Alaska Native Village Municipal Lands Restoration Act of 2025	To amend the Alaska Native Claims Settlement Act to provide that Village Corporations shall not be required to convey land in trust to the State of Alaska for the establishment of Municipal Corporations, and for other purposes.	
119-24	July 15, 2025	Apex Area Technical Corrections Act	To amend the Apex Project, Nevada Land Transfer and Authorization Act of 1989 to include the City of North Las Vegas and the Apex Industrial Park Owners Association, and for other purposes.	
119-25	July 15, 2025	Salem Maritime National Historical Park Redesignation and Boundary Study Act	To redesignate the Salem Maritime National Historic Site as the "Salem Maritime National Historical Park", and for other purposes.	
119-26	July 16, 2025	Halt All Lethal Trafficking of Fentanyl Act (HALT Fentanyl Act)	To amend the Controlled Substances Act with respect to the scheduling of fentanyl related substances, and for other purposes.	
119-27	July 18, 2025	Guiding and Establishing National Innovation for U.S. Stablecoins Act (GENIUS Act)	To provide for the regulation of payment stablecoins, and for other purposes.	
119-28	July 24, 2025	Rescissions Act of 2025	To rescind certain budget authority proposed to be rescinded in special messages transmitted to the Congress by the President on June 3, 2025, in accordance with section 1012(a) of the Congressional Budget and Impoundment Control Act of 1974.	
119-29	July 24, 2025	Filing Relief for Natural Disasters Act	To amend the Internal Revenue Code of 1986 to modify the rules for postponing certain deadlines by reason of disaster.	
119-30	July 24, 2025	Jocelyn Nungaray National Wildlife Refuge Act	To rename the Anahuac National Wildlife Refuge located in the State of Texas as the "Jocelyn Nungaray National Wildlife Refuge".	
119-31	July 30, 2025	VA Home Loan Program Reform Act	To amend title 38, United States Code, to authorize the Secretary of Veterans Affairs to take certain actions in the case of a default on a home loan guaranteed by the Secretary, and for other purposes.	
119-32	August 14, 2025	ACES Act of 2025	To provide for a study by the National Academies of Sciences, Engineering, and Medicine on the prevalence and mortality of cancer among individuals who served as active duty aircrew in the Armed Forces, and for other purposes.	
119-33	August 14, 2025	(No short title)	To protect regular order for budgeting for the Department of Veterans Affairs, and for other purposes.	
119-34	August 19, 2025	Maintaining American Superiority by Improving Export Control Transparency Act	To amend the Export Control Reform Act of 2018 relating to licensing transparency.	
119-35	September 5, 2025	(No short title)	To name the Department of Veterans Affairs community-based outpatient clinic in Toms River, New Jersey, the Leonard G. 'Bud' Lomell, VA Clinic, and for other purposes.	
119-36	September 5, 2025	Homebuyers Privacy Protection Act	To amend the Fair Credit Reporting Act to prevent consumer reporting agencies from furnishing consumer reports under certain circumstances, and for other purposes.	
119-37	November 12, 2025	Continuing Appropriations, Agriculture, Legislative Branch, Military Construction and Veterans Affairs, and Extensions Act, 2026	Making continuing appropriations and extensions for fiscal year 2026, and for other purposes.	
119-38	November 19, 2025	Epstein Files Transparency Act	To require the Attorney General to release all documents and records in possession of the Department of Justice relating to Jeffrey Epstein, and for other purposes.	
119-39	November 25, 2025	Internal Revenue Service Math and Taxpayer Health Act	To amend the Internal Revenue Code of 1986 to require additional information on math and clerical error notices.	
119-40	November 25, 2025	Wetlands Conservation and Access Improvement Act of 2025	To amend the Pittman-Robertson Wildlife Restoration Act to provide that interest on obligations held in the Federal aid to wildlife restoration fund shall become available for apportionment at the beginning of fiscal year 2033.	
119-41	November 25, 2025	Bottles and Breastfeeding Equipment Screening Enhancement Act	To amend the Bottles and Breastfeeding Equipment Screening Act to require hygienic handling of breast milk and baby formula by security screening personnel of the Transportation Security Administration and personnel of private security companies providing security screening, and for other purposes.	
119-42	November 25, 2025	Veterans' Compensation Cost-of-Living Adjustment Act of 2025	To increase, effective as of December 1, 2025, the rates of compensation for veterans with service-connected disabilities and the rates of dependency and indemnity compensation for the survivors of certain disabled veterans, and for other purposes.	
119-43	December 1, 2025	Medal of Honor Act	To amend title 38, United States Code, to increase the rate of the special pension payable to Medal of Honor recipients, and for other purposes.	
119-44	December 1, 2025	SUPPORT for Patients and Communities Reauthorization Act of 2025	To reauthorize certain programs that provide for opioid use disorder prevention, treatment, and recovery, and for other purposes.	
119-45	December 2, 2025	Taiwan Assurance Implementation Act	To amend the Taiwan Assurance Act of 2020 to require periodic reviews and updated reports relating to the Department of State’s Taiwan Guidelines.	
119-46	December 2, 2025	(No short title)	Requesting the Secretary of the Interior to authorize unique and one-time arrangements for displays on the National Mall and the Washington Monument during the period beginning on December 31, 2025, and ending on January 5, 2026.	
119-47	December 5, 2025	(No short title)	Providing for congressional disapproval under chapter 8 of title 5, United States Code, of the rule submitted by the Bureau of Land Management relating to “National Petroleum Reserve in Alaska Integrated Activity Plan Record of Decision”.	
119-48	December 11, 2025	(No short title)	Providing for congressional disapproval under chapter 8 of title 5, United States Code, of the rule submitted by the Bureau of Land Management relating to "Miles City Field Office Record of Decision and Approved Resource Management Plan Amendment".	
119-49	December 11, 2025	(No short title)	Providing for congressional disapproval under chapter 8 of title 5, United States Code, of the rule submitted by the Bureau of Land Management relating to "North Dakota Field Office Record of Decision and Approved Resource Management Plan".	
119-50	December 11, 2025	(No short title)	Providing for congressional disapproval under chapter 8 of title 5, United States Code, of the rule submitted by the Bureau of Land Management relating to "Central Yukon Record of Decision and Approved Resource Management Plan".	
119-51	December 11, 2025	(No short title)	Providing for congressional disapproval under chapter 8 of title 5, United States Code, of the rule submitted by the Bureau of Land Management relating to "Buffalo Field Office Record of Decision and Approved Resource Management Plan Amendment".	
119-52	December 11, 2025	(No short title)	Providing for congressional disapproval under chapter 8 of title 5, United States Code, of the rule submitted by the Bureau of Land Management relating to "Coastal Plain Oil and Gas Leasing Program Record of Decision".	
119-53	December 12, 2025	Miracle on Ice Congressional Gold Medal Act	To award 3 Congressional Gold Medals to the members of the 1980 U.S. Olympic Men's Ice Hockey Team, in recognition of their extraordinary achievement at the 1980 Winter Olympics where, being comprised of amateur collegiate players, they defeated the dominant Soviet hockey team in the historic “Miracle on Ice”, revitalizing American morale at the height of the Cold War, inspiring generations and transforming the sport of hockey in the United States.	
119-54	December 12, 2025	Fairness for Servicemembers and their Families Act of 2025	To amend title 38, United States Code, to require the Secretary of Veterans Affairs to periodically review the automatic maximum coverage under the Servicemembers' Group Life Insurance program and the Veterans' Group Life Insurance program, and for other purposes.	
119-55	December 12, 2025	Montgomery GI Bill Selected Reserves Tuition Fairness Act of 2025	To Amend title 38, United States Code, to direct the Secretary of Veterans Affairs to disapprove courses of education offered by a public institution of higher learning that does not charge the in-State tuition rate to a veteran using certain educational assistance under title 10 of such Code, and for other purposes.	
119-56	December 12, 2025	Veteran Fraud Reimbursement Act of 2025	To amend title 38, United States Code, to improve the repayment by the Secretary of Veterans Affairs of benefits misused by a fiduciary, and for other purposes.	
119-57	December 12, 2025	Foundation of the Federal Bar Association Charter Amendments Act of 2025	To amend title 36, United States Code, to revise the Federal charter for the Foundation of the Federal Bar Association.	
119-58	December 18, 2025	Secure Rural Schools Reauthorization Act of 2025	To extend the Secure Rural Schools and Community Self-Determination Act of 2000.	
119-59	December 18, 2025	(No short title)	To designate the facility of the United States Postal Service located at 201 West Oklahoma Avenue in Guthrie, Oklahoma, as the "Oscar J. Upham Post Office".	
119-60	December 18, 2025	National Defense Authorization Act for Fiscal Year 2026	To authorize appropriations for fiscal year 2026 for military activities of the Department of Defense, for military construction, and for defense activities of the Department of Energy, to prescribe military personnel strengths for such fiscal year, and for other purposes.	
119-61	December 19, 2025	Wounded Knee Massacre Memorial and Sacred Site Act	To direct the Secretary of the Interior to complete all actions necessary for certain land to be held in restricted fee status by the Oglala Sioux Tribe and Cheyenne River Sioux Tribe, and for other purposes.	
119-62	December 26, 2025	Modernizing Access to our Public Waters Act of 2025	To provide for the standardization, consolidation, and publication of data relating to public outdoor recreational use of Federal waterways among Federal land and water management agencies, and for other purposes.	
119-63	December 26, 2025	Alaska Native Vietnam Era Veterans Land Allotment Extension Act of 2025	To extend the Alaska Native Vietnam era veterans land allotment program, and for other purposes.	
119-64	December 26, 2025	Disaster Related Extension of Deadlines Act	To amend the Internal Revenue Code of 1986 to make the postponement of certain deadlines by reason of disasters applicable to the limitation on credit or refund, and to take postponements into account for purposes of sending collection notices.	
119-65	December 26, 2025	Save Our Seas 2.0 Amendments Act	To amend the Save Our Seas 2.0 Act to improve the administration of the Marine Debris Foundation, to amend the Marine Debris Act to improve the administration of the Marine Debris Program of the National Oceanic and Atmospheric Administration, and for other purposes.	
119-66	December 26, 2025	Congressional Award Program Reauthorization Act	To reauthorize the Congressional Award Act.	
119-67	December 26, 2025	Great Lakes Fishery Research Reauthorization Act	To reauthorize funding to monitor, assess, and research the Great Lakes Basin, and for other purposes.	
119-68	December 29, 2025	La Paz County Solar Energy and Job Creation Act	To direct the Secretary of the Interior to convey certain Federal land in Arizona to La Paz County, Arizona, and for other purposes.	
119-69	January 14, 2026	Whole Milk for Healthy Kids Act of 2025	To amend the Richard B. Russell National School Lunch Act to allow schools that participate in the school lunch program to serve whole milk, and for other purposes.	
119-70	January 20, 2026	Disabled Veterans Housing Support Act	To amend section 102(a)(20) of the Housing and Community Development Act of 1974 to require the exclusion of service-connected disability compensation when determining whether a person is a person of low and moderate income, a person of low income, or a person of moderate income, and for other purposes.	
119-71	January 20, 2026	VA Budget Shortfall Accountability Act	To direct the Secretary of Veterans Affairs and the Comptroller General of the United States to report on certain funding shortfalls in the Department of Veterans Affairs.	
119-72	January 20, 2026	Focused Assistance and Skills Training for Veterans' Employment and Transition Success Act (FAST VETS Act)	To amend title 38, United States Code, to modify the conditions under which the Secretary of Veterans Affairs is required to redevelop the individualized vocational rehabilitation plan for a veteran, and for other purposes.	
119-73	January 23, 2026	Trafficking Survivors Relief Act	To provide for the vacating of certain convictions and expungement of certain arrests of victims of human trafficking.	
119-74	January 23, 2026	Commerce, Justice, Science; Energy and Water Development; and Interior and Environment Appropriations Act, 2026	Making consolidated appropriations for the fiscal year ending September 30, 2026, and for other purposes.	
119-75	February 3, 2026	Consolidated Appropriations Act, 2026	Making further consolidated appropriations for the fiscal year ending September 30, 2026, and for other purposes.	
119-76	February 6, 2026	Bankruptcy Administration Improvement Act of 2025	To amend titles 11 and 28, United States Code, to modify the compensation payable to trustees serving in cases under chapter 7 of title 11, United States Code, to extend the term of certain temporary offices of bankruptcy judges, and for other purposes.	
119-77	February 10, 2026	Ending Improper Payments to Deceased People Act	To improve coordination between Federal and State agencies and the Do Not Pay working system.	
119-78	February 18, 2026	(No short title)	Disapproving the action of the District of Columbia Council in approving the D.C. Income and Franchise Tax Conformity and Revision Temporary Amendment Act of 2025.	
119-79	February 18, 2026	Semiquincentennial Congressional Time Capsule Act	To provide for the creation of a congressional time capsule in commemoration of the semiquincentennial of the United States, and for other purposes.	
119-80	March 20, 2026	(No short title)	To waive the 60-day notice requirement for the posthumous honorary promotion of Captain Cody Khork, United States Army.	
119-81	March 26, 2026	(No short title)	To authorize the President to award the Medal of Honor to John W. Ripley for acts of valor during the Vietnam War, and for other purposes.	
119-82	April 13, 2026	Holocaust Expropriated Art Recovery Act of 2025	To clarify the Holocaust Expropriated Art Recovery Act of 2016, to appropriately limit the application of defenses based on the passage of time and other non-merits defenses to claims under that Act.	
119-83	April 13, 2026	Small Business Innovation and Economic Security Act	To extend the SBIR and STTR programs, and for other purposes.	
119-84	April 18, 2026	(No short title)	To amend the FISA Amendments Act of 2008 to extend the authorities of title VII of the Foreign Intelligence Surveillance Act of 1978 through April 30, 2026, and for other purposes.	
119-85	April 27, 2026	(No short title)	Providing for congressional disapproval under chapter 8 of title 5, United States Code, of the rule submitted by the Bureau of Land Management relating to Public Land Order No. 7917 for Withdrawal of Federal Lands; Cook, Lake, and Saint Louis Counties, MN.	
119-86	April 30, 2026	Homeland Security and Further Additional Continuing Appropriations Act, 2026	Making further consolidated appropriations for the fiscal year ending September 30, 2026, and for other purposes.	
119-87	April 30, 2026	(No short title)	To amend the FISA Amendments Act of 2008 to extend the authorities of title VII of the Foreign Intelligence Surveillance Act of 1978, and for other purposes.	
119-88	May 4, 2026	Tribal Trust Land Homeownership Act of 2025	To require the Bureau of Indian Affairs to process and complete all mortgage packages associated with residential and business mortgages on Indian land by certain deadlines, and for other purposes.	
119-89	May 11, 2026	Rural Broadband Protection Act of 2025	To require the Federal Communications Commission to establish a vetting process for prospective applicants for high-cost universal service program funding.	
119-90	May 11, 2026	(No short title)	To require the Federal Energy Regulatory Commission to extend the time period during which licensees are required to commence construction of certain hydropower projects.	
119-91	May 19, 2026	Sloan Canyon Conservation and Lateral Pipeline Act	To amend the Sloan Canyon National Conservation Area Act to adjust the boundary of the Sloan Canyon National Conservation Area, and for other purposes.	
119-92	May 19, 2026	Investing in All of America Act of 2025	To amend the Small Business Investment Act of 1958 to exclude from the limit on leverage certain amounts invested in smaller enterprises located in rural or low-income areas and small businesses in critical technology areas, and for other purposes.	
119-93	May 19, 2026	Cape Fox Land Entitlement Finalization Act of 2025	To provide equitable treatment for the people of the Village Corporation established for the Native Village of Saxman, Alaska, and for other purposes.	
119-94	May 28, 2026	Medal of Sacrifice Act of 2025	To establish a medal of service for law enforcement officers and first responders.	
119-95	May 29, 2026	(No short title)	To amend chapters 83 and 84 of title 5, United States Code, to authorize an increase of the retirement age for members of the Capitol Police.	
119-96	June 9, 2026	Gerald E. Connolly Esophageal Cancer Awareness Act of 2025	To require the Government Accountability Office to produce a report on esophageal cancer, and for other purposes.	
119-97	June 9, 2026	Fiscal Year 2025 Veterans Affairs Major Medical Facility Authorization Act	To authorize a major medical facility project for the Department of Veterans Affairs for fiscal year 2026 in St. Louis, Missouri, and for other purposes.	
119-98	June 10, 2026	Secure America Act	To provide for reconciliation pursuant to title II of S. Con. Res. 33.	
119-99	June 12, 2026	Alaska's Right to Ivory Sales and Tradition Act	To amend the Marine Mammal Protection Act of 1972 to protect the cultural practices and livelihoods of producers of Alaska Native handicrafts and marine mammal ivory products, and for other purposes.	
119-100	June 26, 2026	Lulu's Law	To require the Federal Communications Commission to issue an order providing that a shark attack is an event for which a wireless emergency alert may be transmitted, and for other purposes.	
119-101	July 11, 2026	21st Century ROAD to Housing Act	To increase the supply of housing in America, and for other purposes.	
119-102	July 12, 2026	Emergency Conservation Program Improvement Act of 2025	To amend the Agricultural Credit Act of 1978 to remove barriers to agricultural producers in accessing funds to carry out emergency measures under the emergency conservation program, and for other purposes.	
119-103	September 2, 2026	Continuing Appropriations and Extensions Act, 2027	Making continuing appropriations and extensions for fiscal year 2027, and for other purposes.	
119-104	September 10, 2026	Hershel "Woody" Williams National Medal of Honor Monument Location Act	To authorize the National Medal of Honor Museum Foundation to establish a commemorative work on the National Mall to honor the extraordinary acts of valor, selfless service, and sacrifice displayed by Medal of Honor recipients.	
119-105	September 11, 2026	(No short title)	To remove restrictions from a parcel of land in Paducah, Kentucky.	
119-106	September 11, 2026	Stop Secret Spending Act of 2025	To amend the Federal Funding Accountability and Transparency Act of 2006 to ensure that other transaction agreements are reported to USAspending.gov, and for other purposes.	
119-107	September 11, 2026	National Emergency Medical Services Memorial Extension Act	To provide for an extension of the legislative authority of the National Emergency Medical Services Memorial Foundation to establish a commemorative work in the District of Columbia and its environs.	
119-108	September 11, 2026	Doug LaMalfa Federal Disaster Tax Relief Certainty Act	To amend the Internal Revenue Code of 1986 to codify and extend the rules for personal casualty losses arising from major disasters and the rules for the exclusion from gross income of compensation for losses or damages resulting from certain wildfires.	
119-109	September 16, 2026	Local Access to Courts Act	To clarify where court may be held for certain district courts in Texas and California.	
119-110	September 16, 2026	Prison Staff Safety Enhancement Act	To address sexual harassment and sexual assault of Bureau of Prisons staff in prisons, and for other purposes.	
119-111	September 18, 2026	Lindsey O. Graham Sanctioning Russia and Iran Act of 2026	To impose sanctions and other measures with respect to the Russian Federation, as championed by the late Senator Lindsey O. Graham, and for other purposes.	
119-112	September 25, 2026	Hydropower Licensing Transparency Act	To amend the Federal Power Act to require the Federal Energy Regulatory Commission to annually submit to Congress a report on the status of ongoing hydropower relicensing applications.	
119-113	September 25, 2026	(No short title)	To reauthorize the Fort Peck Reservation Rural Water System Act of 2000.	
119-114	September 25, 2026	(No short title)	To provide for the equitable settlement of certain Indian land disputes regarding land in Illinois, and for other purposes.	
119-115	September 25, 2026	(No short title)	To designate the General George C. Marshall House, in the Commonwealth of Virginia, as an affiliated area of the National Park System, and for other purposes.	
119-116	September 25, 2026	Modernizing Access to Our Public Oceans Act	To provide for the standardization, publication, and accessibility of data relating to public outdoor recreational use of Federal waterways, and for other purposes.	
119-117	September 25, 2026	(No short title)	To redesignate the National Historic Trails Interpretive Center in Casper, Wyoming, as the "Barbara L. Cubin National Historic Trails Interpretive Center".	
119-118	September 30, 2026	Kay Hagan Tick Reauthorization Act	To reauthorize the Kay Hagan Tick Act, and for other purposes.	
119-119	October 7, 2026	Improving Social Security’s Service to Victims of Identity Theft Act	To amend title VII of the Social Security Act to provide for a single point of contact at the Social Security Administration for individuals who are victims of identity theft.	
119-120	October 7, 2026	Billion Dollar Boondoggle Act of 2025	To require an annual report of taxpayer-funded projects that are over budget and behind schedule.	
119-121	October 9, 2026	American Music Tourism Act of 2025	To amend the Visit America Act to promote music tourism, and for other purposes.	
119-122	October 15, 2026	Crow Tribe Water Rights Settlement Amendments Act of 2025	To amend the Crow Tribe Water Rights Settlement Act of 2010 to make improvements to that Act, and for other purposes.	
119-123	October 15, 2026	Illegal Red Snapper and Tuna Enforcement Act	To require the Under Secretary of Commerce for Standards and Technology and the Administrator of National Oceanic and Atmospheric Administration to develop a standard methodology for identifying the country of origin of seafood to support enforcement against illegal, unreported, and unregulated fishing, and for other purposes.	
119-124	October 15, 2026	Retire through Ownership Act	To amend the Employee Retirement Income Security Act of 1974 to provide a clear definition of adequate consideration for certain closely held stock, and for other purposes.	
119-125	October 20, 2026	Clergy Act	To allow a period in which members of the clergy may revoke their exemption from Social Security coverage, and for other purposes.	
119-126	October 20, 2026	(No short title)	To require the Secretary of Agriculture to convey the Pleasant Valley Ranger District Administrative Site to Gila County, Arizona.	
119-127	October 20, 2026	Critical Infrastructure Manufacturing Feasibility Act	To direct the Secretary of Commerce to conduct a study on the feasibility of manufacturing in the United States products for critical infrastructure sectors, and for other purposes.	
119-128	October 20, 2026	Lower Elwha Klallam Tribe Project Lands Restoration Act	To take certain Federal land in the State of Washington into trust for the Lower Elwha Klallam Tribe, and for other purposes.	
119-129	October 20, 2026	Romance Scam Prevention Act	To require online dating service providers to provide fraud ban notifications to online dating service members, and for other purposes.	
119-130	October 20, 2026	Southcentral Foundation Land Transfer Act of 2025	To provide for the conveyance of certain property to the Southcentral Foundation located in Anchorage, Alaska, and for other purposes.	
119-131	October 20, 2026	Enhancing Detection of Human Trafficking Act	To direct the Secretary of Labor to train certain employees of Department of Labor how to effectively detect and assist law enforcement in preventing human trafficking during the course of their official duties, and for other purposes.	
119-132	October 20, 2026	Vicksburg National Military Park Boundary Modification Act	To modify the boundary of the Vicksburg National Military Park in the State of Mississippi, and for other purposes.	
119-133	October 20, 2026	Chiricahua National Park Act	To redesignate the Chiricahua National Monument in the State of Arizona as Chiricahua National Park, and for other purposes.	
119-134	October 20, 2026	License to Drill Act	To amend the Mineral Leasing Act to extend the period of time during which the Secretary of the Interior is required to collect a fee for each new application for a permit to drill, and for other purposes.	
119-135	October 22, 2026	Reversionary Interest Conveyance Act	To convey the reversionary interest of the United States in certain land in Sacramento, California.	
119-136	October 22, 2026	Mystic Alerts Act	To provide for the transmission of emergency alerts by satellite, and for other purposes.	
119-137	November 3, 2026	United States Commission on International Religious Freedom Reauthorization Act of 2026	To extend and authorize annual appropriations for the United States Commission on International Religious Freedom through December 31, 2028.	
119-138	November 3, 2026	Accelerating Access to Critical Therapies for ALS Reauthorization Act of 2026	To amend the Accelerating Access to Critical Therapies for ALS Act to reauthorize the provisions of such Act through fiscal year 2031, and for other purposes.	
119-139	November 10, 2026	National Taxpayer Advocate Enhancement Act of 2025	To amend the Internal Revenue Code of 1986 to conform to the intent of the Internal Revenue Service Restructuring and Reform Act of 1998, as set forth in the joint explanatory statement of the committee of conference accompanying Conference Report 105–599, that the National Taxpayer Advocate be able to hire and consult counsel as appropriate.	
119-140	November 10, 2026	Choices for Increased Mobility Act of 2026	To amend title XVIII of the Social Security Act to clarify payment rules for manual wheelchairs under part B of the Medicare program.	
119-141	November 10, 2026	America’s National Churchill Museum National Historic Landmark Act	To designate the America’s National Churchill Museum National Historic Landmark, and for other purposes.	
119-142	November 10, 2026	Bankruptcy Threshold Adjustment Act	To amend title 11, United States Code, to modify certain bankruptcy eligibility requirements, and for other purposes.	

== Private laws ==
The 119th Congress has enacted the following private laws:

Private law number	Date of enactment	Official short title(s)	Official title	PDF
119-1	March 26, 2026	(No short title)	To authorize the President to award the Medal of Honor to James Capers, Jr., for acts of valor as a member of the Marine Corps during the Vietnam War.	
119-2	March 26, 2026	Nicholas Dockery Medal of Honor Act	To authorize the President to award the Medal of Honor to Nicholas Dockery for acts of valor as a member of the Army while serving in Afghanistan.	

== See also ==
- List of bills in the 119th United States Congress
- List of United States federal legislation
- Lists of acts of the United States Congress
- 2020s in United States political history
- List of executive actions by Donald Trump
- List of executive orders in the second presidency of Donald Trump
- Congressional Review Act
