= List of United States federal legislation, 2001–present =

This is a chronological list of United States federal legislation passed by the 107th and subsequent United States Congresses, starting in 2001. It includes links to articles on major legislation. For comprehensive lists, see the lists of acts passed by each Congress. For the main article on this subject, see List of United States federal legislation. Additional lists can be found at List of United States federal legislation: Congress of the Confederation, List of United States federal legislation, 1789–1901 and List of United States federal legislation, 1901–2001.

== 107th United States Congress ==
- June 7, 2001: Economic Growth and Tax Relief Reconciliation Act of 2001, Pub. L. 107–16 (text) (PDF), 115 Stat. 38
- September 18, 2001: Authorization for Use of Military Force of 2001, Pub. L. 107–40 (text) (PDF), 115 Stat. 224
- October 26, 2001: Patriot Act, Pub. L. 107–56 (text) (PDF), 115 Stat. 272
- November 19, 2001: Aviation and Transportation Security Act, Pub. L. 107–71 (text) (PDF), 115 Stat. 597
- December 21, 2001: Zimbabwe Democracy and Economic Recovery Act of 2001, Pub. L. 107–99 (text) (PDF), 115 Stat. 962
- January 8, 2002: No Child Left Behind Act, Pub. L. 107–110 (text) (PDF), 115 Stat. 1425
- January 11, 2002: Small Business Liability Relief and Brownfields Revitalization Act, Pub. L. 107–118 (text) (PDF), 115 Stat. 2356
- March 9, 2002: Job Creation and Worker Assistance Act of 2002, Pub. L. 107–147 (text) (PDF), 116 Stat. 21
- March 27, 2002: Bipartisan Campaign Reform Act (McCain-Feingold), Pub. L. 107–155 (text) (PDF), 116 Stat. 81
- May 13, 2002: Farm Security and Rural Investment Act of 2002, Pub. L. 107–171 (text) (PDF), 116 Stat. 134
- July 30, 2002: Sarbanes–Oxley Act, Pub. L. 107–204 (text) (PDF), 116 Stat. 745
- August 6, 2002: Trade Act of 2002, Pub. L. 107–210 (text) (PDF), 116 Stat. 933
- October 16, 2002: Authorization for Use of Military Force Against Iraq Resolution of 2002, Pub. L. 107–243 (text) (PDF), 116 Stat. 1497
- October 21, 2002: Sudan Peace Act, Pub. L. 107–245 (text) (PDF), 116 Stat. 1504
- October 29, 2002: Help America Vote Act, Pub. L. 107–252 (text) (PDF), 116 Stat. 1666
- November 25, 2002: Homeland Security Act of 2002, Pub. L. 107–296 (text) (PDF), 116 Stat. 2135
- December 17, 2002: E-Government Act of 2002, Pub. L. 107–347 (text) (PDF), 116 Stat. 2899

== 108th United States Congress ==
- March 11, 2003: Do-Not-Call Implementation Act of 2003, Pub. L. 108–10 (text) (PDF), 117 Stat. 557
- April 30, 2003: PROTECT (Prosecutorial Remedies and Other Tools to end the Exploitation of Children Today) Act, Pub. L. 108–21 (text) (PDF), 117 Stat. 650 (including Illicit Drug Anti-Proliferation Act)
- May 28, 2003: Jobs and Growth Tax Relief Reconciliation Act of 2003, Pub. L. 108–27 (text) (PDF), 117 Stat. 752
- September 4, 2003: Prison Rape Elimination Act of 2003, Pub. L. 108–79 (text) (PDF), 117 Stat. 972
- October 28, 2003: Check 21 Act, Pub. L. 108–100 (text) (PDF), 117 Stat. 1177
- November 5, 2003: Partial-Birth Abortion Ban Act, Pub. L. 108–105 (text) (PDF), 117 Stat. 1201
- December 4, 2003: Fair and Accurate Credit Transactions Act, Pub. L. 108–159 (text) (PDF), 117 Stat. 1952
- December 8, 2003: Medicare Prescription Drug, Improvement, and Modernization Act, Pub. L. 108–173 (text) (PDF), 117 Stat. 2066
- December 12, 2003: Syria Accountability and Lebanese Sovereignty Restoration Act, Pub. L. 108–175 (text) (PDF), 117 Stat. 2481
- December 16, 2003: CAN-SPAM Act, Pub. L. 108–187 (text) (PDF), 117 Stat. 2699
- March 25, 2004: Unborn Victims of Violence Act (Laci and Conner's Law), Pub. L. 108–212 (text) (PDF), 118 Stat. 567
- June 30, 2004: Bunning-Bereuter-Blumenauer Flood Insurance Reform Act, Pub. L. 108–264 (text) (PDF), 118 Stat. 711
- July 7, 2004: GAO Human Capital Reform Act of 2004, Pub. L. 108–271 (text) (PDF), 118 Stat. 811
- October 16, 2004: Global Anti-Semitism Review Act, Pub. L. 108–332 (text) (PDF), 118 Stat. 1282
- October 18, 2004: North Korean Human Rights Act of 2004, Pub. L. 108–333 (text) (PDF), 118 Stat. 1287
- October 20, 2004: Belarus Democracy Act of 2004, Pub. L. 108–347 (text) (PDF), 118 Stat. 1383
- December 17, 2004: Intelligence Reform and Terrorism Prevention Act, Pub. L. 108–458 (text) (PDF), 118 Stat. 3637

== 109th United States Congress ==
- February 17, 2005: Class Action Fairness Act of 2005, Pub. L. 109–2 (text) (PDF), 118 Stat. 4
- March 21, 2005: Theresa Marie Schiavo's law, Pub. L. 109–3 (text) (PDF), 119 Stat. 15
- April 20, 2005: Bankruptcy Abuse Prevention and Consumer Protection Act, Pub. L. 109–8 (text) (PDF), 119 Stat. 23
- April 27, 2005: Family Entertainment and Copyright Act, Pub. L. 109–9 (text) (PDF), 119 Stat. 218
- July 28, 2005: Dominican Republic-Central America-United States Free Trade Agreement Implementation Act (CAFTA Implementation Act), Pub. L. 109–53 (text) (PDF), 119 Stat. 462
- July 29, 2005: Energy Policy Act of 2005, Pub. L. 109–58 (text) (PDF), 119 Stat. 594
- August 10, 2005: Transportation Equity Act of 2005, Pub. L. 109–59 (text) (PDF), 119 Stat. 1144
- October 26, 2005: Protection of Lawful Commerce in Arms Act, Pub. L. 109–92 (text) (PDF), 119 Stat. 2095
- December 1, 2005: Caribbean National Forest Act of 2005, Pub. L. 109–118 (text) (PDF), 119 Stat. 2527
- December 22, 2005: Presidential $1 Coin Act of 2005, Pub. L. 109–145 (text) (PDF), 119 Stat. 2664
- December 30, 2005: Department of Defense Appropriations Act, 2006, Pub. L. 109–148 (text) (PDF), 119 Stat. 2680 (including McCain Detainee Amendment)
- February 8, 2006: Deficit Reduction Act of 2005, Pub. L. 109–171 (text) (PDF), 120 Stat. 4 (including Federal Deposit Insurance Reform Act)
- May 17, 2006: Tax Increase Prevention and Reconciliation Act of 2005, Pub. L. 109–222 (text) (PDF), 120 Stat. 345
- May 29, 2006: Respect for America's Fallen Heroes Act, Pub. L. 109–228 (text) (PDF), 120 Stat. 387
- July 27, 2006: Adam Walsh Child Protection and Safety Act, Pub. L. 109–248 (text) (PDF), 120 Stat. 587
- September 26, 2006: Federal Funding Accountability and Transparency Act of 2006, Pub. L. 109–282 (text) (PDF), 120 Stat. 1186
- September 30, 2006: Iran Freedom and Support Act, Pub. L. 109–293 (text) (PDF), 120 Stat. 1344
- October 13, 2006: Darfur Peace and Accountability Act, Pub. L. 109–344 (text) (PDF), 120 Stat. 1869
- October 13, 2006: Safe Port Act, Pub. L. 109–347 (text) (PDF), 120 Stat. 1884 (including Unlawful Internet Gambling Enforcement Act of 2006)
- October 17, 2006: Military Commissions Act of 2006, Pub. L. 109–366 (text) (PDF), 120 Stat. 2600
- October 26, 2006: Secure Fence Act of 2006, Pub. L. 109–367 (text) (PDF), 120 Stat. 2638
- December 19, 2006: Combating Autism Act, Pub. L. 109–416 (text) (PDF)
- December 20, 2006: Tax Relief and Health Act of 2006, Pub. L. 109–432 (text) (PDF), 120 Stat. 2922
- December 20, 2006: Stolen Valor Act of 2005, Pub. L. 109–437 (text) (PDF), 120 Stat. 3266

== 110th United States Congress ==
- February 2, 2007: House Page Board Revision Act of 2007, Pub. L. 110–2 (text) (PDF), 121 Stat. 4
- May 25, 2007: U.S. Troop Readiness, Veterans' Care, Katrina Recovery, and Iraq Accountability Appropriations Act, 2007, Pub. L. 110–28 (text) (PDF), 121 Stat. 112
- June 14, 2007: Preserving United States Attorney Independence Act of 2007, Pub. L. 110–34 (text) (PDF), 121 Stat. 224 (including Fair Minimum Wage Act of 2007)
- July 26, 2007: Foreign Investment and National Security Act of 2007, Pub. L. 110–49 (text) (PDF), 121 Stat. 246
- August 3, 2007: Implementing Recommendations of the 9/11 Commission Act of 2007, Pub. L. 110–53 (text) (PDF), 121 Stat. 266
- August 5, 2007: Protect America Act of 2007, Pub. L. 110–55 (text) (PDF), 121 Stat. 552
- September 14, 2007: Honest Leadership and Open Government Act, Pub. L. 110–81 (text) (PDF), 121 Stat. 735
- September 27, 2007: Food and Drug Administration Amendments Act of 2007, Pub. L. 110–85 (text) (PDF), 121 Stat. 823
- November 8, 2007: Water Resources Development Act of 2007, Pub. L. 110–114 (text) (PDF), 121 Stat. 1041
- December 19, 2007: Energy Independence and Security Act of 2007, Pub. L. 110–140 (text) (PDF), 121 Stat. 1492
- February 13, 2008: Economic Stimulus Act of 2008, Pub. L. 110–185 (text) (PDF), 122 Stat. 613
- May 21, 2008: Genetic Information Nondiscrimination Act, Pub. L. 110–233 (text) (PDF), 122 Stat. 881
- May 22, 2008: Food, Conservation, and Energy Act of 2008, Pub. L. 110–234 (text) (PDF), 122 Stat. 923
- June 30, 2008: Supplemental Appropriations Act of 2008, Pub. L. 110–252 (text) (PDF), 122 Stat. 2323 (including Post-9/11 Veterans Educational Assistance Act of 2008 / "G.I. Bill 2008")
- July 10, 2008: FISA Amendments Act of 2008, Pub. L. 110–261 (text) (PDF), 122 Stat. 2436
- July 29, 2008: Tom Lantos Block Burmese JADE (Junta's Anti-Democratic Efforts) Act of 2008, Pub. L. 110–286 (text) (PDF), 122 Stat. 2632
- July 30, 2008: Housing and Economic Recovery Act of 2008, Pub. L. 110–289 (text) (PDF), 122 Stat. 2654
- October 3, 2008: Emergency Economic Stabilization Act of 2008, Pub. L. 110–343 (text) (PDF), 122 Stat. 3765
- October 7, 2008: Emmett Till Unsolved Civil Rights Crime Act, Pub. L. 110–344 (text) (PDF), 122 Stat. 3934
- December 23, 2008: Child Soldiers Prevention Act, Pub. L. 110–457 (text) (PDF), Title IV, 122 Stat. 5087

== 111th United States Congress ==
- January 29, 2009: Lilly Ledbetter Fair Pay Act of 2009, Pub. L. 111–2 (text) (PDF), 123 Stat. 5
- February 4, 2009: Children's Health Insurance Program Reauthorization Act (SCHIP), Pub. L. 111–3 (text) (PDF), 123 Stat. 8
- February 17, 2009: American Recovery and Reinvestment Act of 2009 (ARRA), Pub. L. 111–5 (text) (PDF), 123 Stat. 115
- March 11, 2009: Omnibus Appropriations Act of 2009, Pub. L. 111–8 (text) (PDF), 123 Stat. 524
- March 30, 2009: Omnibus Public Land Management Act of 2009, Pub. L. 111–11 (text) (PDF), 123 Stat. 991
- April 21, 2009: Edward M. Kennedy Serve America Act, Pub. L. 111–13 (text) (PDF), 123 Stat. 1460
- May 20, 2009: Fraud Enforcement and Recovery Act of 2009, Pub. L. 111–21 (text) (PDF), 123 Stat. 1617
- May 20, 2009: Helping Families Save Their Homes Act of 2009, Pub. L. 111–22 (text) (PDF), 123 Stat. 1632
- May 22, 2009: Weapon Systems Acquisition Reform Act of 2009, Pub. L. 111–23 (text) (PDF), 123 Stat. 1704
- May 22, 2009: Credit CARD Act of 2009, Pub. L. 111–24 (text) (PDF), 123 Stat. 1734
- June 22, 2009: Family Smoking Prevention and Tobacco Control Act, as Division A of Pub. L. 111–31 (text) (PDF), 123 Stat. 1776
- June 24, 2009: Supplemental Appropriations Act of 2009 including the Car Allowance Rebate System (Cash for Clunkers), Pub. L. 111–32 (text) (PDF), 123 Stat. 1859
- October 28, 2009: National Defense Authorization Act for Fiscal Year 2010, including the Matthew Shepard and James Byrd Jr. Hate Crimes Prevention Act, Pub. L. 111–84 (text) (PDF), 123 Stat. 2190
- November 6, 2009: Worker, Homeownership, and Business Assistance Act of 2009, Pub. L. 111–92 (text) (PDF), 123 Stat. 2984
- February 12, 2010: Statutory Pay-As-You-Go Act, as Title I of Pub. L. 111–139 (text) (PDF), 124 Stat. 8
- March 4, 2010: Travel Promotion Act of 2009, as Section 9 of Pub. L. 111–145 (text) (PDF), 124 Stat. 56
- March 18, 2010: Hiring Incentives to Restore Employment Act, Pub. L. 111–147 (text) (PDF), 124 Stat. 71
- March 23, 2010: Patient Protection and Affordable Care Act, Pub. L. 111–148 (text) (PDF), 124 Stat. 119
- March 30, 2010: Health Care and Education Reconciliation Act of 2010, including the Student Aid and Fiscal Responsibility Act, Pub. L. 111–152 (text) (PDF), 124 Stat. 1029
- May 5, 2010: Caregivers and Veterans Omnibus Health Services Act of 2010, Pub. L. 111–163 (text) (PDF), 124 Stat. 1130
- July 1, 2010: Comprehensive Iran Sanctions, Accountability, and Divestment Act of 2010, Pub. L. 111–195 (text) (PDF), 124 Stat. 1312
- July 21, 2010: Dodd–Frank Wall Street Reform and Consumer Protection Act, Pub. L. 111–203 (text) (PDF), 124 Stat. 1376
- August 10, 2010: SPEECH Act, Pub. L. 111–223 (text) (PDF), 124 Stat. 2380
- September 27, 2010: Small Business Jobs Act of 2010, Pub. L. 111–240 (text) (PDF), 124 Stat. 2504
- December 8, 2010: Claims Resolution Act of 2010, Pub. L. 111–291 (text) (PDF), 124 Stat. 3064
- December 13, 2010: Healthy, Hunger-Free Kids Act of 2010, Pub. L. 111–296 (text) (PDF), 124 Stat. 3183
- December 17, 2010: Tax Relief, Unemployment Insurance Reauthorization, and Job Creation Act of 2010, Pub. L. 111–312 (text) (PDF), 124 Stat. 3296
- December 22, 2010: Don't Ask, Don't Tell Repeal Act of 2010, Pub. L. 111–321 (text) (PDF), 124 Stat. 3515
- January 2, 2011: James Zadroga 9/11 Health and Compensation Act of 2010, Pub. L. 111–347 (text) (PDF), 124 Stat. 3623
- January 7, 2011: Ike Skelton National Defense Authorization Act for Fiscal Year 2011, Pub. L. 111–383 (text) (PDF), 124 Stat. 4137

== 112th United States Congress ==
- April 15, 2011: Department of Defense and Full-Year Continuing Appropriations Act, 2011, Pub. L. 112–10 (text) (PDF), 125 Stat. 38
- August 2, 2011: Budget Control Act of 2011, Pub. L. 112–25 (text) (PDF), 125 Stat. 240
- September 16, 2011: Leahy–Smith America Invents Act, Pub. L. 112–29 (text) (PDF), 125 Stat. 284
- October 21, 2011: United States–Korea Free Trade Agreement Implementation Act, Pub. L. 112–41 (text) (PDF), 125 Stat. 428
- October 21, 2011: United States–Colombia Trade Promotion Agreement Implementation Act, Pub. L. 112–42 (text) (PDF), 125 Stat. 462
- October 21, 2011: United States–Panama Trade Promotion Agreement Implementation Act, Pub. L. 112–43 (text) (PDF), 125 Stat. 497
- December 31, 2011: National Defense Authorization Act for Fiscal Year 2012, Pub. L. 112–81 (text) (PDF), 125 Stat. 1298
- February 22, 2012: Middle Class Tax Relief and Job Creation Act of 2012, Pub. L. 112–96 (text) (PDF), 126 Stat. 156
- March 8, 2012: Federal Restricted Buildings and Grounds Improvement Act of 2011, Pub. L. 112–98 (text) (PDF), 126 Stat. 263
- April 4, 2012: Stop Trading on Congressional Knowledge Act of 2012 (STOCK Act), Pub. L. 112–105 (text) (PDF), 126 Stat. 291
- April 5, 2012: Jumpstart Our Business Startups Act (JOBS Act), Pub. L. 112–106 (text) (PDF), 126 Stat. 306
- July 6, 2012: Moving Ahead for Progress in the 21st Century Act (MAP-21 Act), Pub. L. 112–141 (text) (PDF), 126 Stat. 405
- July 9, 2012: Food and Drug Administration Safety and Innovation Act (FDASIA), Pub. L. 112–144 (text) (PDF), 126 Stat. 993
- September 28, 2012: Continuing Appropriations Resolution, 2013, Pub. L. 112–175 (text) (PDF), 126 Stat. 1313
- November 27, 2012: Whistleblower Protection Enhancement Act of 2012, Pub. L. 112–199 (text) (PDF), 126 Stat. 1465
- December 14, 2012: Magnitsky Act, Pub. L. 112–208 (text) (PDF), 126 Stat. 1496
- January 2, 2013: American Taxpayer Relief Act of 2012, Pub. L. 112–240 (text) (PDF), 126 Stat. 2313

== 113th United States Congress ==
- March 7, 2013: Violence Against Women Reauthorization Act of 2013, Pub. L. 113–4 (text) (PDF), 127 Stat. 54
- March 13, 2013: Pandemic and All-Hazards Preparedness Reauthorization Act of 2013, Pub. L. 113–5 (text) (PDF), 127 Stat. 161
- March 26, 2013: Consolidated and Further Continuing Appropriations Act, 2013, Pub. L. 113–6 (text) (PDF), 127 Stat. 198
- June 3, 2013: Stolen Valor Act of 2013, Pub. L. 113–12 (text) (PDF), 127 Stat. 448
- August 9, 2013: Hydropower Regulatory Efficiency Act of 2013, Pub. L. 113–23 (text) (PDF), 127 Stat. 493
- August 9, 2013: Bipartisan Student Loan Certainty Act of 2013, Pub. L. 113–28 (text) (PDF), 127 Stat. 506
- September 30, 2013: Pay Our Military Act, Pub. L. 113–39 (text) (PDF), 127 Stat. 532
- November 27, 2013: Drug Quality and Security Act, Pub. L. 113–54 (text) (PDF), 127 Stat. 587
- December 26, 2013: National Defense Authorization Act for Fiscal Year 2014, Pub. L. 113–66 (text) (PDF), 127 Stat. 672
- January 17, 2014: Consolidated Appropriations Act, 2014, Pub. L. 113–76 (text) (PDF), 128 Stat. 5
- February 7, 2014: Agricultural Act of 2014, Pub. L. 113–79 (text) (PDF), 128 Stat. 649
- March 21, 2014: Homeowner Flood Insurance Affordability Act of 2014, Pub. L. 113–89 (text) (PDF), 128 Stat. 1020
- April 3, 2014: Gabriella Miller Kids First Research Act, Pub. L. 113–94 (text) (PDF), 128 Stat. 1085
- April 3, 2014: Support for the Sovereignty, Integrity, Democracy, and Economic Stability of Ukraine Act of 2014, Pub. L. 113–95 (text) (PDF), 128 Stat. 1088
- May 9, 2014: Digital Accountability and Transparency Act of 2014 (DATA), Pub. L. 113–101 (text) (PDF), 128 Stat. 1146
- May 20, 2014: Kilah Davenport Child Protection Act of 2013, Pub. L. 113–104 (text) (PDF), 128 Stat. 1156
- June 10, 2014: Water Resources Reform and Development Act of 2013, Pub. L. 113–121 (text) (PDF), 128 Stat. 1193
- July 23, 2014: Workforce Innovation and Opportunity Act, Pub. L. 113–128 (text) (PDF), 128 Stat. 1425
- August 1, 2014: Unlocking Consumer Choice and Wireless Competition Act, Pub. L. 113–144 (text) (PDF), 128 Stat. 1751
- August 7, 2014: Veterans' Access to Care through Choice, Accountability, and Transparency Act of 2014, Pub. L. 113–146 (text) (PDF), 128 Stat. 1754
- September 29, 2014: Preventing Sex Trafficking and Strengthening Families Act, Pub. L. 113–183 (text) (PDF), 128 Stat. 1919
- October 6, 2014: IMPACT Act of 2014, Pub. L. 113–185 (text) (PDF), 128 Stat. 1952
- November 26, 2014: Presidential and Federal Records Act Amendments of 2014, Pub. L. 113–187 (text) (PDF), 128 Stat. 2003
- November 26, 2014: Government Reports Elimination Act of 2014, Pub. L. 113–188 (text) (PDF), 128 Stat. 2016
- December 18, 2014: Death in Custody Reporting Act of 2013, Pub. L. 113–242 (text) (PDF), 128 Stat. 2860
- December 18, 2014: Transportation Security Acquisition Reform Act, Pub. L. 113–245 (text) (PDF), 128 Stat. 2871
- December 18, 2014: American Savings Promotion Act, Pub. L. 113–251 (text) (PDF), 128 Stat. 2888
- December 18, 2014: Credit Union Share Insurance Fund Parity Act, Pub. L. 113–252 (text) (PDF), 128 Stat. 2893
- December 18, 2014: EPS Service Parts Act of 2014 Pub. L. 113–263 (text) (PDF), 128 Stat. 2937
- December 18, 2014: Ukraine Freedom Support Act of 2014, Pub. L. 113–272 (text) (PDF), 128 Stat. 2952
- December 18, 2014: Venezuela Defense of Human Rights and Civil Society Act of 2014, Pub. L. 113–278 (text) (PDF), 128 Stat. 3011
- December 18, 2014: Insurance Capital Standards Clarification Act of 2014, Pub. L. 113–279 (text) (PDF), 128 Stat. 3017

== 114th United States Congress ==
- January 12, 2015: Terrorism Risk Insurance Program Reauthorization Act of 2015, Pub. L. 114–1 (text) (PDF)
- April 16, 2015: Medicare Access and CHIP Reauthorization Act of 2015, Pub. L. 114–10 (text) (PDF)
- May 22, 2015: Iran Nuclear Agreement Review Act of 2015, Pub. L. 114–17 (text) (PDF)
- June 2, 2015: USA Freedom Act (Uniting and Strengthening America by Fulfilling Rights and Ensuring Effective Discipline Over Monitoring Act of 2015), Pub. L. 114–23 (text) (PDF)
- June 29, 2015: Trade Preferences Extension Act of 2015, Pub. L. 114–27 (text) (PDF)
- July 6, 2015: Department of Homeland Security Interoperable Communications Act, Pub. L. 114–29 (text) (PDF)
- November 2, 2015: Bipartisan Budget Act of 2015, Pub. L. 114–74 (text) (PDF)
- November 5, 2015: Librarian of Congress Succession Modernization Act of 2015, Pub. L. 114–86 (text) (PDF)
- November 25, 2015: SPACE Act of 2015, Pub. L. 114–90 (text) (PDF)
- December 4, 2015: Fixing America's Surface Transportation (FAST) Act, Pub. L. 114–94 (text) (PDF)
- December 10, 2015: Every Student Succeeds Act, Pub. L. 114–95 (text) (PDF)
- December 18, 2015: Consolidated Appropriations Act, 2016, Pub. L. 114–113 (text) (PDF)
- February 8, 2016: Coast Guard Authorization Act of 2015, Pub. L. 114–120 (text) (PDF)
- February 24, 2016: Internet Tax Freedom Act contained in Trade Facilitation and Trade Enforcement Act of 2015, Pub. L. 114–125 (text) (PDF)
- May 11, 2016: Defend Trade Secrets Act, Pub. L. 114–153 (text) (PDF)
- June 30, 2016: PROMESA (Puerto Rico Oversight, Management, and Economic Stability Act), Pub. L. 114–187 (text) (PDF)
- July 20, 2016: Global Food Security Act of 2016, Pub. L. 114–195 (text) (PDF)
- September 28, 2016: Justice Against Sponsors of Terrorism Act, Pub. L. 114–222 (text) (PDF)
- October 7, 2016: Sexual Assault Survivors’ Rights Act, Pub. L. 114–236 (text) (PDF)
- December 13, 2016: 21st Century Cures Act, Pub. L. 114–255 (text) (PDF)

== 115th United States Congress ==
- May 5, 2017: Consolidated Appropriations Act, 2017, Pub. L. 115–31 (text) (PDF)
- August 2, 2017: Countering America’s Adversaries Through Sanctions Act, Pub. L. 115–44 (text) (PDF)
- December 12, 2017: National Defense Authorization Act for Fiscal Year 2018, Pub. L. 115–91 (text) (PDF)
- December 22, 2017: Tax Cuts and Jobs Act of 2017, Pub. L. 115–97 (text) (PDF)
- February 9, 2018: Bipartisan Budget Act of 2018, Pub. L. 115–123 (text) (PDF)
- March 23, 2018: Consolidated Appropriations Act, 2018, Pub. L. 115–141 (text) (PDF)
- April 11, 2018: Stop Enabling Sex Traffickers Act, Pub. L. 115–164 (text) (PDF)
- May 24, 2018: Economic Growth, Regulatory Relief and Consumer Protection Act, Pub. L. 115–174 (text) (PDF)
- May 30, 2018: Trickett Wendler, Frank Mongiello, Jordan McLinn, and Matthew Bellina Right to Try Act of 2017, Pub. L. 115–176 (text) (PDF)
- August 13, 2018: John S. McCain National Defense Authorization Act for Fiscal Year 2019, Pub. L. 115–232 (text) (PDF)
- October 5, 2018: FAA Reauthorization Act of 2018, Pub. L. 115–254 (text) (PDF)
- October 11, 2018: Music Modernization Act, Pub. L. 115–264 (text) (PDF)
- December 20, 2018: Agriculture Improvement Act of 2018, Pub. L. 115–334 (text) (PDF)
- December 21, 2018: First Step Act, Pub. L. 115–391 (text) (PDF)

== 116th United States Congress ==
- January 16, 2019: Government Employee Fair Treatment Act of 2019, Pub. L. 116–1 (text) (PDF)
- January 25, 2019: Further Additional Continuing Appropriations Act, 2019, Pub. L. 116–5 (text) (PDF)
- February 15, 2019: Consolidated Appropriations Act, 2019, Pub. L. 116–6 (text) (PDF)
- March 12, 2019: John D. Dingell Jr. Conservation, Management, and Recreation Act, Pub. L. 116–9 (text) (PDF)
- June 24, 2019: Pandemic and All-Hazards Preparedness and Advancing Innovation Act, Pub. L. 116–22 (text) (PDF)
- July 1, 2019: Taxpayer First Act, Pub. L. 116–25 (text) (PDF)
- November 27, 2019: Hong Kong Human Rights and Democracy Act, Pub. L. 116–76 (text) (PDF)
- December 20, 2019: National Defense Authorization Act for Fiscal Year 2020, Pub. L. 116–92 (text) (PDF)
- January 29, 2020: United States–Mexico–Canada Agreement Implementation Act, Pub. L. 116–113 (text) (PDF)
- March 6, 2020: Coronavirus Preparedness and Response Supplemental Appropriations Act, 2020, Pub. L. 116–123 (text) (PDF)
- March 18, 2020: Families First Coronavirus Response Act, Pub. L. 116–127 (text) (PDF)
- March 26, 2020: Taiwan Allies International Protection and Enhancement Initiative Act (TAIPEI Act), Pub. L. 116–135 (text) (PDF)
- March 27, 2020: CARES Act (Coronavirus Aid, Relief, and Economic Security Act), Pub. L. 116–136 (text) (PDF)
- April 24, 2020: Paycheck Protection Program and Health Care Enhancement Act, Pub. L. 116–139 (text) (PDF)
- June 17, 2020: Uyghur Human Rights Policy Act, Pub. L. 116–145 (text) (PDF)
- July 14, 2020: Hong Kong Autonomy Act, Pub. L. 116–149 (text) (PDF)
- August 4, 2020: Great American Outdoors Act, Pub. L. 116–152 (text) (PDF)
- December 27, 2020: Consolidated Appropriations Act, 2021, Pub. L. 116–260 (text) (PDF)
- January 1, 2021: William M. (Mac) Thornberry National Defense Authorization Act for Fiscal Year 2021, Pub. L. 116–283 (text) (PDF)

== 117th United States Congress ==
- March 11, 2021: American Rescue Plan Act of 2021, Pub. L. 117–2 (text) (PDF)
- November 10, 2021: RENACER Act, Pub. L. 117–54 (text) (PDF)
- November 15, 2021: Infrastructure Investment and Jobs Act, Pub. L. 117–58 (text) (PDF)
- December 22, 2021: Capitol Police Emergency Assistance Act of 2021, Pub. L. 117–77 (text) (PDF)
- December 23, 2021: Uyghur Forced Labor Prevention Act, Pub. L. 117–78 (text) (PDF)
- December 27, 2021: National Defense Authorization Act for Fiscal Year 2022, Pub. L. 117–81 (text) (PDF)
- March 15, 2022: Consolidated Appropriations Act, 2022, Pub. L. 117–103 (text) (PDF)
- March 29, 2022: Emmett Till Antilynching Act, Pub. L. 117–107 (text) (PDF)
- April 6, 2022: Postal Service Reform Act of 2022, Pub. L. 117–108 (text) (PDF)
- May 9, 2022: Ukraine Democracy Defense Lend-Lease Act of 2022, Pub. L. 117–118 (text) (PDF)
- June 25, 2022: Bipartisan Safer Communities Act, Pub. L. 117–159 (text) (PDF)
- August 9, 2022: CHIPS and Science Act, Pub. L. 117–167 (text) (PDF)
- August 10, 2022: Honoring our PACT Act of 2022, Pub. L. 117–168 (text) (PDF)
- August 16, 2022: Inflation Reduction Act, Pub. L. 117–169 (text) (PDF)
- December 2, 2022: Medical Marijuana and Cannabidiol Research Expansion Act, Pub. L. 117–215 (text) (PDF)
- December 13, 2022: Respect for Marriage Act, Pub. L. 117–228 (text) (PDF)
- December 23, 2022: James M. Inhofe National Defense Authorization Act for Fiscal Year 2023, Pub. L. 117–263 (text) (PDF)
- December 29, 2022: Consolidated Appropriations Act, 2023, Pub. L. 117–328 (text) (PDF)
- January 5, 2023: Sami's Law, Pub. L. 117–330 (text) (PDF)

== 118th United States Congress ==
- March 20, 2023: COVID-19 Origin Act of 2023, Pub. L. 118–2 (text) (PDF)
- December 22, 2023: National Defense Authorization Act for Fiscal Year 2024, Pub. L. 118–31 (text) (PDF)
- April 24, 2024: Protecting Americans from Foreign Adversary Controlled Applications Act, Pub. L. 118–50 (text) (PDF)
- May 13, 2024: Prohibiting Russian Uranium Imports Act, Pub. L. 118–62 (text) (PDF)
- December 23, 2024: National Defense Authorization Act for Fiscal Year 2025, Pub. L. 118–159 (text) (PDF)
- January 5, 2025: Social Security Fairness Act, Pub. L. 118–273 (text) (PDF)

== 119th United States Congress ==
- January 29, 2025: Laken Riley Act, Pub. L. 119–1 (text) (PDF)
- July 4, 2025: One Big Beautiful Bill Act, Pub. L. 119–21 (text) (PDF)
- July 18, 2025: GENIUS Act, Pub. L. 119–27 (text) (PDF)
- July 24, 2025: Rescissions Act of 2025, Pub. L. 119–28 (text) (PDF)
- November 19, 2025: Epstein Files Transparency Act
- December 18, 2025: National Defense Authorization Act for Fiscal Year 2026
- July 12, 2026: 21st Century ROAD to Housing Act
- September 18, 2026: Lindsey O. Graham Sanctioning Russia and Iran Act of 2026
