= Lists of United States federal legislation =

This is a chronological, but still incomplete, list of United States federal legislation. Congress has enacted approximately 200–600 statutes during each of its 119 biennial terms so more than 30,000 statutes have been enacted since 1789.

At the federal level in the United States, legislation (i.e., "statutes" or "statutory law") consists exclusively of Acts passed by the Congress of the United States and its predecessor, the Continental Congress, that were either signed into law by the President or passed by Congress after a presidential veto. Legislation is not the only source of regulations with the force of law. However, most executive branch and judicial branch regulations must originate in a congressional grant of power. See also: Executive orders issued by the President; Code of Federal Regulations for rules issued by executive branch departments and administrative agencies; and the Federal Rules of Civil Procedure of the federal courts.

== Publication of the law ==
=== Statutes at Large (Stat.) ===
Acts of Congress are published in the United States Statutes at Large. Volumes 1 through 18, which have all the statutes passed from 1789 to 1875, are available online at the Library of Congress, here. In the list below, statutes are listed by X Stat. Y, where X is the volume of the Statutes at Large and Y is the page number, as well as either the chapter or Public Law number. See examples below.

=== Sessions (Sess.) and Chapters (ch.) ===
Each Congress has two to four sessions. Under the numbering system used from 1789 until 1957, the Acts in each session are numbered sequentially as Chapters. This numbering included both laws applicable to the general public and laws relating to specific individuals, e.g., to grant pensions to disabled veterans.

=== Examples ===
- The Militia Act of 1862 of July 17, 1862, Sess. 2, ch. 201, was the 201st Act of the second session of the 37th Congress.
- The National Banking Act of February 25, 1863, Sess. 3, ch. 58, was the 58th Act of the third session of the 37th Congress.
- The Global Anti-Semitism Review Act of 2004 of October 16, 2004, Pub. L. 108–332 (text) (PDF), 118 Stat. 1282, was the 332nd Act of Congress (statute) passed in the 108th Congress. It can be found in volume 118 of the U.S. Statutes at Large, starting at page 1282.
- The Help America Vote Act of October 29, 2002, Pub. L. 107–252 (text) (PDF), 116 Stat. 1666, was the 252nd Act of the 107th Congress. It can be found in volume 116 of the U.S. Statutes at Large, starting at page 1666.

== Congress of the Confederation ==
- September 22, 1783: Confederation Congress Proclamation of 1783
- April 23, 1784: Land Ordinance of 1784
- May 21, 1785: Land Ordinance of 1785
- July 13, 1787: Ordinance of 1787: The Northwest Territorial Government ("Northwest Ordinance")

== United States Congress ==
=== 1789 to 1901: 1st through 56th Congresses ===
Start date	End date	List of enacted legislation	Public laws	Private laws
1789-03-04	1791-03-03	List of acts of the 1st United States Congress	94	0
1791-03-04	1793-03-03	List of acts of the 2nd United States Congress	62	0
1793-03-04	1795-03-03	List of acts of the 3rd United States Congress		
1795-03-04	1797-03-03	List of acts of the 4th United States Congress		
1797-03-04	1799-03-03	List of acts of the 5th United States Congress		
1799-03-04	1801-03-03	List of acts of the 6th United States Congress		
1801-03-04	1803-03-03	List of acts of the 7th United States Congress		
1803-03-04	1805-03-03	List of acts of the 8th United States Congress		
1805-03-04	1807-03-03	List of acts of the 9th United States Congress		
1807-03-04	1809-03-03	List of acts of the 10th United States Congress		
1809-03-04	1811-03-03	List of acts of the 11th United States Congress		
1811-03-04	1813-03-03	List of acts of the 12th United States Congress		
1813-03-04	1815-03-03	List of acts of the 13th United States Congress		
1815-03-04	1817-03-03	List of acts of the 14th United States Congress		
1817-03-04	1819-03-03	List of acts of the 15th United States Congress		
1819-03-04	1821-03-03	List of acts of the 16th United States Congress		
1821-03-04	1823-03-03	List of acts of the 17th United States Congress		
1823-03-04	1825-03-03	List of acts of the 18th United States Congress		
1825-03-04	1827-03-03	List of acts of the 19th United States Congress		
1827-03-04	1829-03-03	List of acts of the 20th United States Congress		
1829-03-04	1831-03-03	List of acts of the 21st United States Congress		
1831-03-04	1833-03-03	List of acts of the 22nd United States Congress		
1833-03-04	1835-03-03	List of acts of the 23rd United States Congress		
1835-03-04	1837-03-03	List of acts of the 24th United States Congress		
1837-03-04	1839-03-03	List of acts of the 25th United States Congress		
1839-03-04	1841-03-03	List of acts of the 26th United States Congress		
1841-03-04	1843-03-03	List of acts of the 27th United States Congress		
1843-03-04	1845-03-03	List of acts of the 28th United States Congress		
1845-03-04	1847-03-03	List of acts of the 29th United States Congress		
1847-04-04	1849-03-03	List of acts of the 30th United States Congress		
1849-03-04	1851-03-03	List of acts of the 31st United States Congress		
1851-03-04	1853-03-03	List of acts of the 32nd United States Congress		
1853-03-04	1855-03-03	List of acts of the 33rd United States Congress		
1855-03-04	1857-03-03	List of acts of the 34th United States Congress		
1857-03-04	1859-03-03	List of acts of the 35th United States Congress		
1859-03-04	1861-03-03	List of acts of the 36th United States Congress		
1861-03-04	1863-03-03	List of acts of the 37th United States Congress		
1863-03-04	1865-03-03	List of acts of the 38th United States Congress		
1865-03-04	1867-03-03	List of acts of the 39th United States Congress		
1867-03-04	1869-03-03	List of acts of the 40th United States Congress		
1869-03-04	1871-03-03	List of acts of the 41st United States Congress		
1871-03-04	1873-03-03	List of acts of the 42nd United States Congress		
1873-03-04	1875-03-03	List of acts of the 43rd United States Congress		
1875-03-04	1877-03-03	List of acts of the 44th United States Congress	277	301
1877-03-04	1879-03-03	List of acts of the 45th United States Congress	303	443
1879-03-04	1881-03-03	List of acts of the 46th United States Congress		
1881-03-04	1883-03-03	List of acts of the 47th United States Congress		
1883-03-04	1885-03-03	List of acts of the 48th United States Congress		
1885-03-04	1887-03-03	List of acts of the 49th United States Congress		
1887-03-04	1889-03-03	List of acts of the 50th United States Congress		
1889-03-04	1891-03-03	List of acts of the 51st United States Congress		
1891-03-04	1893-03-03	List of acts of the 52nd United States Congress		
1893-03-04	1895-03-03	List of acts of the 53rd United States Congress		
1895-03-04	1897-03-03	List of acts of the 54th United States Congress		
1897-03-04	1899-03-03	List of acts of the 55th United States Congress		
1899-03-04	1901-03-03	List of acts of the 56th United States Congress		

=== 1901 to 2001: 57th through 106th Congresses ===
Start date	End date	List of enacted legislation	Public laws	Private laws
1901-03-04	1903-03-04	List of acts of the 57th United States Congress		
1903-03-04	1905-03-04	List of acts of the 58th United States Congress		
1905-03-04	1907-03-04	List of acts of the 59th United States Congress		
1907-03-04	1909-03-04	List of acts of the 60th United States Congress		
1909-03-04	1911-03-04	List of acts of the 61st United States Congress		
1911-03-04	1913-03-04	List of acts of the 62nd United States Congress		
1913-03-04	1915-03-04	List of acts of the 63rd United States Congress		
1915-03-04	1917-03-04	List of acts of the 64th United States Congress		
1917-03-04	1919-03-04	List of acts of the 65th United States Congress		
1919-03-04	1921-03-04	List of acts of the 66th United States Congress		
1921-03-04	1923-03-04	List of acts of the 67th United States Congress		
1923-03-04	1925-03-04	List of acts of the 68th United States Congress		
1925-03-04	1927-03-04	List of acts of the 69th United States Congress		
1927-03-04	1929-03-04	List of acts of the 70th United States Congress		
1929-03-04	1931-03-04	List of acts of the 71st United States Congress		
1931-03-04	1933-03-04	List of acts of the 72nd United States Congress		
1933-03-04	1935-01-03	List of acts of the 73rd United States Congress		
1935-01-03	1937-01-03	List of acts of the 74th United States Congress	849	730
1937-01-03	1939-01-03	List of acts of the 75th United States Congress	788	835
1939-01-03	1941-01-03	List of acts of the 76th United States Congress	894	651
1941-01-03	1943-01-03	List of acts of the 77th United States Congress	850	635
1943-01-03	1945-01-03	List of acts of the 78th United States Congress	568	589
1945-01-03	1947-01-03	List of acts of the 79th United States Congress	734	892
1947-01-03	1949-01-03	List of acts of the 80th United States Congress	906	457
1949-01-03	1951-01-03	List of acts of the 81st United States Congress	921	1103
1951-01-03	1953-01-03	List of acts of the 82nd United States Congress	594	1023
1953-01-03	1955-01-03	List of acts of the 83rd United States Congress	781	1002
1955-01-03	1957-01-03	List of acts of the 84th United States Congress	1028	893
1957-01-03	1959-01-03	List of acts of the 85th United States Congress	936	784
1959-01-03	1961-01-03	List of acts of the 86th United States Congress	800	492
1961-01-03	1963-01-03	List of acts of the 87th United States Congress	885	684
1963-01-03	1965-01-03	List of acts of the 88th United States Congress	666	360
1965-01-03	1967-01-03	List of acts of the 89th United States Congress	810	473
1967-01-03	1969-01-03	List of acts of the 90th United States Congress	640	362
1969-01-03	1971-01-03	List of acts of the 91st United States Congress	695	246
1971-01-03	1973-01-03	List of acts of the 92nd United States Congress	607	161
1973-01-03	1975-01-03	List of acts of the 93rd United States Congress	649	123
1975-01-03	1977-01-03	List of acts of the 94th United States Congress	588	141
1977-01-03	1979-01-03	List of acts of the 95th United States Congress	633	170
1979-01-03	1981-01-03	List of acts of the 96th United States Congress	613	123
1981-01-03	1983-01-03	List of acts of the 97th United States Congress	473	56
1983-01-03	1985-01-03	List of acts of the 98th United States Congress	623	54
1985-01-03	1987-01-03	List of acts of the 99th United States Congress	664	24
1987-01-03	1989-01-03	List of acts of the 100th United States Congress	713	48
1989-01-03	1991-01-03	List of acts of the 101st United States Congress	650	16
1991-01-03	1993-01-03	List of acts of the 102nd United States Congress	590	20
1993-01-03	1995-01-03	List of acts of the 103rd United States Congress	465	8
1995-01-03	1997-01-03	List of acts of the 104th United States Congress	333	4
1997-01-03	1999-01-03	List of acts of the 105th United States Congress	394	10
1999-01-03	2001-01-03	List of acts of the 106th United States Congress	580	24

=== 2001 to present: 107th and subsequent Congresses ===
Start date	End date	List of enacted legislation	Public laws	Private laws
2001-01-03	2003-01-03	List of acts of the 107th United States Congress	377	6
2003-01-03	2005-01-03	List of acts of the 108th United States Congress	498	6
2005-01-03	2007-01-03	List of acts of the 109th United States Congress	482	1
2007-01-03	2009-01-03	List of acts of the 110th United States Congress	460	0
2009-01-03	2011-01-03	List of acts of the 111th United States Congress	383	2
2011-01-03	2013-01-03	List of acts of the 112th United States Congress	283	1
2013-01-03	2015-01-03	List of acts of the 113th United States Congress	296	0
2015-01-03	2017-01-03	List of acts of the 114th United States Congress	329	0
2017-01-03	2019-01-03	List of acts of the 115th United States Congress	442	1
2019-01-03	2021-01-03	List of acts of the 116th United States Congress	344	0
2021-01-03	2023-01-03	List of acts of the 117th United States Congress	362	3
2023-01-03	2025-01-03	List of acts of the 118th United States Congress	274	0
2025-01-03	2027-01-03	List of acts of the 119th United States Congress	102	2

== See also ==
- Authorization bill
- Appropriations bill (United States)
- List of sources of law in the United States
- List of Uniform Acts (United States)
- Lists by subject
  - Agriculture: United States Department of Agriculture#Related legislation
  - Civil Rights: Civil Rights Act (disambiguation)
  - Defense: United States Department of Defense#Related legislation
  - Drugs: Office of National Drug Control Policy#Legislation and executive orders
  - Energy: United States Department of Energy#Related legislation and Energy law#Federal laws
  - Environment: United States Environmental Protection Agency#Related legislation
  - Health and Human Services: United States Department of Health and Human Services#Related legislation
  - Judiciary: Judiciary Act (disambiguation)
  - Labor: United States Department of Labor#Related legislation
  - Slavery: Slave Trade Acts
  - Social Security: List of Social Security legislation (United States)
  - Taxation: List of tariffs, Template:US tax acts, and Category:United States federal taxation legislation
  - Transportation: United States Department of Transportation#Related legislation
  - Veterans Affairs: United States Department of Veterans Affairs#Related legislation
  - Water Resources, Navigation, Environmental Regulation: United States Army Corps of Engineers#Public Laws affecting the Corps of Engineers (partial)

== Sources ==
- Acts listed by popular name, via Cornell University
- Statutes at Large
  - Volumes 1 through 18, 1789–1875, via Library of Congress
  - Volumes 19 through 64, 1875-1950, via Library of Congress
  - "Volumes 65 through 127, 1951-2013". Government Publishing Office.
- Public laws
  - 93rd Congress through current Congress, via Congress.gov
- U.S. Code
  - U.S. Code, via Law Revision Counsel of the U.S. House of Representatives
  - U.S. Code, via Cornell University
  - "U.S. Code". U.S. Government Publishing Office.
  - U.S. Code, via FindLaw.com
- Brian K. Landsberg (ed), Major Acts of Congress. MacMillan Reference Books (December 2003) ISBN 0-02-865749-7
