= Public Credit Act of 1869 =

US federal legislation

- Other short titles: Act to Strengthen the Public Credit · Act of March 18, 1869
- Long title: An Act to strengthen the public credit.
- Enacted by: the 41st United States Congress
- Effective: March 18, 1869

Citations
- Public law: Chapter 1
- Statutes at Large: 16 Stat. 1

Legislative history
- Introduced in the House as H.R. 7 by R‑OH Robert C. Schenckth on March 12, 1869; Committee consideration by House Committee on Ways and Means; Passed the House on March 12, 1869 (97–47); Passed the Senate as the S. 56 on March 15, 1869 (42–13); Signed into law by President Ulysses S. Grant on March 18, 1869

Major amendments
- Specie Payment Resumption Act (1875)

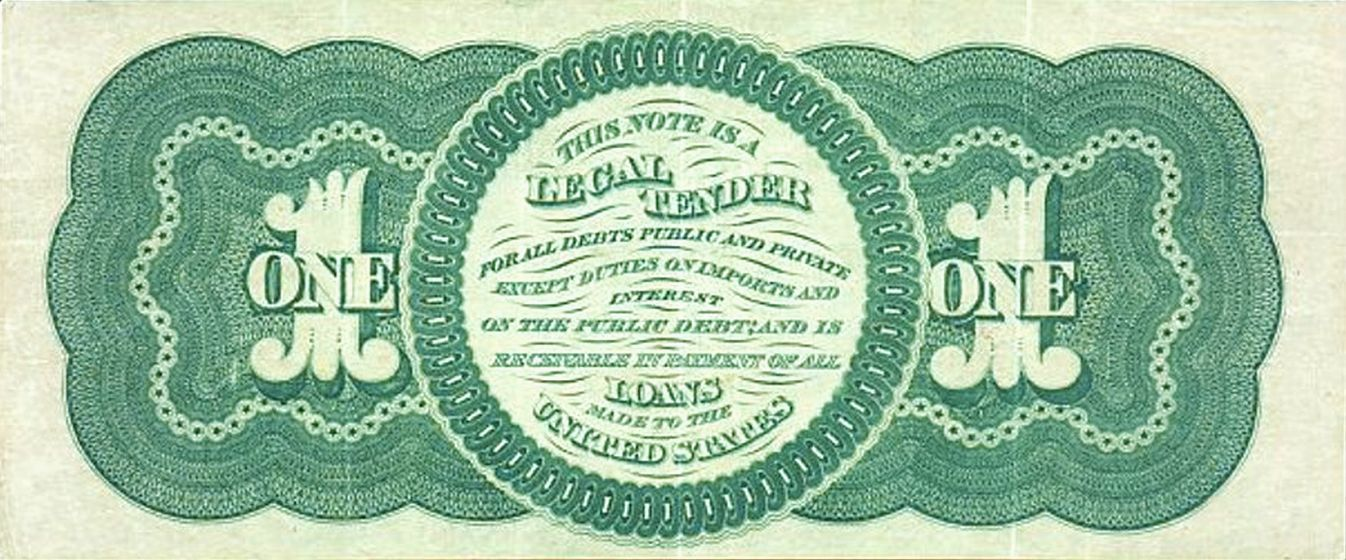
Image of one dollar "Greenback", first issued in 1862

The Public Credit Act of 1869 in the USA states that bondholders who purchased bonds to help finance the Civil War (1861 – 1865) would be paid back in gold. The act was signed on March 18, 1869, and was mainly supported by the Republican Party, notably Senator John Sherman.

== Background ==
Prior to the Civil War, the U.S. operated on a gold standard in practice. Bank notes were legal tender issued by state banks which could be exchanged for an amount of gold at any bank. Both gold and bank notes circulated as mediums of exchange. On February 25, 1862, the U.S. passed the First Legal Tender Act to help finance the Civil War. The act changed the economy to a fiduciary standard based on a fiat currency called United States Notes, or more popularly, greenbacks. Unlike bank notes, greenbacks were not backed by any metallic standard and functioned as a "loan without interest." Greenbacks were issued as an immediate, short-term relief for the country's growing demand for currency. The issuance of greenbacks and the sale of government bonds to finance the war were led by the Secretary of the Treasury at the time, Salmon P. Chase. Until 1879, gold, bank notes, and greenbacks were used as mediums of exchange and had free floating exchange rates.

After the Civil War, there was debate over whether to keep the greenback standard or to revert to the gold standard. During the Civil War, the nation experienced a strong period of inflation. The price level in the U.S. almost doubled between 1861 and 1865, with harmful implications on the exchange rate. Inflation increased the exchange rate with England, making the price of British pounds more expensive. There was concern that if the pre-war gold standard was put in place during this inflationary period, people would cash out their U.S. currency for gold to buy British goods. The flow of gold out of the country would slow the economy and lead to unemployment.

Some Republicans pushed for a gold standard early on. They believed that creditors who supported the war should be paid back in gold, the way they were expected to be paid back. The Republicans also believed that the government should not be in charge of managing currency and that the gold standard did not allow government to intervene in the economy. It was thought by all that the gold standard would also be a good move from an international perspective, since the U.S. would appear stable, and its system would be compatible with its major trading partner, England, who also operated on a gold standard.

== Consequences ==
Over time, the price level and exchange rate began to fall. Congress decided on a severe monetary contraction to lower the price level so they could reinstate the gold standard during the Contraction Act of 1866 before easing the policy in 1868. The passing of the Public Credit Act of 1869 was the first definitive piece of legislation that moved the U.S. toward reinstating a gold standard. However, the act included no explicit dates, people, or actions intended to pay back the bondholders in gold. The U.S. did not officially operate on the gold standard again until the Resumption Act of 1875.

== See also ==
- Contraction Act of 1866
- John Sherman
- Gold Standard
- Salmon P. Chase
- Resumption Act
