= Contraction Act of 1866 =

American act of Congress

The Contraction Act of 1866 was an act passed by Congress of the United States on April 12, 1866. It was intended to lower the price level so they could reinstate the gold standard.

== History ==
In 1862, Abraham Lincoln created the Greenbacks, a currency of free money issued by the United States of America between 1861 and 1865. The currency was not based in gold and was not created by private banks.

Greenbacks were paper currency (printed in green on the back) issued by the United States during the American Civil War. They took two forms: Demand Notes, issued in July 1861 (Congress authorized $50,000,000 in Demand Notes) and United States Notes issued between 1862 and 1865.

Eleven months after the assassination of Abraham Lincoln - which took place on April 14, 1865 - Congress passed the Contraction Act to lower the price level so they could instate a gold standard.

== See also ==
- Greenback (1860s money)
- Coinage Act of 1873
- Demand Note
- United States Note
- Public Credit Act of 1869
- John Sherman, who was the biggest proponent of this act, and was the Secretary of Treasury when this was passed
- Gold Standard
- Salmon P. Chase
- Resumption Act
