= Judiciary Act =

The term Judiciary Act may refer to any of several statutes relating to the organization of national court systems:

== Australia ==
- Judiciary Act 1903

== United States ==
- Judiciary Act of 1789, established the federal judiciary.
- Judiciary Act of 1801, also called the Midnight Judges Act
- Judiciary Act of 1802, repealed the 1801 Act
- Judiciary Act of 1866, gradually reduced circuit and Supreme Court seats
- Judiciary Act of 1867, also called the Habeas Corpus Act of 1867, amended sec. 25 of the Act of 1789 regarding Supreme Court review of state court rulings
- Judiciary Act of 1869, also called the Circuit Judges Act of 1869
- Judiciary Act of 1891, also called the Evarts Act or the Circuit Courts of Appeals Act
- Judiciary Act of 1925, also called the Certiorari Act or the Judges' Bill
- Judiciary Act of 2021, proposal to increase the Supreme Court from nine to 13 members. See Supreme Court of the United States#Size of the court.
