= List of acts of the 74th United States Congress =

The list of acts of the 74th United States Congress includes all Acts of Congress and ratified treaties by the 74th United States Congress, which lasted from January 3, 1935, to January 3, 1937.

Acts include public and private laws, which are enacted after being passed by Congress and signed by the President, however if the President vetoes a bill it can still be enacted by a two-thirds vote in both houses. The Senate alone considers treaties, which are ratified by a two-thirds vote.

== Public laws ==
The 74th congress passed 849 Public Laws:

Public law number (Linked to Wikisource)	Date of enactment	Short title	Long title	Link to Legislink.org
74-1	January 31, 1935	(No short title)	To extend the functions of the Reconstruction Finance Corporation for two years, and for other purposes.	Pub. L. 74–1
74-2	February 2, 1935	(No short title)	Making appropriations for the Executive Office and sundry independent executive bureaus, boards, commissions, and offices for the fiscal year ending June 30, 1936, and for other purposes.	Pub. L. 74–2
74-3	February 4, 1935	(No short title)	To amend the Second Liberty Bond Act, as amended, and for other purposes.	Pub. L. 74–3
74-4	February 18, 1935	(No short title)	Granting the consent of Congress to the State highway commission to construct, maintain, and operate a free highway bridge across Eleven Points River in section 17, township 23 north, range 2 west, approximately twelve miles east of Alton, on route numbered 42, Oregon County, Missouri.	Pub. L. 74–4
74-5	February 18, 1935	(No short title)	Granting the consent of Congress to the State of Oklahoma to construct, maintain, and operate a free highway bridge across the Arkansas River south of the town of Sallisaw in Sequoyah and Le Flore Counties at a point approximately fifteen miles north of Keota in the State of Oklahoma.	Pub. L. 74–5
74-6	February 18, 1935	(No short title)	Permitting the laying of pipe lines across New York Avenue Northeast, in the District of Columbia	Pub. L. 74–6
74-7	February 18, 1935	(No short title)	To extend the times for commencing and completing the construction of a bridge across the Waccamaw River at Conway, South Carolina.	Pub. L. 74–7
74-8	February 18, 1935	(No short title)	To legalize a bridge (known as "Union Street Bridge") across the Dan River at Danville, Virginia.	Pub. L. 74–8
74-9	February 19, 1935	(No short title)	Authorizing the States of Washington and Idaho to construct, maintain, and operate a free highway bridge across the Snake River between Clarkston, Washington, and Lewiston, Idaho.	Pub. L. 74–9
74-10	February 20, 1935	(No short title)	To extend the times for commencing and completing the construction of a bridge across the Saint Lawrence River at or near Alexandria Bay, New York.	Pub. L. 74–10
74-11	February 20, 1935	(No short title)	To provide for loans to farmers for crop production and harvesting during the year 1935, and for other purposes.	Pub. L. 74–11
74-12	February 21, 1935	(No short title)	To postpone the effective date of certain restrictions respecting air-mail contracts.	Pub. L. 74–12
74-13	February 21, 1935	(No short title)	To further extend the time for constructing abridge across the Missouri River at or near Saint Charles, Missouri.	Pub. L. 74–13
74-14	February 22, 1935	Connally Hot Oil Act of 1935	To regulate interstate and foreign commerce in petroleum and its products by prohibiting the shipment in such commerce of petroleum and its products produced in violation of State law, and for other purposes.	Pub. L. 74–14
74-15	March 2, 1935	(No short title)	To extend the times for commencing and completing the construction of a bridge across the Ohio River between Rockport, Indiana, and Owensboro, Kentucky.	Pub. L. 74–15

== Private laws ==
The 74th congress passed 704 private laws.
