= Seamen's Protection Act =

4th United States Congress
- Long title: An Act for the Relief and Protection of American Seamen
- Enacted by: 4th United States Congress
- Enacted: May 28, 1796

Legislative history
- Bill title: 1 Stat. 477
- Status: Unknown

The Seamen's Protection Act (1 Stat. 477), also known as the Act for the Relief and Protection of American Seamen, was a piece of legislation passed by the 4th United States Congress on May 28, 1796. The act was primarily designed to combat the impressment of American sailors by the British Royal Navy during the French Revolutionary Wars.

While the act was intended to protect all American mariners, it became a landmark piece of legislation for African American sailors, as it provided a federal mechanism for them to secure "Seamen's Protection Certificates," which served as a de facto recognition of their citizenship and freedom on the high seas.

== Historical background ==
In the late 18th century, the British Royal Navy frequently boarded American merchant vessels to search for British subjects to press into naval service. Due to shared language and physical similarities, American-born sailors were often seized and forced into service against their will. The United States government, lacking a navy capable of challenging British hegemony, sought a bureaucratic solution to identify and protect its citizens through the issuance of formal "Protections."

== The Protection Certificate ==
Under the Act, customs collectors in American ports were authorized to issue certificates to sailors who could provide proof of their citizenship. These documents included the sailor's name, age, place of birth, and a detailed physical description.

For Black sailors, these certificates were particularly vital. At a time when the United States Supreme Court had not yet clarified the citizenship status of African Americans (later denied in the 1857 Dred Scott v. Sandford decision), these certificates represented a rare federal acknowledgment of their right to protection as Americans.

== Physical descriptions and racial categorization ==
Because the certificates predated photography, they relied on meticulous physical descriptions to verify identity. These logs provide a rare historical window into how 18th and 19th-century officials categorized race and ethnicity.

=== Taxonomy of complexion ===
Customs officials used a standardized but subjective vocabulary to describe the "complexion" of mariners. These terms often served as a proxy for racial identity:

- "Black" or "Negro": Generally used for sailors of full African descent.
- "Mulatto": Used for sailors of mixed African and European heritage.
- "Yellow" or "Copper": Often applied to light-skinned Black sailors or those of Native American descent.
- "Swarthy": Frequently used for Southern Europeans (such as Portuguese or Italian sailors) or white sailors with significant sun exposure.

=== Biometric markers ===
In addition to complexion, officials recorded distinguishing features such as "woolley hair," "thick lips," or "strait hair." They also noted "scars of the smallpox" or tattoos, which were common among sailors and served as unique identifiers to prevent the illegal sale or transfer of certificates between mariners.

== Port demographic comparison (1796–1815) ==
The following table compares the issuance of certificates in major Northern ports during the height of the Napoleonic Wars.

Registration Data by Port
Port city	Est. total certificates	% of Black applicants	Primary trade routes
Philadelphia	15,000+	14–20%	West Indies, Coastal trade
Salem	6,000+	3–7%	East Indies, China, Whaling
Baltimore	8,000+	10–15%	Chesapeake Bay, Caribbean
Newport	3,500+	12–18%	Coastal, Atlantic trade

== Impact and Legacy ==
- Proof of Freedom: In Southern ports, a Seamen's Protection Certificate often served as the only evidence a free Black man had to avoid being claimed as a runaway slave.
- Decline: The transition to steam power and the rise of Jim Crow laws eventually eroded these protections. The Negro Seamen Acts in the Southern U.S. frequently overrode federal protections, leading to the imprisonment of Black sailors regardless of their documentation.

== See also ==
- Impressment
- Maritime history of the United States
- Black sailors in the Age of Sail
- War of 1812
