= Medal of Sacrifice =

United States award for deceased first responders and law enforcement officers

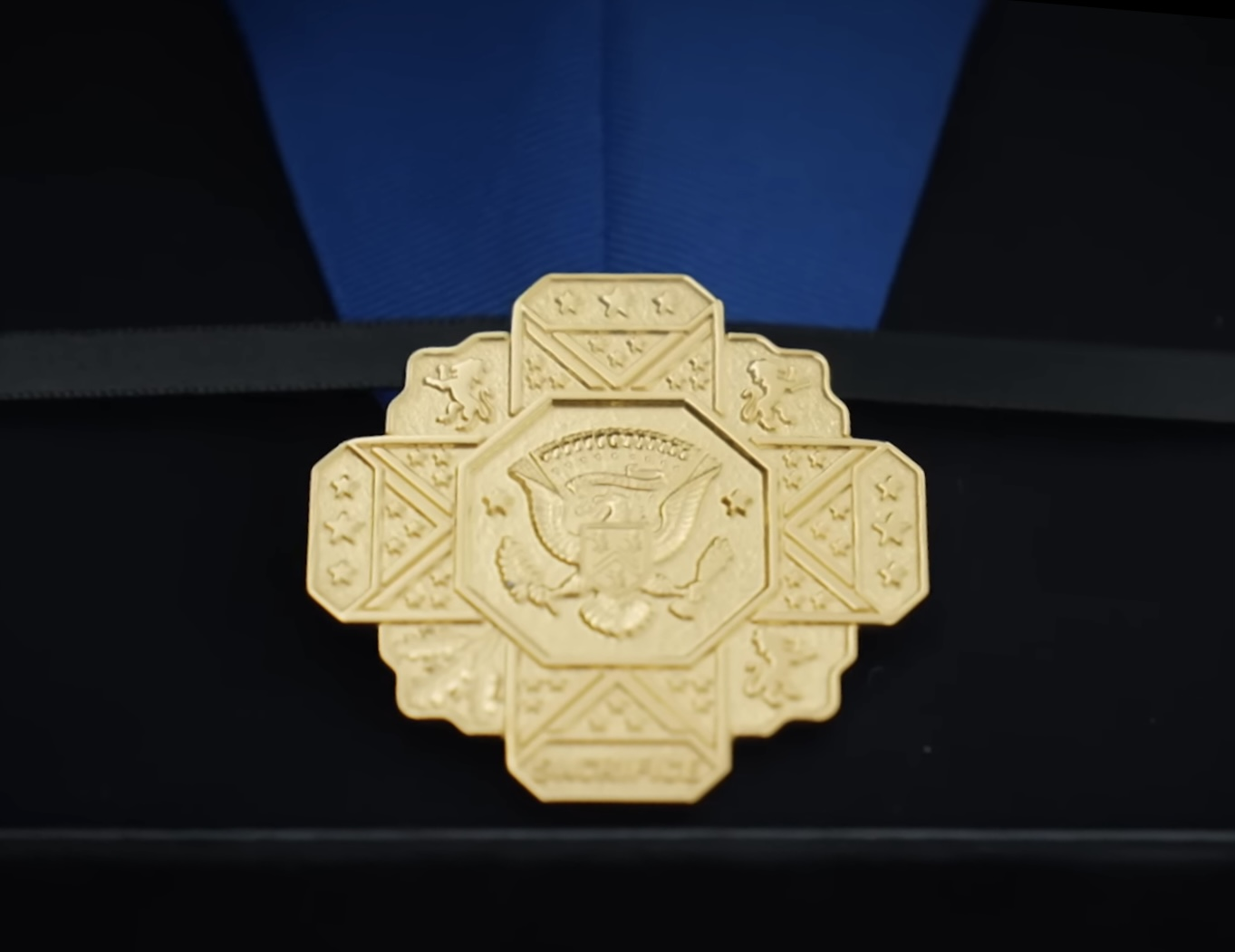
- Medal of Sacrifice for law enforcement officers
- Presented by: The president of the United States
- Eligibility: Local, state, or federal law enforcement officers and first responders killed in the line of duty
- Status: Currently awarded
- First award: May 19, 2025

Highlights
- Total recipients: 3

The Medal of Sacrifice is a United States award that recognizes law enforcement officers and first responders killed in the line of duty. The medal is presented to the recipient's family by the president of the United States.

== History ==
On May 19, 2025, Representative Brian Mast introduced H.R. 3497, the Medal of Sacrifice Act, in the House of Representatives. Later that day, Mast and President Donald Trump presented the medal to the families of three Palm Beach County deputies. The inaugural recipients were Deputy Ralph "Butch" Waller, Deputy Ignacio "Dan" Diaz, and Corporal Luis Paez. On Feb. 2, 2026, H.R. 3497 passed in the House, and on May 11, 2026, it passed in the Senate. President Donald Trump signed the bill into law on May 28, 2026, and it was assigned as Public Law 119-94.

== Appearance ==
The medal is made of gold vermeil and was designed by Tiffany & Co. It features the coat of arms of the United States as well as three oak leaves, which, according to a statement from Representative Mast, represent "strength, resilience, and honoring the families of the fallen." The medal is also inscribed with the word "sacrifice."

The medal is issued with a blue ribbon for law enforcement officers and a red ribbon for first responders.
