= Specie Payment Resumption Act =

1875 law in the US

- Other short titles: Resumption Act of 1875 · Act of January 14, 1875
- Long title: An Act to provide for the resumption of specie payments.
- Enacted by: the 43rd United States Congress
- Effective: January 14, 1875

Citations
- Public law: Chapter 15
- Statutes at Large: 18 Stat. 296

Codification
- Acts amended: National Bank Act · Funding Act of 1870

Legislative history
- Introduced in the Senate as S. 1044 by R‑OH John Shermanth on December 21, 1874; Committee consideration by Senate Committee on Finance; Passed the Senate on December 22, 1874 (39–18); Passed the House on January 7, 1875 (136–98); Signed into law by President Ulysses S. Grant on January 14, 1875

Major amendments
- Bland–Allison Act (1878)

The Specie Payment Resumption Act of January 14, 1875 was a law in the United States that restored the nation to the gold standard through the redemption of previously unbacked United States Notes and reversed inflationary government policies promoted directly after the American Civil War. The decision further contracted the nation's money supply and was seen by critics as an exacerbating factor of the so-called Long Depression, which struck in 1873.

== History ==
Late in 1861, seeking to raise revenue for the American Civil War effort without exhausting its reserves of gold and silver, the United States federal government suspended specie payments, or the payments made in gold and silver in redemption of currency notes. Early in 1862, the United States issued legal-tender notes, called greenbacks. By war's end, a total of $431 million in greenbacks had been issued, and authorization had been given for another $50 million in small denominations, known as fractional currency or "shin plasters." The issuance of greenbacks caused inflation during the period.

Immediately after the Civil War during Reconstruction, there were large capital inflows into the United States and a general improvement in the export-to-import ratio since the export-dominant South was reintegrated with the North. The United States Treasury, however, had increased its cash balance through the summer of 1873 by selling gold for $14 million. National banks also increased issuance of national bank notes by $44 million. The failure of several railroad companies including Jay Cooke & Company on their bond obligations encouraged capital outflows from the United States to Europe and weakened demand for dollars leading to the Panic of 1873. Increased Treasury cash balances, continued issuance of national bank notes, and capital outflows together depreciated the currency. These factors further caused a reduction in reserves held by monetary institutions because higher prices increased domestic demand for currency. Reserves held by banks were insufficient to be able to meet seasonal demands in autumn of 1873 as greenback reserves declined from $34 million in September 1873 to $5 million in October 1873. Tensions surrounding the Panic of 1873 between creditors and debtors revived the specie payment resumption debate.

Two views dominated this debate. Conservatives and the creditor class favored "hard money"; they favored resumption as a method for making up losses incurred due to dollar depreciation during the past decade. The resumption of specie payments was perceived as a method to curb the rise in the price level and eventually equate currency with gold. For creditors, that had issued debts in inflated greenbacks, resumption would increase the real interest rate that they received. Supporters of the Resumption Act argued that the Panic of 1873 might not have occurred had there been sufficient reserves of gold in the United States Treasury as would have been the case if specie payments were resumed.

Opposed to resumption, a new coalition of agrarian and labor interests found common cause during Reconstruction in advocating for "soft money" or the promotion of inflationary monetary policies. These groups viewed the Panic of 1873 as the result of insufficient currency that should have been used to fuel the growth in production that occurred in the South and the West. These regions relied on cheap money – that is low interest rates – to be able to continue to grow. Other soft money advocates included gold speculators and the railroad industry. Collis P. Huntington and other railroad leaders called for further greenback issuance in light of harsh business conditions that made honoring debt obligations difficult. Opponents of the Resumption Act also argued that many debt obligations were made in an environment in which there existed a premium on gold, that is that inflation in the currency in the previous decade made gold relatively more valuable than currency. Resumption therefore entailed up to a 50% increase in debt obligation if gold and currency equalized. For manufacturers, the rising price of gold made domestic prices cheaper relative to import prices since many European currencies including sterling were fixed to the price of gold. Hence continued inflationary measures such as further issuance of greenbacks artificially supported domestic industries. Hard and soft money interests often did cross party lines, although a larger portion of Democrats were hard money advocates.

Following the Democratic victory in the congressional elections of 1874, the lame-duck Republican Congress passed the Resumption Act on January 14, 1875. It required the Secretary of the Treasury to redeem greenbacks in specie on demand on or after 1 January 1879. The Act, however, did not provide for a specific mechanism for redemption. The Act, though, did allow the Secretary of Treasury to acquire gold reserves either via any federal surpluses or the issuance of government bonds. An established gold reserve allowed for daily variations in specie flows and facilitated resumption. The act abolished the seigniorage fee on coining gold and substituted silver for any still existing fractional currency. The Resumption Act set no limit on the quantity of national bank notes that could be issued; this idea became known as "free banking." This provision led many conservatives to believe that the Act was inflationary in nature. However, the Resumption Act also required that greenbacks be retired in a proportion of 80% of new national bank note issue, which in theory aimed to contract the money supply and hence encourage dollar appreciation such that gold and currency might equate. However, in practice the effect was mild: the total quantity of greenbacks in circulation fell from $382 million at the end of 1874 to $300 million following the passage of the Resumption Act.

The Resumption Act was hotly debated during the 1880 presidential election, with most western politicians opposed to it. Specie payments had finally resumed during the presidency of Rutherford B. Hayes. Aided by the return of prosperity in 1877, Secretary of the Treasury John Sherman accumulated a gold reserve to be redeemed for existing greenbacks mostly from transactions with Europe. Sherman earmarked a redemption fund by January 1, 1879, that amounted to $133 million acquired from the sale of bonds to Europe and Treasury surplus. However, when people found greenbacks to be on par with gold, they lost their desire for redemption.

== Reaction and evaluation ==
Reactions as to the effects of the Resumption Act are mixed. Contemporaries did not consider it an outright victory for hard money. The legislation stood as a compromise engineered by Senators John Sherman and George Edmunds between hard and soft money advocates. Milton Friedman and Anna J. Schwartz argue that the Resumption Act had mixed effects on actual resumption of specie payments, saying that primary economic product of the Act was that it instilled confidence in the business community on the maintenance of specie payments. According to Jennifer 8 Lee, backing American currency with gold helped curb inflation and stabilize the dollar. The Act served as a signal to businesses of an approaching exchange rate between gold and currency. Preparations among businesses for this exchange rate actually encourage parity between gold and currency.

The Act did not directly address the price level although successful resumption at par value required that the premium on gold to fall to zero, which in turn required a fall in the price level as the world price of gold was exogenous. In fact, the final date for Resumption was decided only after the premium on gold had fallen to a tenth of its peak level. The decline in the premium cannot entirely be attributed to the Resumption Act, as downward pressure on the overall price level also resulted from increased production in the South especially during 1877. The first four months of that year sold as much beef to England as had been sold all of the preceding year. The act has also been criticized for both failing to remove all greenbacks from circulation and failing to dictate what might be done with the greenbacks remaining in circulation.
