= Funding Act of 1870 =

Act of US Congress to re-fund the national debt

- Other short titles: Act of July 14, 1870
- Long title: An Act to authorize the refunding of the national debt.
- Enacted by: the 41st United States Congress
- Effective: July 14, 1870

Citations
- Public law: Chapter 256
- Statutes at Large: 16 Stat. 272

Legislative history
- Introduced in the Senate as S. 380 by R‑OH John Shermanth on January 1870; Committee consideration by Senate Committee on Finance · House Committee on Ways and Means; Passed the Senate on March 11, 1870 (Voice vote); Passed the House on July 1, 1870 (129–42); Reported by the joint conference committee on July 1870; agreed to by the House on July 12, 1870 (139–54 (agreed to conference report)) and by the Senate on July 13, 1870 (Voice vote (agreed to conference report)); Signed into law by President Ulysses S. Grant on July 14, 1870

Major amendments
- Act of January 20, 1871 (16 Stat. 399)

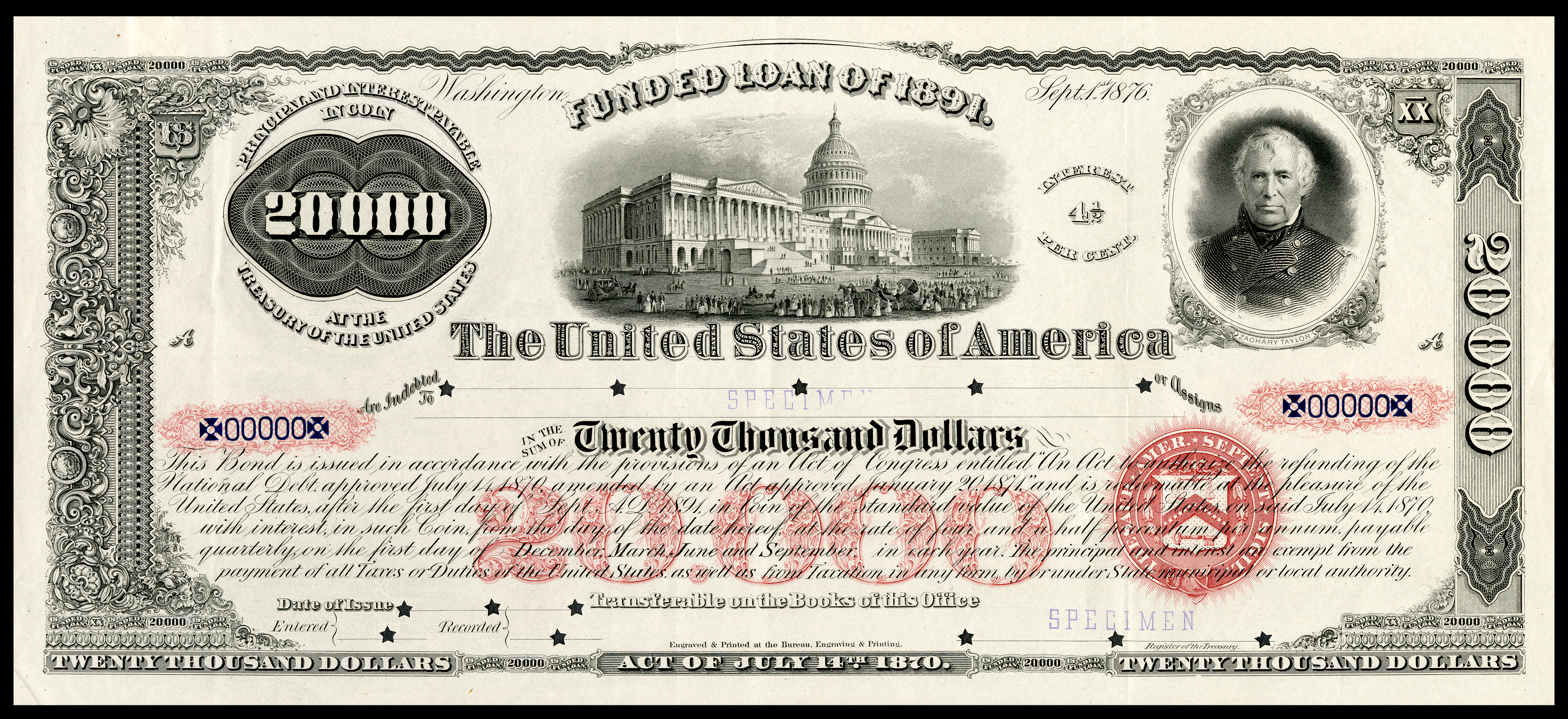
$20,000 bond issued in 1891 and authorized by the Funding Act of 1870

The Funding Act of 1870 (41st Congress, Sess. 2, ch. 256, 16 Stat. 272, enacted July 14, 1870) was an Act of Congress to re-fund the national debt. It allowed the exchange of high interest, short-term floating bonds bearing lower interest and terms of up to 30 years. Principal and interest of the new issues would be paid in "coin of the present standard value."

== Legislative history ==
The bill was sponsored by Senator John Sherman (R) of Ohio. The debate over the funding bill was long and intense. The discussion focused very heavily on public virtue, national honesty, and avoiding "repudiation" on the one hand and unearned reward to speculators on the other. Members generally agreed that an investor should finally receive no more and no less than he lent on a contract at the beginning.
