= Currency Act of 1870 =

- Other short titles: National Gold Bank Act · Act of July 12, 1870
- Long title: An Act To provide a national currency of coin notes, and to equalize the distribution of circulating notes.
- Enacted by: the 41st United States Congress
- Effective: July 12, 1870

Citations
- Public law: Chapter 252
- Statutes at Large: 16 Stat. 251

Codification
- Acts amended: National Bank Act (1864)

Legislative history
- Introduced in the Senate as S. 378 by R‑OH John Shermanth on January 1870; Committee consideration by Senate Committee on Finance; Passed the Senate on February 2, 1870 (39–23); Passed the House on June 15, 1870 (112–53); Reported by the joint conference committee on June–July 1870; agreed to by the House on July 7, 1870 (Voice vote (agreed to conference report)) and by the Senate on July 9, 1870 (Voice vote (agreed to conference report)); Signed into law by President Ulysses S. Grant on July 12, 1870

Major amendments
- Specie Payment Resumption Act (1875)

The Currency Act of 1870 (41st Congress, Sess. 2, ch. 252, 16 Stat. 251, enacted July 12, 1870) maintained greenbacks issued during the American Civil War at their existing level, about $356 million, neither contracting them nor issuing more. It replaced $45 million in "temporary loan certificates," paper bearing 3% interest but which circulated as currency, with the same amount of national bank notes issued by newly chartered banks. While achieving currency stabilization, the act answered midwestern pressure for more currency, and midwestern dissatisfaction with the concentration of national bank charters in the Northeast. The limit of the new bank note issue was small enough for northeastern Republicans to accept. Greenback Republicans could console themselves that the bill did not contemplate replacing greenbacks with national bank notes.

== Legislative history ==
The bill was sponsored by Senator John Sherman of Ohio. The act maintained greenbacks issued during the Civil War at their existing level, about $356 million, neither contracting them nor issuing more. It replaced $45 million in "temporary loan certificates," paper bearing 3% interest but which circulated as currency, with the same amount of national bank notes issued by newly chartered banks. While achieving currency stabilization, the act answered midwestern pressure for more currency, and midwestern dissatisfaction with the concentration of national bank charters in the Northeast. The limit of the new bank note issue was small enough for northeastern Republicans to accept. Greenback Republicans could console themselves that the bill did not contemplate replacing greenbacks with national bank notes.
