= List of historical longest-serving members of the United States Congress =

This is a list of United States congresspeople who have set records for longevity of service since the United States 1st Congress in 1789. It is divided up into several categories.

== Uninterrupted time ==
=== Senate and House ===
Begin date	End date	Name	Party	State	Service	Length of service
March 4, 1789	March 3, 1807	John Brown	Anti-Administration/ Democratic-Republican	Virginia/Kentucky	March 4, 1789 – March 3, 1805 (S, H)	5,842 dd
March 3, 1807	November 13, 1892	Nathaniel Macon	Anti-Administration/ Democratic-Republican	North Carolina	March 4, 1791 – November 14, 1828 (S, H)	13,769 dd
November 13, 1892	December 28, 1950	Justin Smith Morrill	Whig/Republican	Vermont	March 4, 1855 – December 28, 1898 (S, H)	16,005 dd
December 28, 1950	October 24, 1957	Adolph J. Sabath	Democratic	Illinois	March 4, 1907 – November 6, 1952 (H)	16,684 dd
October 24, 1957	November 18, 2009	Carl Hayden	Democratic	Arizona	February 19, 1912 – January 3, 1969 (S, H)	20,773 dd
November 18, 2009	June 6, 2013	Robert Byrd	Democratic	West Virginia	January 3, 1953 – June 28, 2010 (S, H)	20,995 dd
June 6, 2013		John Dingell	Democratic	Michigan	December 13, 1955 – January 3, 2015 (H)	21,571 dd

=== Senate ===
Begin date	End date	Name	Party	State	Service	Length of service
March 4, 1789	June 6, 1802	James Gunn	Anti-Administration/ Federalist	Georgia	March 4, 1789 – March 3, 1801	4,381 dd
March 4, 1789	June 6, 1802	John Langdon	Pro-Administration/ Anti-Administration/ Democratic-Republican	New Hampshire	March 4, 1789 – March 3, 1801	4,381 dd
June 6, 1802	December 6, 1808	Theodore Foster	Pro-Administration/ Federalist/ Democratic-Republican	Rhode Island	June 7, 1790 – March 3, 1803	4,651 dd
December 6, 1808	December 25, 1811	James Hillhouse	Federalist	Connecticut	March 12, 1796 – June 10, 1810	5,202 dd
December 25, 1811	May 12, 1822	Joseph Anderson	Democratic-Republican	Tennessee	September 26, 1797 – March 3, 1815	6,366 dd
May 12, 1822	March 5, 1841	John Gaillard	Democratic-Republican	South Carolina	December 6, 1804 – February 26, 1826	7,752 dd
March 5, 1841	December 11, 1845	William R. King	Democratic-Republican/ Democratic	Alabama	December 14, 1819 – April 15, 1844	8,889 dd
December 11, 1845	September 24, 1896	Thomas Hart Benton	Democratic-Republican/ Democratic	Missouri	August 10, 1821 – March 3, 1851	10,797 dd
September 24, 1896	December 29, 1904	Justin Smith Morrill	Whig/ Republican	Vermont	March 4, 1867 – December 28, 1898	11,622 dd
December 29, 1904	August 3, 1944	William B. Allison	Republican	Iowa	March 4, 1873 – August 4, 1908	12,936 dd
August 3, 1944	November 17, 1952	Ellison D. Smith	Democratic	South Carolina	March 4, 1909 – November 17, 1944	13,042 dd
November 17, 1952	January 3, 1963	Kenneth McKellar	Democratic	Tennessee	March 4, 1917 – January 3, 1953	13,089 dd
January 3, 1963	September 9, 1998	Carl Hayden	Democratic	Arizona	March 4, 1927 – January 3, 1969	15,281 dd
September 9, 1998	February 28, 2005	Strom Thurmond	Democratic/ Republican	South Carolina	November 7, 1956 – January 3, 2003	16,858 dd
February 28, 2005		Robert Byrd	Democratic	West Virginia	January 3, 1959 – June 28, 2010	18,804 dd

=== House ===
Begin date	End date	Name	Party	State	Service	Length of service
March 4, 1789	March 3, 1803	George Thatcher	Pro-Administration/ Federalist	Massachusetts	March 4, 1789 – March 3, 1801	4,381 dd
March 3, 1803	December 12, 1825	Nathaniel Macon	Anti-Administration/ Democratic-Republican	North Carolina	March 4, 1791 – December 13, 1815	9,049 dd
December 12, 1825	March 9, 1908	Thomas Newton, Jr.	Democratic-Republican	Virginia	March 4, 1801 – March 9, 1830	10,597 dd
March 9, 1908	March 21, 1940	Henry H. Bingham	Republican	Pennsylvania	March 4, 1879 – March 22, 1912	12,071 dd
March 21, 1940	October 24, 1957	Adolph J. Sabath	Democratic	Illinois	March 4, 1907 – November 6, 1952	16,684 dd
October 24, 1957	July 18, 1963	Sam Rayburn	Democratic	Texas	March 4, 1913 – November 16, 1961	17,789 dd
July 18, 1963	January 5, 1992	Carl Vinson	Democratic	Georgia	November 3, 1914 – January 3, 1965	18,324 dd
January 5, 1992	February 10, 2009	Jamie L. Whitten	Democratic	Mississippi	November 4, 1941 – January 3, 1995	19,418 dd
February 10, 2009		John Dingell	Democratic	Michigan	December 13, 1955 – January 3, 2015	21,571 dd

== Interrupted time ==
=== Senate and House ===
Begin date	End date	Name	Party	State	Service	Length of service
March 4, 1789	March 3, 1807	John Brown	Anti-Administration/ Democratic-Republican	Virginia/Kentucky	March 4, 1789 – March 3, 1805 (S, H)	5,842 dd
March 3, 1807	October 15, 1831	Nathaniel Macon	Anti-Administration/ Democratic-Republican	North Carolina	March 4, 1791 – November 14, 1828 (S, H)	13,769 dd
October 15, 1831	April 2, 1894	Samuel Smith	Anti-Administration/ Democratic-Republican	Maryland	March 4, 1793 – March 3, 1815; January 31, 1816 – March 3, 1833 (S, H)	14,274 dd
April 2, 1894	December 31, 1920	Justin Smith Morrill	Whig/Republican	Vermont	March 4, 1855 – December 28, 1898 (S, H)	16,005 dd
December 31, 1920	February 14, 1958	Joseph G. Cannon	Republican	Illinois	March 4, 1873 – March 3, 1891; March 4, 1893 – March 3, 1913; March 4, 1915 – March 3, 1923 (H)	16,797 dd
February 14, 1958	November 18, 2009	Carl Hayden	Democratic	Arizona	February 19, 1912 – January 3, 1969 (S, H)	20,773 dd
November 18, 2009	June 6, 2013	Robert Byrd	Democratic	West Virginia	January 3, 1953 – June 28, 2010 (S, H)	20,995 dd
June 6, 2013		John Dingell	Democratic	Michigan	December 13, 1955 – January 3, 2015 (H)	21,571 dd

=== Senate ===
Begin date	End date	Name	Party	State	Service	Length of service
March 4, 1789	June 6, 1802	James Gunn	Anti-Administration/ Federalist	Georgia	March 4, 1789 – March 3, 1801	4,381 dd
March 4, 1789	June 6, 1802	John Langdon	Pro-Administration/ Anti-Administration/ Democratic-Republican	New Hampshire	March 4, 1789 – March 3, 1801	4,381 dd
June 6, 1802	December 6, 1808	Theodore Foster	Pro-Administration/ Federalist/ Democratic-Republican	Rhode Island	June 7, 1790 – March 3, 1803	4,651 dd
December 6, 1808	December 25, 1811	James Hillhouse	Federalist	Connecticut	March 12, 1796 – June 10, 1810	5,202 dd
December 25, 1811	May 12, 1822	Joseph Anderson	Democratic-Republican	Tennessee	September 26, 1797 – March 3, 1815	6,366 dd
May 12, 1822	March 8, 1832	John Gaillard	Democratic-Republican	South Carolina	December 6, 1804 – February 26, 1826	7,752 dd
March 8, 1832	February 28, 1842	Samuel Smith	Democratic-Republican	Maryland	March 4, 1803 – March 3, 1815; December 16, 1822 – March 3, 1833	8,112 dd
February 28, 1842	December 11, 1845	William R. King	Democratic-Republican/ Democratic	Alabama	December 14, 1819 – April 15, 1844	8,889 dd
December 11, 1845	October 8, 1894	Thomas Hart Benton	Democratic-Republican/ Democratic	Missouri	August 10, 1821 – March 3, 1851	10,797 dd
October 8, 1894	February 20, 1905	John Sherman	Republican	Ohio	March 21, 1861 – March 8, 1877; March 4, 1881 – March 4, 1897	11,675 dd
February 20, 1905	April 20, 1928	William B. Allison	Republican	Iowa	March 4, 1873 – August 4, 1908	12,936 dd
April 20, 1928	March 8, 1964	Francis E. Warren	Republican	Wyoming	November 18, 1890 – March 3, 1893; March 4, 1895 – November 24, 1929	13,519 dd
March 8, 1964	May 30, 1997	Carl Hayden	Democratic	Arizona	March 4, 1927 – January 3, 1969	15,281 dd
May 30, 1997	June 10, 2006	Strom Thurmond	Democratic/ Republican	South Carolina	December 24, 1954 – April 4, 1956; November 7, 1956 – January 3, 2003	17,325 dd
June 10, 2006		Robert Byrd	Democratic	West Virginia	January 3, 1959 – June 28, 2010	18,804 dd

=== House ===
Begin date	End date	Name	Party	State	Service	Length of service
March 4, 1789	March 3, 1803	George Thatcher	Pro-Administration/ Federalist	Massachusetts	March 4, 1789 – March 3, 1801	4,381 dd
March 3, 1803	December 12, 1825	Nathaniel Macon	Anti-Administration/ Democratic-Republican	North Carolina	March 4, 1791 – December 13, 1815	9,049 dd
December 12, 1825	March 11, 1904	Thomas Newton, Jr.	Democratic-Republican	Virginia	March 4, 1801 – March 9, 1830; March 4, 1831 – March 3, 1833	11,327 dd
March 11, 1904	November 3, 1908	John H. Ketcham	Republican	New York	March 4, 1865 – March 3, 1873; March 4, 1877 – March 3, 1893; March 4, 1897 – November 4, 1906	12,295 dd
November 3, 1908	February 28, 1959	Joseph G. Cannon	Republican	Illinois	March 4, 1873 – March 3, 1891; March 4, 1893 – March 3, 1913; March 4, 1915 – March 3, 1923	16,797 dd
February 28, 1959	July 18, 1963	Sam Rayburn	Democratic	Texas	March 4, 1913 – November 16, 1961	17,789 dd
July 18, 1963	January 5, 1992	Carl Vinson	Democratic	Georgia	November 3, 1914 – January 3, 1965	18,324 dd
January 5, 1992	February 10, 2009	Jamie L. Whitten	Democratic	Mississippi	November 4, 1941 – January 3, 1995	19,418 dd
February 10, 2009		John Dingell	Democratic	Michigan	December 13, 1955 – January 3, 2015	21,571 dd
