= John Sherman =

American politician (1823–1900)

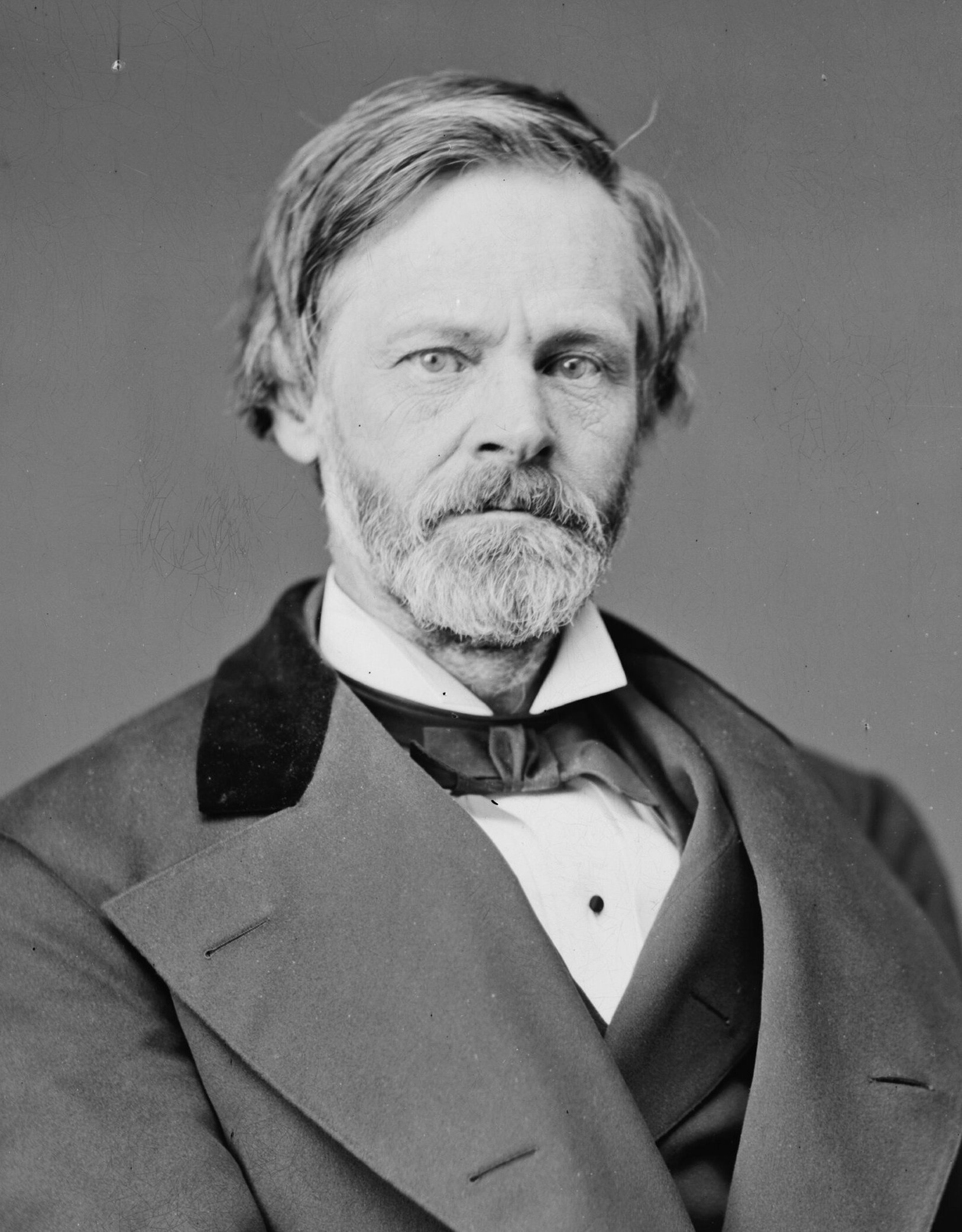
- Sherman c. 1865–1880

35th United States Secretary of State
- In office March 6, 1897 – April 27, 1898
- President: William McKinley
- Preceded by: Richard Olney
- Succeeded by: William R. Day

President pro tempore of the United States Senate
- In office December 7, 1885 – February 26, 1887
- Preceded by: George F. Edmunds
- Succeeded by: John James Ingalls

United States Senator from Ohio
- In office March 4, 1881 – March 4, 1897
- Preceded by: Allen G. Thurman
- Succeeded by: Mark Hanna
- In office March 21, 1861 – March 8, 1877
- Preceded by: Salmon P. Chase
- Succeeded by: Stanley Matthews
Senate positions
Chairman of the Senate Republican Conference
In office December 1891 – March 4, 1897
| Preceded by | George F. Edmunds |
| Succeeded by | William B. Allison |
In office September 2, 1884 – December 1885
| Preceded by | Henry B. Anthony |
| Succeeded by | George F. Edmunds |
Chair of the Senate Foreign Relations Committee
In office March 4, 1895 – March 4, 1897
| Preceded by | John T. Morgan |
| Succeeded by | William P. Frye |
In office March 8, 1886 – March 4, 1893
| Preceded by | John Miller |
| Succeeded by | John T. Morgan |
Chair of the Senate Finance Committee
In office March 4, 1867 – March 4, 1877
| Preceded by | William P. Fessenden |
| Succeeded by | Justin S. Morrill |
In office July 2, 1864 – March 4, 1865
| Preceded by | William P. Fessenden |
| Succeeded by | William P. Fessenden |
Chair of the Senate Agriculture Committee
In office March 4, 1865 – March 4, 1867
| Preceded by | Jim Lane |
| Succeeded by | Simon Cameron |
In office March 4, 1863 – July 2, 1864
| Preceded by | Philip Allen (1857) |
| Succeeded by | Jim Lane |

32nd United States Secretary of the Treasury
- In office March 10, 1877 – March 3, 1881
- President: Rutherford B. Hayes
- Preceded by: Lot M. Morrill
- Succeeded by: William Windom

Member of the U.S. House of Representatives from Ohio's 13th district
- In office March 4, 1855 – March 21, 1861
- Preceded by: William D. Lindsley
- Succeeded by: Samuel T. Worcester
House positions
Chair of the House Ways and Means Committee
In office February 1, 1860 – March 4, 1861
| Preceded by | John S. Phelps |
| Succeeded by | Thaddeus Stevens |

Personal details
- Born: May 10, 1823 Lancaster, Ohio, U.S.
- Died: October 22, 1900 (aged 77) Washington, D.C., U.S.
- Resting place: Mansfield City Cemetery
- Party: Whig (before 1854); Anti-Nebraska (1854–1858); Republican (1858–1900)
- Spouse: Margaret Stewart (m. 1848)
- Children: Mary Sherman (adopted)
- Relatives: Charles Taylor Sherman (brother); William Tecumseh Sherman (brother); Hoyt Sherman (brother)
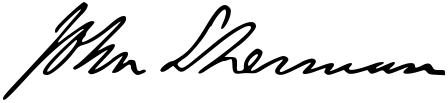
- Signature

John Sherman (May 10, 1823 – October 22, 1900) was an American politician from Ohio who served in federal office throughout the Civil War and into the late nineteenth century. A member of the Republican Party, he served in both houses of the U.S. Congress. He also served as Secretary of the Treasury and Secretary of State. Sherman sought the Republican presidential nomination three times, coming closest in 1888, but was never chosen by the party. Between 1861 and 1897, John Sherman served in the U.S. Senate for nearly 32 years and holds the record for longest serving senator from the state of Ohio (1861–1877; 1881–1897).

Born in Lancaster, Ohio, Sherman later moved to Mansfield, Ohio, where he began a law career before entering politics. He was the younger brother of Union general William Tecumseh Sherman, with whom he had a close relationship. Initially a Whig, Sherman was among those anti-slavery activists who formed what became the Republican Party. He served three terms in the House of Representatives. As a member of the House, Sherman traveled to Kansas to investigate the unrest between pro- and anti-slavery partisans there. He rose in party leadership and was nearly elected Speaker in 1859. Sherman was elected to the Senate in 1861. As a senator, he was a leader in financial matters, helping to redesign the United States' monetary system to meet the needs of a nation torn apart by civil war. He also served as the chair of the Senate Agriculture Committee during his 32 years in the Senate. After the war, he worked to produce legislation that would restore the nation's credit abroad and produce a stable, gold-backed currency at home.

Serving as Secretary of the Treasury in the administration of Rutherford B. Hayes, Sherman continued his efforts for financial stability and solvency, overseeing an end to wartime inflationary measures and a return to gold-backed money. He returned to the Senate after his term expired, serving there for a further sixteen years. During that time he continued his work on financial legislation, as well as writing and debating laws on immigration, business competition law, and the regulation of interstate commerce. Sherman was the principal author of the Sherman Antitrust Act, which was signed into law by President Benjamin Harrison in 1890. In 1897, President William McKinley appointed him Secretary of State. Failing health and declining faculties made him unable to handle the burdens of the job, and he retired in 1898 at the start of the Spanish–American War. Sherman died at his home in Washington, D.C., in 1900 at age 77.

== Early life and education ==
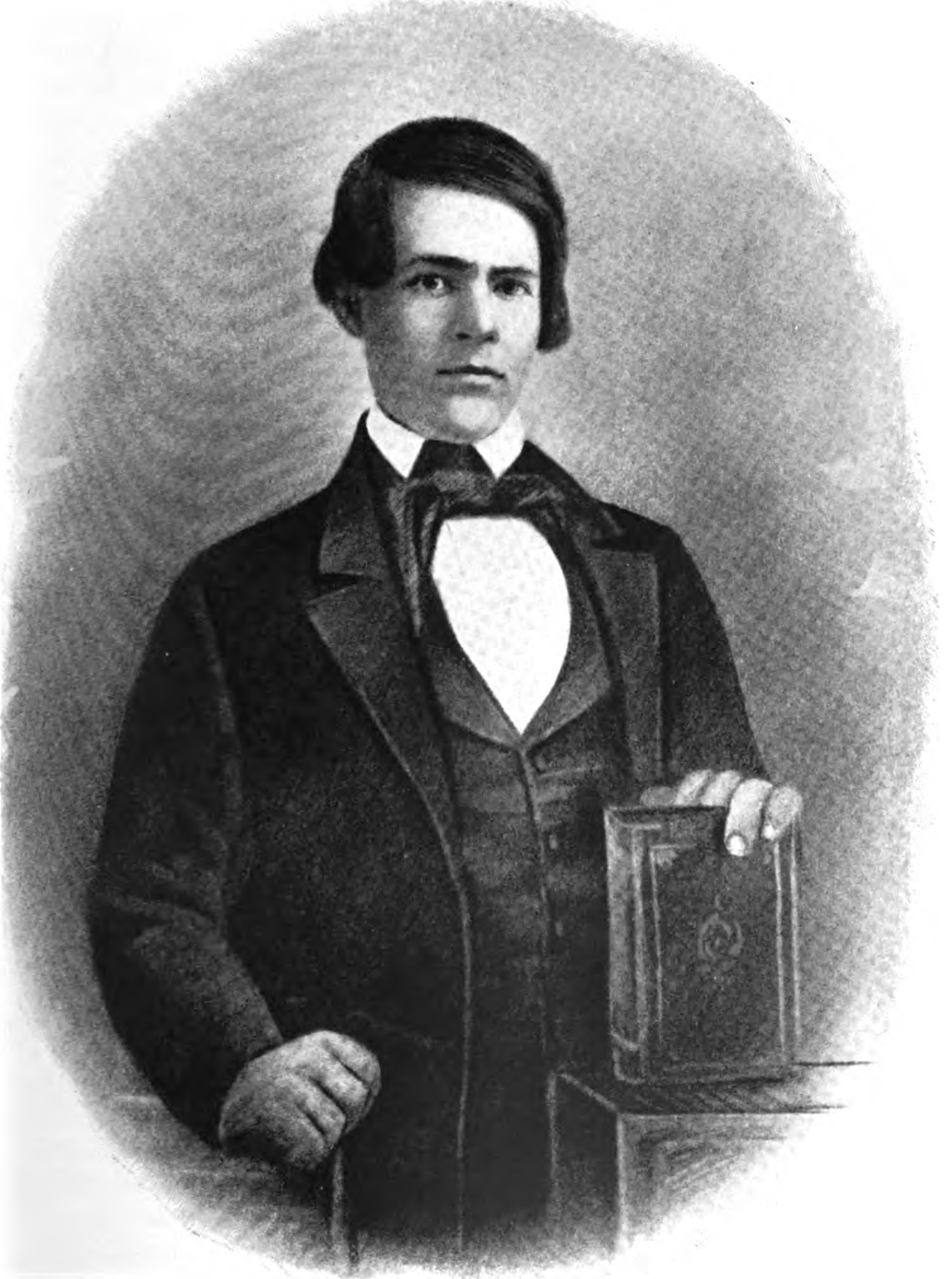
Sherman at age 19

Sherman was born in Lancaster, Ohio, on May 10, 1823, to Charles Robert Sherman and his wife, Mary Hoyt Sherman, the eighth of their 11 children. John Sherman's grandfather, Taylor Sherman, a Connecticut lawyer and judge, first visited Ohio in the early nineteenth century, gaining title to several parcels of land before returning to Connecticut. After Taylor's death in 1815, his son Charles, newly married to Mary Hoyt, moved the family west to Ohio. Several other Sherman relatives soon followed, and Charles became established as a lawyer in Lancaster. By the time of John Sherman's birth, Charles had just been appointed a justice of the Supreme Court of Ohio.

Sherman's father died suddenly in 1829, leaving his mother to care for 11 children. Several of the oldest children, including Sherman's older brother William Tecumseh Sherman, were fostered with nearby relatives, but John and his brother Hoyt stayed with their mother in Lancaster until 1831. In that year, Sherman's father's cousin (also named John Sherman) took Sherman into his home in Mount Vernon, Ohio, where he enrolled in school. The elder John Sherman intended for his namesake to study there until he was ready to enroll at nearby Kenyon College, but Sherman disliked school and was, in his own words, "a troublesome boy". In 1835, he returned to his mother's home in Lancaster. Sherman continued his education there at a local academy where, after being briefly expelled for punching a teacher, he studied for two years.

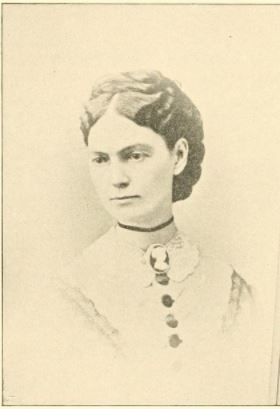
Margaret Cecilia Stewart

In 1837, Sherman left school and found a job as a junior surveyor on construction of improvements to the Muskingum River. Because he had obtained the job through Whig Party patronage, the election of a Democratic governor in 1838 meant that Sherman and the rest of his surveying crew were discharged from their jobs in June 1839. The following year, he moved to Mansfield to study law in the office of his older brother, Charles Taylor Sherman. He was admitted to the bar in 1844 and joined his brother's firm. Sherman quickly became successful at the practice of law, and by 1847 had accumulated property worth $10,000 (~$292,472 in 2025) and was a partner in several local businesses. By that time, Sherman and his brother Charles were able to support their mother and two unmarried sisters, who now moved to a house Sherman purchased in Mansfield. In 1848, Sherman married Margaret Cecilia Stewart, the daughter of a local judge. The couple never had any biological children, but adopted a daughter, Mary, in 1864.

Around the same time, Sherman began to take a larger role in politics. In 1844, he addressed a political rally on behalf of the Whig candidate for president that year, Henry Clay. Four years later, Sherman was a delegate to the Whig National Convention where the eventual winner Zachary Taylor was nominated. As with most conservative Whigs, Sherman supported the Compromise of 1850 as the best solution to the growing sectional divide. In 1852, Sherman was again a delegate to the Whig National Convention, where he supported the eventual nominee, Winfield Scott, against rivals Daniel Webster and incumbent Millard Fillmore, who had become president following Taylor's death.

== House of Representatives ==
Sherman moved north to Cleveland in 1853 and established a law office there with two partners. Events soon interrupted Sherman's plans for a new law firm, as the passage of the Kansas–Nebraska Act in 1854 inspired him (and many other anti-slavery Northerners) to take a more involved role in politics. That Act, the brainchild of Illinois Democrat Stephen A. Douglas, opened the two named territories to slavery, an implicit repeal of the Missouri Compromise of 1820. Intended to quiet national agitation over slavery by shifting the decision to local settlers, Douglas's Act instead inflamed anti-slavery sentiment in the North by allowing the possibility of slavery's expansion to territories held as free soil for three decades. Two months after the Act's passage, Sherman became a candidate for Ohio's 13th congressional district. A local convention nominated Sherman over two other candidates to represent what was then called the Anti-Nebraska Party (later to become the Republican Party). The new party, a fusion of Free Soilers, Whigs, and anti-slavery Democrats, had many discordant elements, and some among the former group thought Sherman too conservative on the slavery question. Nevertheless, they supported him against the incumbent Democrat, William D. Lindsley. Democrats were defeated across Ohio that year, and Sherman was elected by 2,823 votes.

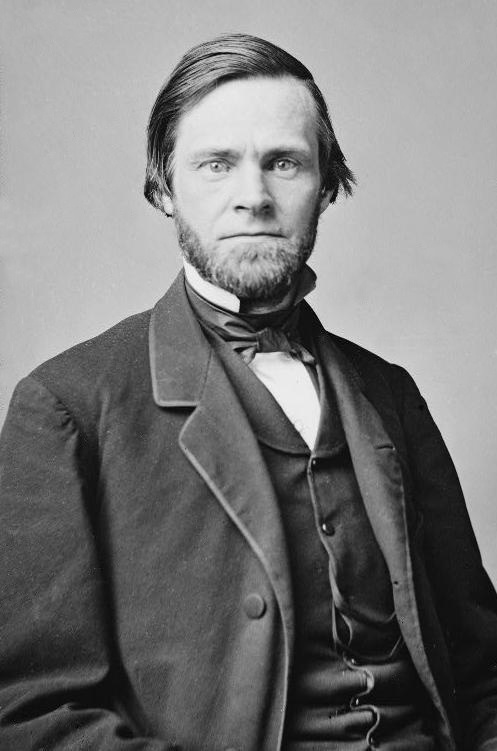
Congressman John Sherman

=== Kansas Territory ===
When the 34th United States Congress convened in December 1855, (Note: At that time, Congress did not convene as soon as they took office (March), but usually waited until the end of the year.) members opposed to Democratic president Franklin Pierce (most of them Northerners) held the majority in the House, while the Democrats retained their majority in the Senate. That House majority, however, was not fully unified, with some members adhering to the new anti-Nebraska party, and others loyal to the new nativist American (or "Know-Nothing") party. The Know Nothings were also fractious, with some former Whigs and some former Free Soilers in their ranks. The result was a House that was unable to elect a speaker for two months. When they finally agreed on the election of Nathaniel Banks of Massachusetts, the House quickly turned to the matter of Kansas. Preventing the expansion of slavery to Kansas was the one issue that united Banks's fragile majority, and the House resolved to send three members to investigate the situation in that territory; Sherman was one of the three selected.

Sherman spent two months in the territory and was the primary author of the 1,188-page report filed on conditions there when they returned in April 1856. The report explained what anti-administration members already feared: that the principle of local control was being seriously undermined by the invasion of Missourians who, while not intending to settle there, used violence to coerce the Kansans to elect pro-slavery members to the territorial legislature. The House took no action on the reports, but they were widely distributed as campaign documents. That July, Sherman proposed an amendment to an army appropriation act to bar use of federal troops to enforce the acts of the Kansas territorial legislature, which many now viewed as an illegitimate body. The amendment narrowly passed the House, but was removed by the Senate; the House ultimately agreed to the change. In spite of this defeat, however, Sherman had achieved considerable prominence for a freshman representative.

=== Lecompton and financial reform ===
Sherman was re-elected in 1856, defeating his Democratic opponent, Herman J. Brumback, by 2,861 votes. The Republican candidate for president, John C. Frémont, carried Ohio while losing the national vote to the Democrat, James Buchanan. When the 35th Congress assembled in December 1857, the anti-Nebraska coalition—now formally the Republicans—had lost control of the House, and Sherman found himself in the minority. The sectional crisis had also deepened in the past year. In March 1857, the Supreme Court issued its decision in Dred Scott v. Sandford, holding that Congress had no power to prevent slavery in the territories and that blacks—whether free or enslaved—could not be citizens of the United States. In December of that year, in an election boycotted by free-state partisans, Kansas adopted the pro-slavery Lecompton Constitution and petitioned Congress to be admitted as a slave state. Buchanan urged that Congress take up the matter, and the Senate approved a bill to admit Kansas. Sherman spoke against the Kansas bill in the House, pointing out the evidence of fraud in the elections there. Some of the Northern Democrats joined with a unanimous Republican caucus to defeat the measure. Congress agreed to a compromise measure, by which Kansas would be admitted after another referendum on the Lecompton Constitution. The electorate rejected slavery and remained a territory, a decision Sherman would later call "the turning point of the slavery controversy".

Sherman's second term also saw his first speeches in Congress on the country's financial situation, which had been harmed by the Panic of 1857. Citing the need to pare unnecessary expenditures in light of diminished revenue, Sherman especially criticized Southern senators for adding appropriations to the House's bills. His speech attracted attention and was the start of Sherman's focus on financial matters, which would continue throughout his long political career.

=== House leadership ===
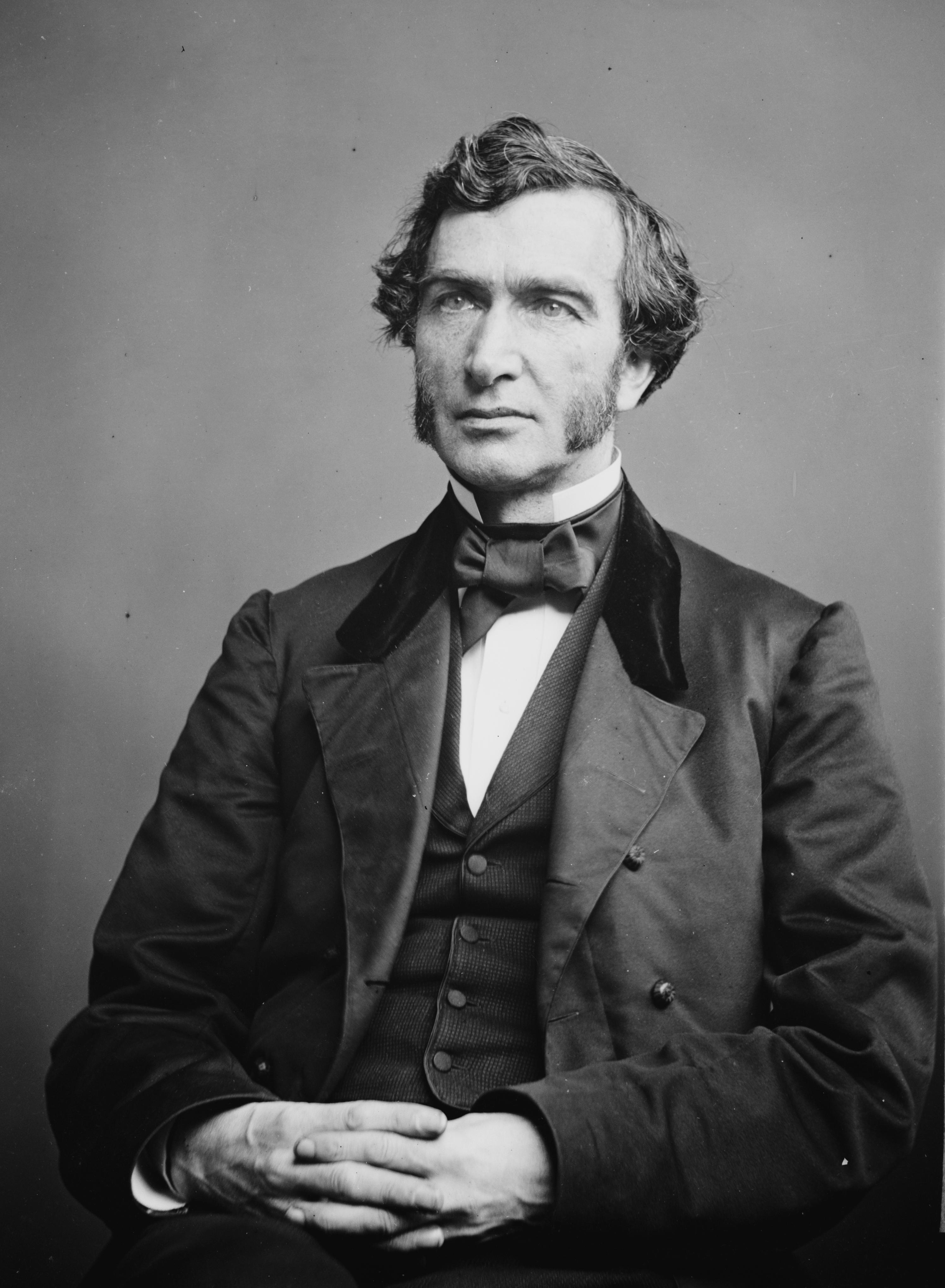
Sherman worked with Justin Smith Morrill to pass tariff legislation in 1860.

The voters returned Sherman to office for a third term during 1858. After a brief special session in March 1859, the 36th Congress adjourned, and Sherman and his wife went on vacation to Europe. When they returned that December, the situation was similar to that of four years earlier: no party had an absolute majority. Republicans held 109 seats, Democrats 101, and the combination of Oppositionists and Know Nothings 27. (Note: Sherman and his biographer, Burton, give these figures, but other references give different breakdowns of party membership. See, e.g., "Congress Profiles: 36th Congress (1859–1861)". History, Art & Archives. House of Representatives. This illustrates the difficulty in assigning party designations to a time of shifting loyalties and creation of a new party system.) Again, sectional tension had increased while Congress was in recess, this time due to John Brown's raid on Harpers Ferry, Virginia. The election for Speaker of the House promised to be contentious. This time, Sherman was among the leading candidates, receiving the second-largest number of votes on the first ballot, with no candidate receiving a majority. The election for Speaker was sidetracked immediately by a furor over an anti-slavery book, The Impending Crisis of the South, written by Hinton Rowan Helper and endorsed by many Republican members. Southerners accused Sherman of having endorsed the book, but he protested that he had only endorsed its use as a campaign tool and had never read it. After two months of balloting, no decision had been reached. After their attempts to adopt a plurality rule failed, Sherman accepted that he could not be elected, and withdrew. Republicans then shifted their support to William Pennington, who was elected on the forty-fourth ballot.

Pennington assigned Sherman to serve as chairman of the Committee on Ways and Means, where he spent much of his time on appropriations bills, while cooperating with his colleague Justin Smith Morrill on the passage of what became known as the Morrill Tariff. The Morrill Tariff raised duties on imports to close the deficit that had resulted from falling revenues. It also had the effect of encouraging domestic industries, which appealed to the former Whigs in the Republican party. Sherman spoke in favor of the bill, and it passed the House by a vote of 105 to 64. The tariff bill would likely have died in the Senate, but the withdrawal of Southern members at the start of the Civil War allowed the rump Senate to pass the bill in the 36th Congress final session, and President Buchanan signed it into law in February 1861. Likewise, Sherman supported a bill admitting Kansas as a free state that passed in 1861.

Sherman was renominated for Congress in 1860 and was active in Abraham Lincoln's campaign for president, giving speeches on his behalf in several states. Both were elected, with Sherman defeating his opponent, Barnabas Burns, by 2,864 votes. He returned to Washington for the lame duck session of the 36th Congress. By February 1861, seven states had reacted to Lincoln's election by seceding from the Union. In response, Congress passed a constitutional amendment proposed by Representative Thomas Corwin of Ohio. Known today as the Corwin Amendment, it was an attempt to forge a compromise to keep the remaining slave states in the Union and entice the seceded states to return. Corwin's legislation would have preserved the status quo on slavery and prohibited any future amendment granting Congress power to interfere with slavery in the states. Sherman voted for the amendment, which passed both houses of Congress and was sent to the states for ratification. Few states ratified it, and the passage of the Thirteenth Amendment in 1865, outlawing slavery, rendered the compromise measure moot.

== Senate ==
Lincoln took office on March 4, 1861. Among his first acts was to nominate Senator Salmon P. Chase of Ohio to be Secretary of the Treasury. Chase resigned his Senate seat on March 7, and after two weeks of indecisive balloting, the Ohio Legislature elected Sherman to the vacant seat. (Note: Before the passage of the Seventeenth Amendment to the United States Constitution in 1913, senators were chosen by their states' legislatures.) He took his seat on March 23, 1861, as the Senate had been called into special session to deal with the secession crisis. The Senate that convened at the start of the 37th Congress had a Republican majority for the first time, a majority that grew as more Southern members resigned or were expelled. In April, Sherman's brother William visited Washington to rejoin the army, and the brothers went together to the White House to meet Lincoln. Lincoln soon called for 75,000 men to enlist for three months to put down the rebellion, which William Sherman thought too few and too short a duration. William's thoughts on the war greatly influenced his brother, and John Sherman returned home to Ohio to encourage enlistment, briefly serving as an unpaid colonel of Ohio Volunteers.

=== Financing the Civil War ===
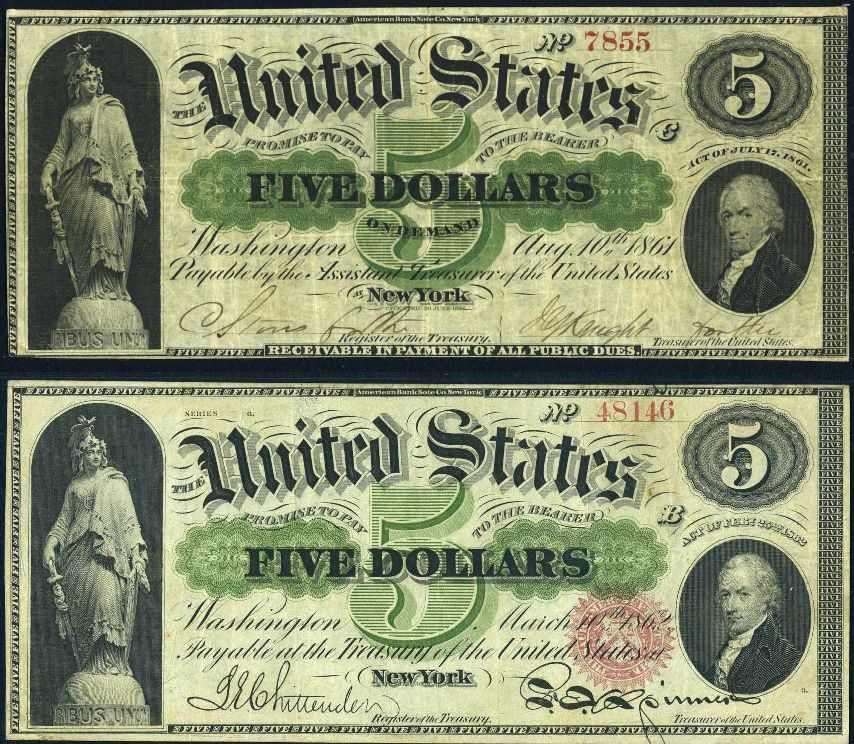
A Demand Note (top) and a United States Note (bottom)

The Civil War expenditures quickly strained the government's already fragile financial situation and Sherman, assigned to the Senate Finance Committee, was involved in the process of increasing the revenue. In July 1861, Congress authorized the government to issue Demand Notes, the first form of paper money issued directly by the United States government. The notes were redeemable in specie (i.e., gold or silver coin) but, as Sherman would note in his memoirs, they did not solve the revenue problem, as the government did not have the coin to redeem the notes should they all be presented for payment. To solve this problem, Chase asked for and Congress authorized the issuance of $150 million in bonds, which (as banks purchased them with gold) replenished the treasury. Congress also sought to increase revenue when they passed the Revenue Act of 1861, which imposed the first federal income tax in American history. Sherman endorsed the measure, and even spoke in favor of a steeper tax than the one imposed by the Act (3% on income above $800), preferring to raise revenue by taxation than by borrowing. (Note: The income tax was collected until 1870, when it was repealed.) In August, the special session closed and Sherman returned home to Mansfield to promote military recruitment again.

When Congress returned to Washington in December 1861, Sherman and the Finance Committee continued their attempts to fix the deepening financial crisis caused by the war. The financial situation had continued to worsen, resulting that month in banks suspending specie payments—that is, they refused to redeem their banknotes for gold. Gold began to disappear from circulation. With the 500,000 soldiers in the field, the government was spending the then-unheard-of sum of $2 million per day. Sherman understood that "a radical change in existing laws relating to our currency must be made, or ... the destruction of the Union would be unavoidable ..." Secretary Chase agreed and proposed that the Treasury Department issue United States Notes that were redeemable not in specie but in 6% government bonds. The bills would be "lawful money and a legal tender in the payment of all debts". Nothing but gold and silver coin had ever been legal tender in the United States, but Congress yielded to the wartime necessities, and the resulting First Legal Tender Act passed both the House and the Senate. (Note: The Senate did amend the bill to provide that interest on the national debt would continue to be paid in specie.) The Act limited the notes (later known as "greenbacks") to $150 million, but two subsequent Legal Tender Acts that year expanded the limit to $450 million. The idea of making paper money legal tender was controversial, and William Pitt Fessenden of Maine, chairman of the Senate Finance Committee, was among many who opposed the proposal. Sherman disagreed and spoke in favor of the idea. He defended his position as necessary in his memoirs, saying "from the passage of the legal tender act, by which means were provided for utilizing the wealth of the country in the suppression of the rebellion, the tide of war turned in our favor".

Reform of the nation's financial system continued in 1863 with the passage of the National Banking Act of 1863. This Act, first proposed by Chase in 1861 and introduced by Sherman two years later, established a series of nationally chartered private banks that would issue banknotes in coordination with the Treasury, replacing (though not completely) the system of state-chartered banks then in existence. Although the immediate purpose was to fund the war, the National Bank Act was intended to be permanent, and remained the law until 1913. A 10% tax on state banknotes passed in 1865 to encourage the shift to a national bank system. Sherman agreed with Chase wholeheartedly and hoped that state banking would be eliminated. Sherman believed the state-by-state system of regulation was disorderly and unable to facilitate the level of borrowing a modern nation might require. He also believed the state banks were unconstitutional. Not all Republicans shared Sherman's views, and when the Act eventually passed the Senate, it was by a narrow 23–21 vote. Lincoln signed the bill into law on February 25, 1863. (Note: The 1863 Act was followed a year later by the National Banking Act of 1864, which made various technical fixes and added a tax on state banks' deposits.)

=== Slavery and Reconstruction ===
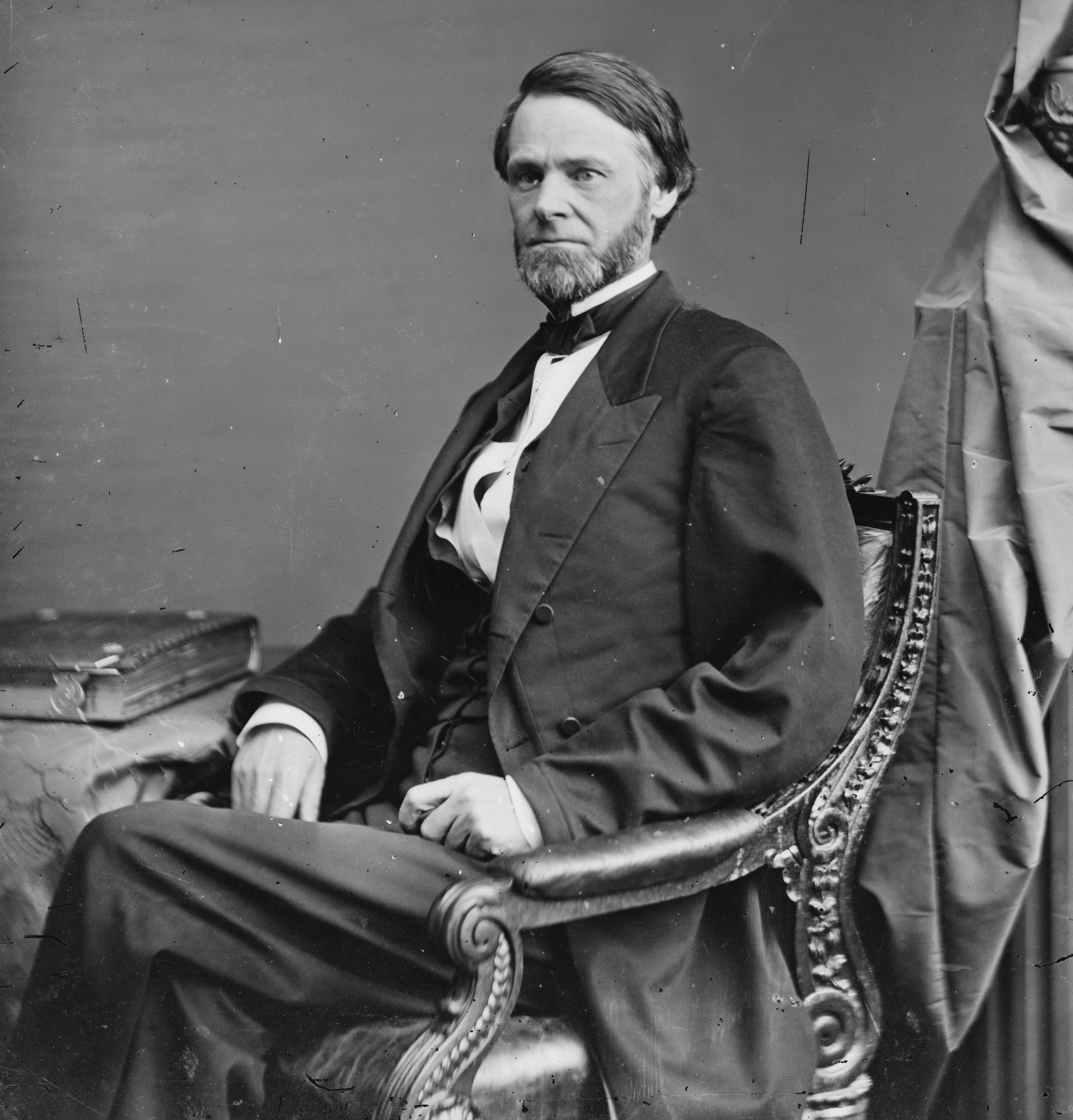
Senator John Sherman

Besides his role in financial matters, Sherman also participated in debate over the conduct of the war and goals for the post-war nation. Sherman voted for the Confiscation Act of 1861, which allowed the government to confiscate any property being used to support the Confederate war effort (including slaves) and for the act abolishing slavery in the District of Columbia. He also voted for the Confiscation Act of 1862, which clarified that slaves "confiscated" under the 1861 Act were freed. In 1864, Sherman voted for the Thirteenth Amendment to the United States Constitution, abolishing slavery. After some effort, it passed Congress and was ratified by the states the next year.

When the session ended, Sherman campaigned in Indiana and Ohio for Lincoln's reelection. In 1865, he attended Lincoln's second inauguration, then traveled to Savannah, Georgia to meet with his brother William, who had arrived there after his army's march to the sea. Sherman returned home to Mansfield in April, where he learned of Lincoln's assassination just days after the Confederate surrender. He was again in Washington for the Grand Review of the Armies and then returned home until December, when the 39th Congress assembled. There had been no special session that summer, and President Andrew Johnson, Lincoln's successor, had taken the lead on Reconstruction of the conquered South, to the consternation of many in Congress. Sherman and Johnson had been friendly, and some observers hoped that Sherman could serve as a liaison between Johnson and the party's "Radical" wing. By February 1866, however, Johnson was publicly attacking these Radical Republicans, who demanded harsh punishment of the rebels and federal action to assist the freedmen. The following month Johnson vetoed the proposed Civil Rights Act of 1866, which had passed Congress with overwhelming numbers. Sherman joined in overturning Johnson's veto. That same year, Sherman voted for the Fourteenth Amendment, which guaranteed equal protection of the laws to the freedmen. It became law in 1868.

By then, Johnson had made himself the enemy of most Republicans in Congress, including Sherman. Sherman, a moderate, took the side of the Radicals in voting for the Tenure of Office Act, which passed over Johnson's veto in 1867—but in debating the First Reconstruction Act, he argued against disenfranchising Southern men who had participated in the rebellion. The latter bill, amended to remove that provision, also passed over Johnson's veto. The continued conflict between Johnson and Congress culminated in Johnson's impeachment by the House in 1868. After a trial in the Senate, Sherman voted to convict, but the total vote was one short of the required two-thirds majority, and Johnson continued in office. Writing later, Sherman said that although he "liked the President personally and harbored against him none of the prejudice and animosity of some others," he believed Johnson had violated the Tenure of Office Act and accordingly voted to remove him from office.

With Ulysses S. Grant elected to the presidency in 1868, Congress had a more willing partner in Reconstruction. The 40th Congress's lame duck session passed the Fifteenth Amendment, which guaranteed that the right to vote could not be restricted because of race; Sherman joined the two-thirds majority that voted for its passage. The 41st Congress passed the Enforcement Act of 1870 to enforce its civil rights Amendments among a hostile Southern population. That Act, written by John Bingham of Ohio to mirror the Fourteenth Amendment, created penalties for violating another person's constitutional rights. The next year, Congress passed the Ku Klux Klan Act, which strengthened the Enforcement Act by allowing federal trials and federal troops to be used. Sherman voted in favor of both Acts, which had Grant's support.

=== Post-war finances ===
With the financial crisis abated, many in Congress wanted the greenbacks to be withdrawn from circulation. The public had never seen greenbacks as equivalent to specie, and by 1866 they circulated at a considerable discount, although their value had risen since the end of the war. (Note: During the war, it had taken up to $2.80 in greenbacks to buy one gold dollar. By 1866, the greenback had gained value, but it still took almost $1.50 in notes to equal the purchasing power of one dollar in gold.) Hugh McCulloch, the Treasury Secretary under Lincoln and Johnson, believed the notes were an emergency measure only and thought they should be gradually withdrawn. McCulloch proposed a bill, the Contraction Act, to convert some of the greenbacks from notes redeemable in bonds to interest-bearing notes redeemable in coin. Most Senate Finance Committee members had no objection, and Sherman found himself alone in opposition to it, believing that withdrawing greenbacks from circulation would contract the money supply and harm the economy. Sherman instead favored leaving the existing notes in circulation and letting the growth in population catch up to the growth in money supply. He suggested an amendment that would instead just allow the Treasury to redeem the notes for lower-interest bonds, now that the government's borrowing costs had decreased. Sherman's amendment was voted down, and the Contraction Act passed; greenbacks would be gradually withdrawn, but those still circulating would be redeemable for the high-interest bonds as before. In his memoirs, Sherman called this law "the most injurious and expensive financial measure ever enacted by Congress," as the continued high-interest payments it required "added fully $300,000,000 of interest" to the national debt.

The Ohio legislature reelected Sherman to another six-year term that year, and when (after a three-month vacation in Europe) he resumed his seat he again turned to the greenback question. Public support for greenbacks had grown, especially among businesspeople who thought withdrawal would lead to lower prices. When a bill passed the House suspending the authority to retire greenbacks under the Contraction Act, Sherman supported it in the Senate. It passed the Senate 33–4, and became law in 1868.

In the next Congress, among the first bills to pass the house was the Public Credit Act of 1869, which would require the government to pay bondholders in gold, not greenbacks. The 1868 election campaign had seen the Democrats proposing to repay the bondholders (mostly supporters of the Union war effort) in paper; Republicans favored gold, as the bonds had been purchased with gold. Sherman agreed with his fellow Republicans and voted with them to pass the bill 42–13. Sherman continued to favor wider circulation of the greenback when he voted for the Currency Act of 1870, which authorized an additional $54 million in United States Notes. Sherman was also involved in debate over the Funding Act of 1870. The Funding Act, which Sherman called "[t]he most important financial measure of that Congress," refunded the national debt. The bill as Sherman wrote it authorized $1.2 billion of low-interest rate bonds to be used to purchase the high-rate bonds issued during the war, to take advantage of the lower borrowing costs brought about by the peace and security that followed the Union victory. The Act was the subject of considerable debate over the exact rates and amounts, but once the differences were ironed out, it passed by large majorities in both houses. While Sherman was unhappy with the compromises (especially the extension of the bonds' term to 30 years, which he believed too long), he saw the bill as an improvement over the existing conditions and urged its passage.

=== Coinage Act of 1873 ===
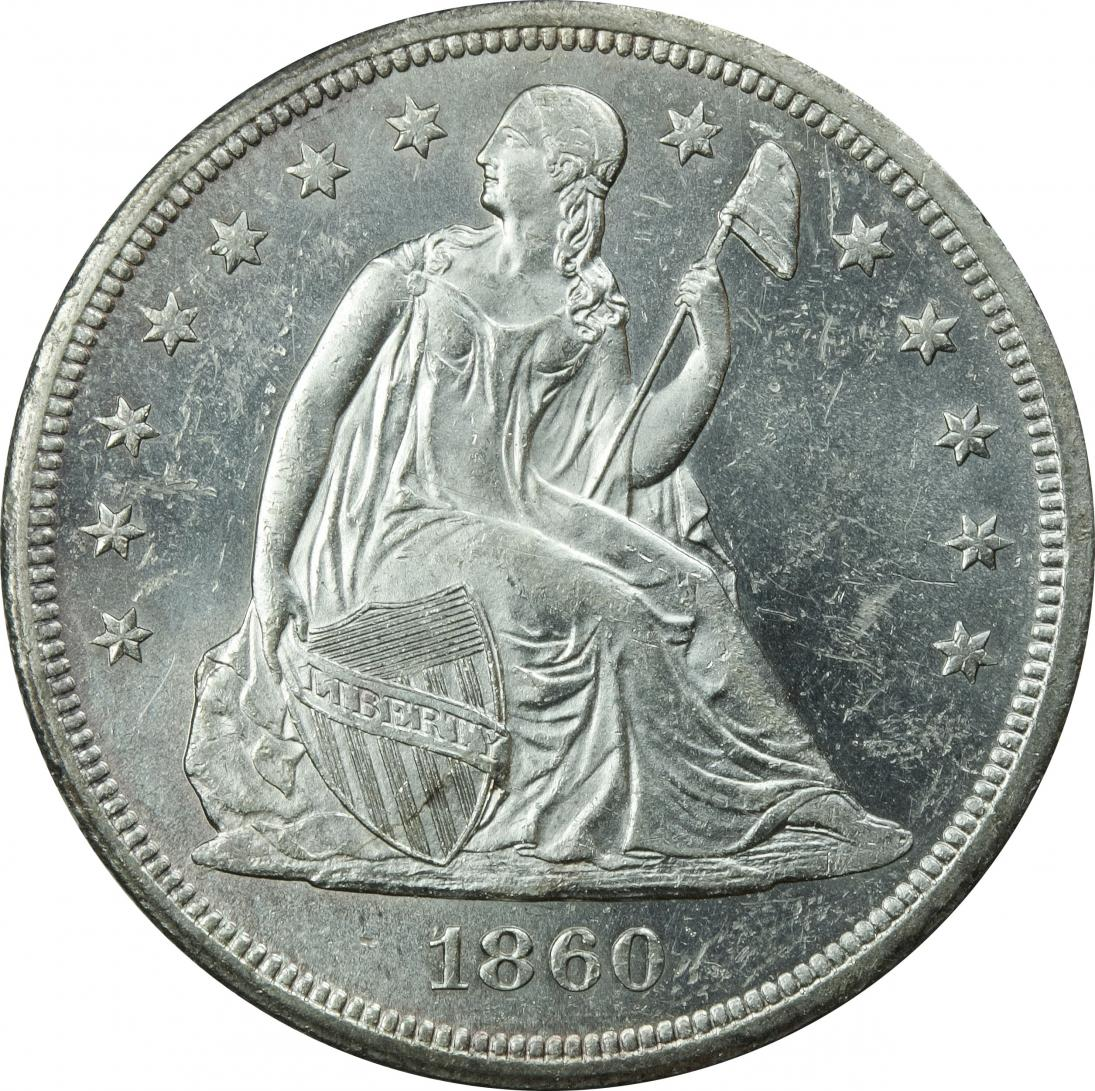
A silver dollar of the type Sherman said he never saw in circulation

The Ohio Legislature elected Sherman to a third term in 1872 after then-governor Rutherford B. Hayes declined the invitation of several legislators to run against Sherman. Sherman returned to his leadership of the Finance Committee, and the issues of greenbacks, gold, and silver continued into the next several congresses. Since the early days of the republic, the United States had minted both gold and silver coins, and for decades the ratio of value between them had been set by law at 16:1. Both metals were subject to "free coinage"; that is, anyone could bring any amount of silver or gold to the United States Mint and have it converted to coinage. The ratio was bound to be imperfect, as the amount of gold and silver mined and the demand for it around the world fluctuated from year to year; as a metal's market price exceeded its legal price, coins of that metal would disappear from circulation (a phenomenon known as Gresham's law). Before the Civil War, gold circulated freely and silver disappeared, and while silver dollars were legal tender, Sherman wrote that "[a]lthough I was quite active in business ... I do not remember at that time to have ever seen a silver dollar". The issuance of greenbacks had pushed debate over gold-silver ratios to the background as coins of both metals disappeared from the nation's commerce in favor of the new paper notes, but as the dollar became stronger in peacetime and the national debt payments were guaranteed to be paid in specie, Congress saw the need to update the coinage laws.

Grant's Treasury Secretary, George S. Boutwell, sent Sherman (who was by now Senate Finance Committee Chairman) a draft of what would become the Coinage Act of 1873. The list of legal coins duplicated that of the previous coinage act, leaving off only the silver dollar and two smaller coins. The rationale given in the Treasury report accompanying the draft bill was that to mint a gold dollar and a silver dollar with different intrinsic values was problematic; as the silver dollar did not circulate and the gold did, it made sense to drop the unused coin. (Note: The Act did introduce a new silver dollar, the Trade dollar, that was intended for overseas trade only, but was legal tender domestically for sums up to five dollars.) Opponents of the bill would later call this omission the "Crime of '73," and would mean it quite literally, circulating tales of widespread bribery of Congressmen by foreign agents. Sherman emphasized in his memoirs that the bill was openly debated for several years and passed both Houses with overwhelming support and that, given the continued circulation of smaller silver coins at the same 16:1 ratio, nothing had been "demonetized," as his opponents claimed. Silver was still legal tender, but only for sums up to five dollars. On the other hand, later scholars have suggested that Sherman and others wished to demonetize silver for years and move the country onto a gold-only standard of currency—not for some corrupt gain, but because they believed it was the path to a strong, secure currency.

In switching to what was essentially a gold standard, the United States joined a host of nations around the world that based their currencies on gold alone. But in doing so, these nations exacerbated the demand for gold as opposed to silver which, combined with more silver being mined, drove the cost of gold up and silver down. The result was not apparent immediately after the Coinage Act's passage, but by 1879 the ratio between the price of gold and that of silver had risen from 16.4:1 to 18.4:1; by 1896 it was 30:1. The ultimate effect was more expensive gold, which meant lower prices and deflation for other goods. The deflation made the effects of the Panic of 1873 worse, making it more expensive for debtors to pay debts they had contracted when currency was less valuable. Farmers and laborers, especially, clamored for the return of coinage in both metals, believing the increased money supply would restore wages and property values, and the divide between pro- and anti-silver forces grew in the decades to come. Writing in 1895, Sherman defended the bill, saying that, barring some international agreement to switch the entire world to a bimetallic standard, the United States dollar should remain a gold-backed currency.

=== Resumption of specie payments ===
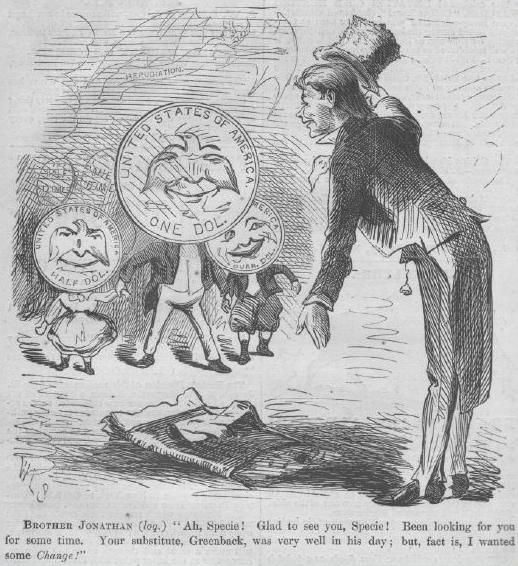
A cartoon from the April 9, 1870 issue of Harper's Weekly anticipates the resumption of government payments in precious-metal coins.

At the same time as he sought to reform the coinage, Sherman worked for "resumption"—the policy of resuming specie payment on all bank notes, including the greenbacks. The idea of withdrawing the greenbacks from circulation altogether had been tried and quickly rejected in 1866; the notes were, as Sherman said, "a great favorite of the people". The economic turmoil of the Panic of 1873 made it even more clear that shrinking the money supply would be harmful to the average American. Still, Sherman (and others) desired an eventual return to a single circulating medium: gold. As he said in an 1874 speech, "a specie standard is the best and the only true standard of all values, recognized as such by all civilized nations of our generation". If greenbacks were not to be withdrawn from circulation, therefore, they must be made equal to the gold dollar.

While Sherman stood against printing additional greenbacks, as late as 1872 he remained a proponent of keeping existing greenbacks backed by bonds in circulation. Over the next two years, Sherman worked to develop what became the Specie Payment Resumption Act. The Act was a compromise. It required gradual reduction of the maximum value of greenbacks allowed to circulate to $300 million (~$8.77 billion in 2025) (Note: The Act required that for every $100 increase in the circulation of gold-backed national bank notes, $80 in greenbacks should be withdrawn.) and, while earlier drafts had allowed the Treasury the choice between paying in bonds or coin, the final version of the Act required payment in specie, starting in 1879. The bill passed on a party-line vote in the lame duck session of the 43rd Congress, and President Grant signed it into law on January 14, 1875.

=== Election of 1876 ===
After the close of the session, Sherman returned to Ohio to campaign for the Republican nominee for governor there, former governor Rutherford B. Hayes. The issue of specie payments was debated in the campaign, with Hayes endorsing Sherman's position and his Democratic opponent, incumbent governor William Allen, in favor of increased circulation of greenbacks redeemable in bonds. Hayes won a narrow victory and was soon mentioned as a possible presidential candidate in 1876. The controversy over resumption carried into the presidential election. The Democratic platform that year demanded repeal of the Resumption Act, while the Republicans nominated Hayes, whose position in favor of a gold standard was well known. The election of 1876 was very close, and the electoral votes of several states were ardently disputed until mere days before the new president was to be inaugurated. Louisiana was one of the states in which both parties claimed victory, and Grant asked Sherman and a few other men to go to New Orleans and ensure the party's interests were represented.

Sherman, by this time thoroughly displeased with Grant and his administration, nonetheless took up the call in the name of party loyalty, joining James A. Garfield, Stanley Matthews, and other Republican politicians in Louisiana a few days later. The Democrats likewise sent their politicos, and the two sides met to observe the elections return board arrive at its decision that Hayes should be awarded their state's electoral votes. This ended Sherman's direct role in the matter, and he returned to Washington, but the dispute carried over until a bipartisan election commission was convened in the capital. A few days before Grant's term would end, the commission narrowly decided in Hayes's favor, and he became the 19th President of the United States.

== Secretary of the Treasury ==
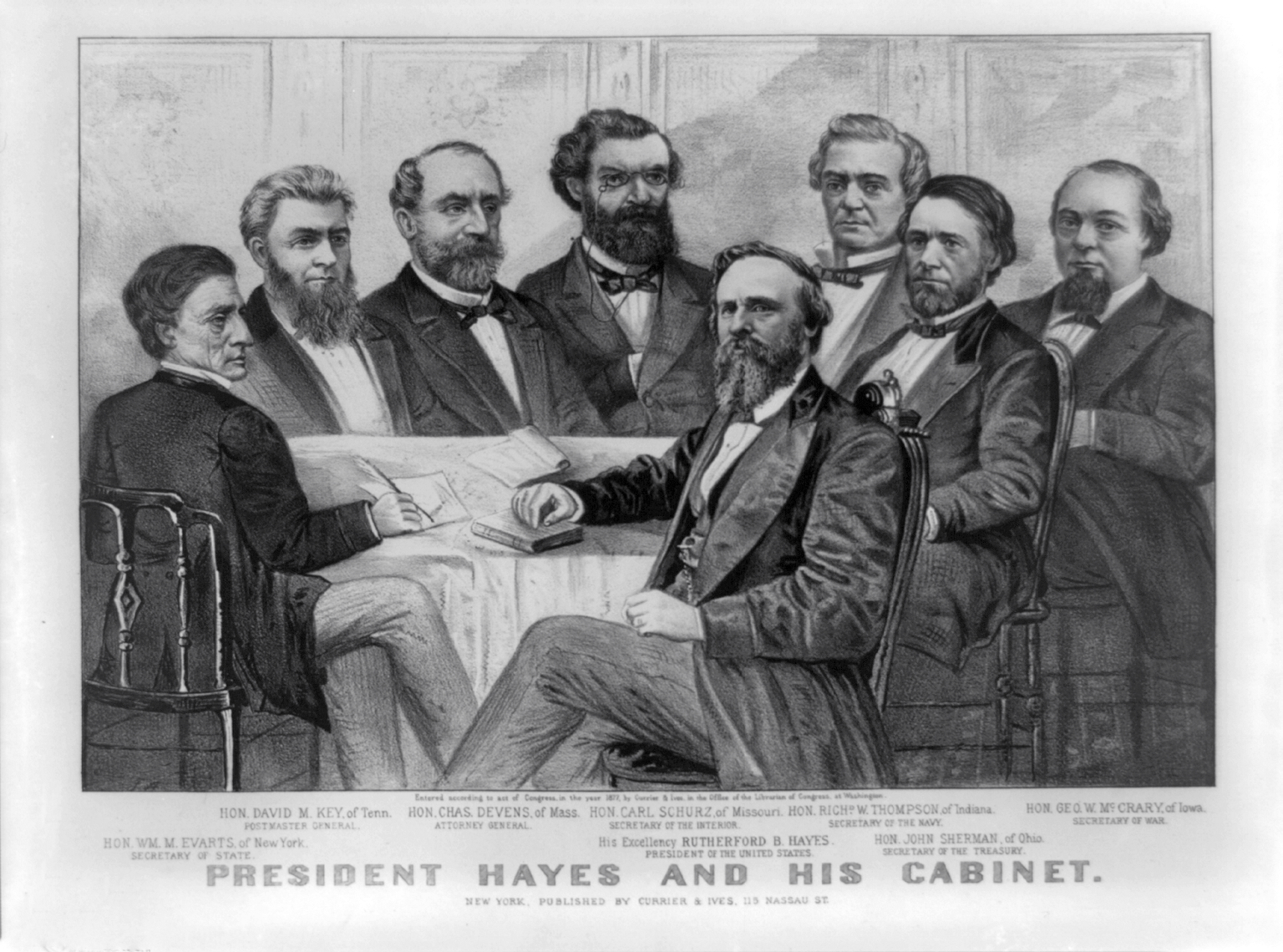
Hayes's cabinet in 1877

Sherman's financial expertise and his friendship with Hayes made him a natural choice for Treasury Secretary in 1877. Like Grant before him, Hayes had not consulted party leaders about his cabinet appointments, and the Senate took the then-unusual step of referring all of them to committee. Two days later, senators approved Sherman's nomination after an hour of debate, and he began lobbying his former colleagues to approve the other nominations, which they eventually did. Hayes and Sherman became close friends in the next four years, taking regular carriage rides together to discuss matters of state in private. In the Treasury, as in the Senate, Sherman was confronted with two tasks: first, to prepare for specie resumption when it took effect in 1879; second, to deal with the backlash against the diminution of silver coinage.

=== Preparing for specie resumption ===
Sherman and Hayes agreed to stockpile gold in preparation for the exchange of greenbacks for specie. The Act remained unpopular in some quarters, leading to four attempts to repeal it in the Senate and fourteen in the House—all unsuccessful. By this time, public confidence in the Treasury had grown to the extent that a dollar in gold was worth only $1.05 in greenbacks. Once the public was confident that they could redeem greenbacks for gold, few actually did so; when the Act took effect in 1879, only $130,000 out of the $346,000,000 outstanding dollars in greenbacks were redeemed. Greenbacks were now at parity with gold dollars, and the nation had, for the first time since the Civil War, a unified monetary system.

=== Bland–Allison Act ===
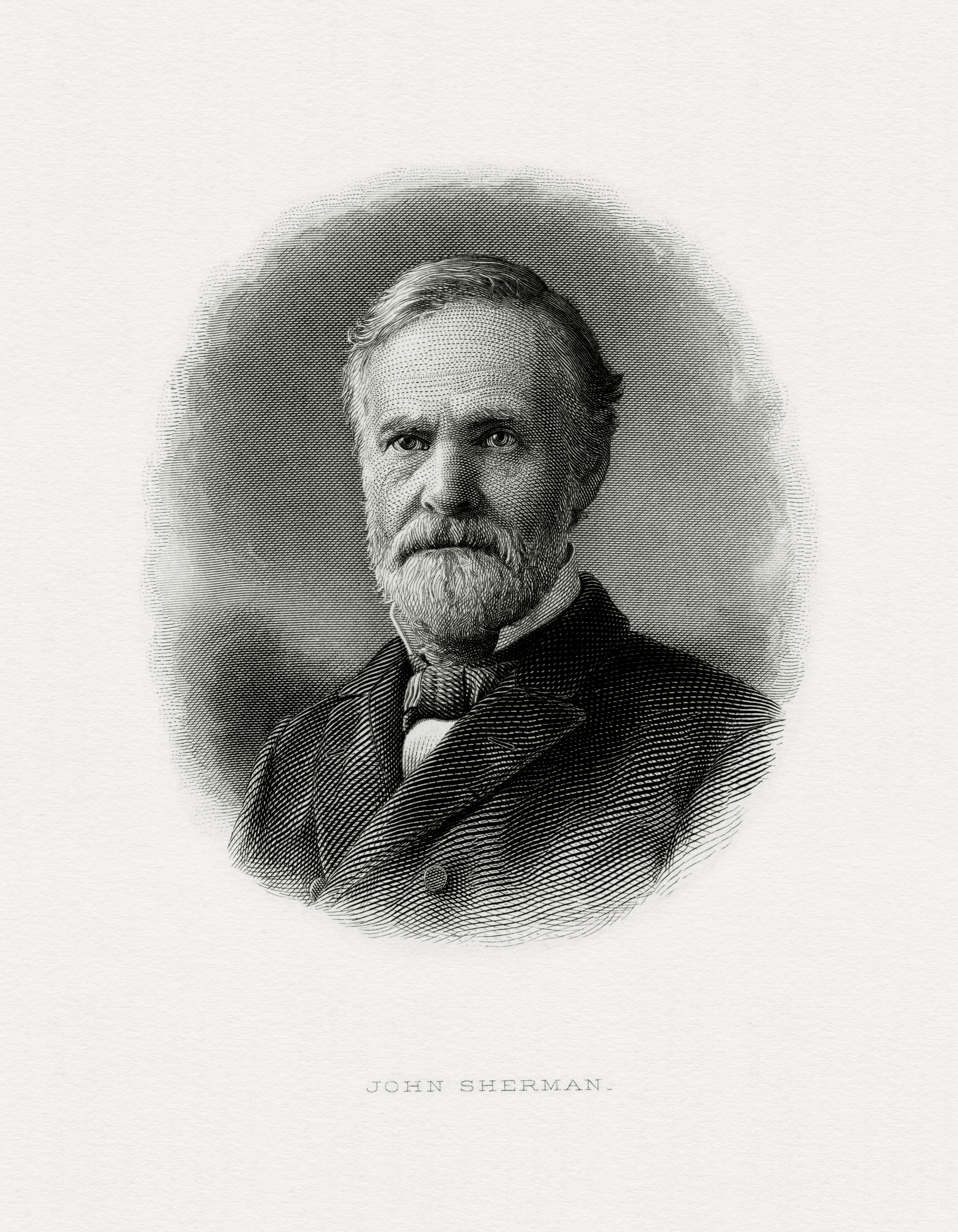
Bureau of Engraving and Printing portrait of Sherman as Secretary of the Treasury

Sentiment against the Coinage Act of 1873 gained strength as the economy worsened following the Panic of 1873. Democratic Representative Richard P. Bland of Missouri proposed a bill that would require the United States buy as much silver as miners could sell the government and strike it into coins, a system that would increase the money supply and aid debtors. In short, silver miners would sell the government metal worth fifty to seventy cents and receive back a silver dollar. The pro-silver idea cut across party lines, and William B. Allison, a Republican from Iowa, led the effort in the Senate. Allison offered an amendment in the Senate requiring the purchase of two to four million dollars per month of silver, but not allowing private deposit of silver at the mints. Thus the seignorage, or the difference between the face value of the coin and the worth of the metal contained within it, accrued to the government's credit, not private citizens. The resulting Bland–Allison Act passed both houses of Congress in 1878. Hayes feared that the act would cause inflation through the expansion of the money supply that would be ruinous to business. Sherman's opinion was more complicated. He knew that silver was gaining popularity, and opposing it might harm the party's candidates in the 1880 elections, but he also agreed with Hayes in wanting to avoid inflation.

Sherman pressured his friends in the Senate to defeat the bill, or to limit it to production of a larger silver dollar, which would actually be worth 1/16th its weight in gold. These efforts were unsuccessful, but Allison's amendment made the bill less financially risky. Sherman thought Hayes should sign the amended bill but did not press the matter, and the President vetoed it. "In view of the strong public sentiment in favor of the free coinage of the silver dollar", he later wrote, "I thought it better to make no objections to the passage of the bill, but I did not care to antagonize the wishes of the President." Congress overrode Hayes's veto and the bill became law. The effects of the Bland–Allison Act were limited: the premium on gold over silver continued to grow, and financial conditions in the country continued to improve.

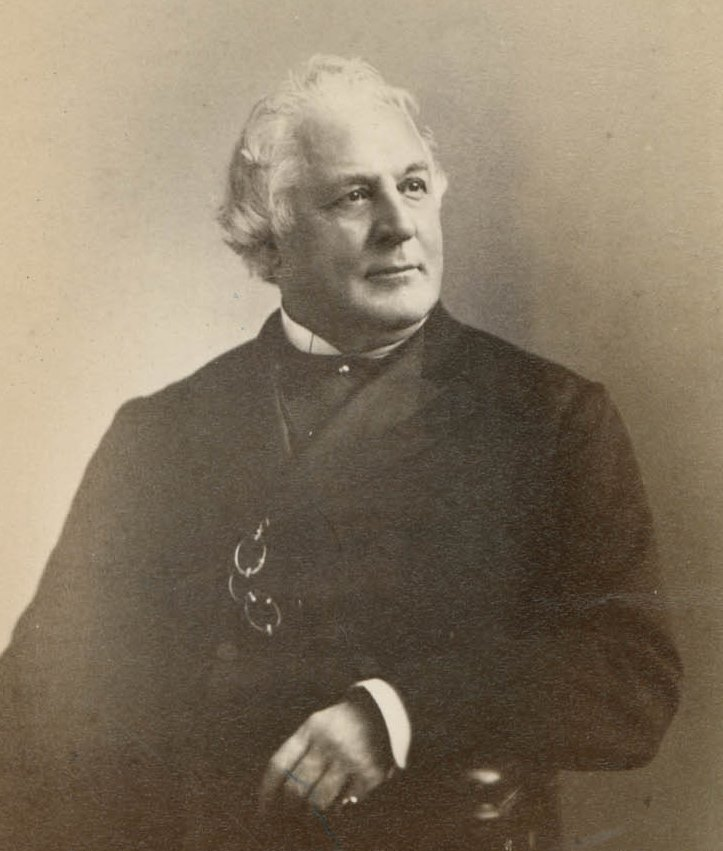
Sherman appointed John Jay to investigate corruption in the New York Custom House.

=== Civil service reform ===
Hayes took office determined to reform the system of civil service appointments, which had been based on the spoils system since Andrew Jackson was president forty years earlier. Sherman was not a civil service reformer, but he went along with Hayes's instructions. The foremost enemy of reform—and Hayes—was New York senator Roscoe Conkling, and it was to Conkling's spoilsmen that Hayes first turned his attention. At Hayes's direction, Sherman ordered John Jay to investigate the New York Custom House, which was stacked with Conkling's appointees. Jay's report suggested that the New York Custom House was so overstaffed with political appointees that 20% of the employees were expendable.

Hayes issued an executive order that forbade federal office holders from being required to make campaign contributions or otherwise taking part in party politics. Chester A. Arthur, the Collector of the Port of New York, and his subordinates Alonzo B. Cornell and George H. Sharpe, all Conkling supporters, refused to obey the president's order. Sherman agreed with Hayes that the three had to resign, but he made clear in a letter to Arthur that he had no personal grudge against the Collector. In September 1877, Hayes demanded the three men's resignations, which they refused to give. He submitted appointments to the Senate for confirmation as their replacements but the Senate's Commerce Committee, which Conkling chaired, voted unanimously to reject the nominees.

During a congressional recess in July 1878, Hayes finally sacked Arthur and Cornell (Sharpe's term had expired) and appointed replacements. When Congress reconvened, Sherman pressured his former Senate colleagues to confirm the President's replacement nominees, which they did after considerable debate. Jay and other reformers criticized Sherman the next year when he traveled to New York to speak on Cornell's behalf in his campaign for governor of New York. Sherman replied that it was important that the Republican party win the election there, despite their intra-party differences. His friendliness may also have related, as Arthur's biographer Thomas C. Reeves suggests, to a desire to keep Conkling's New York machine friendly to him as the 1880 presidential election approached.

== Election of 1880 ==
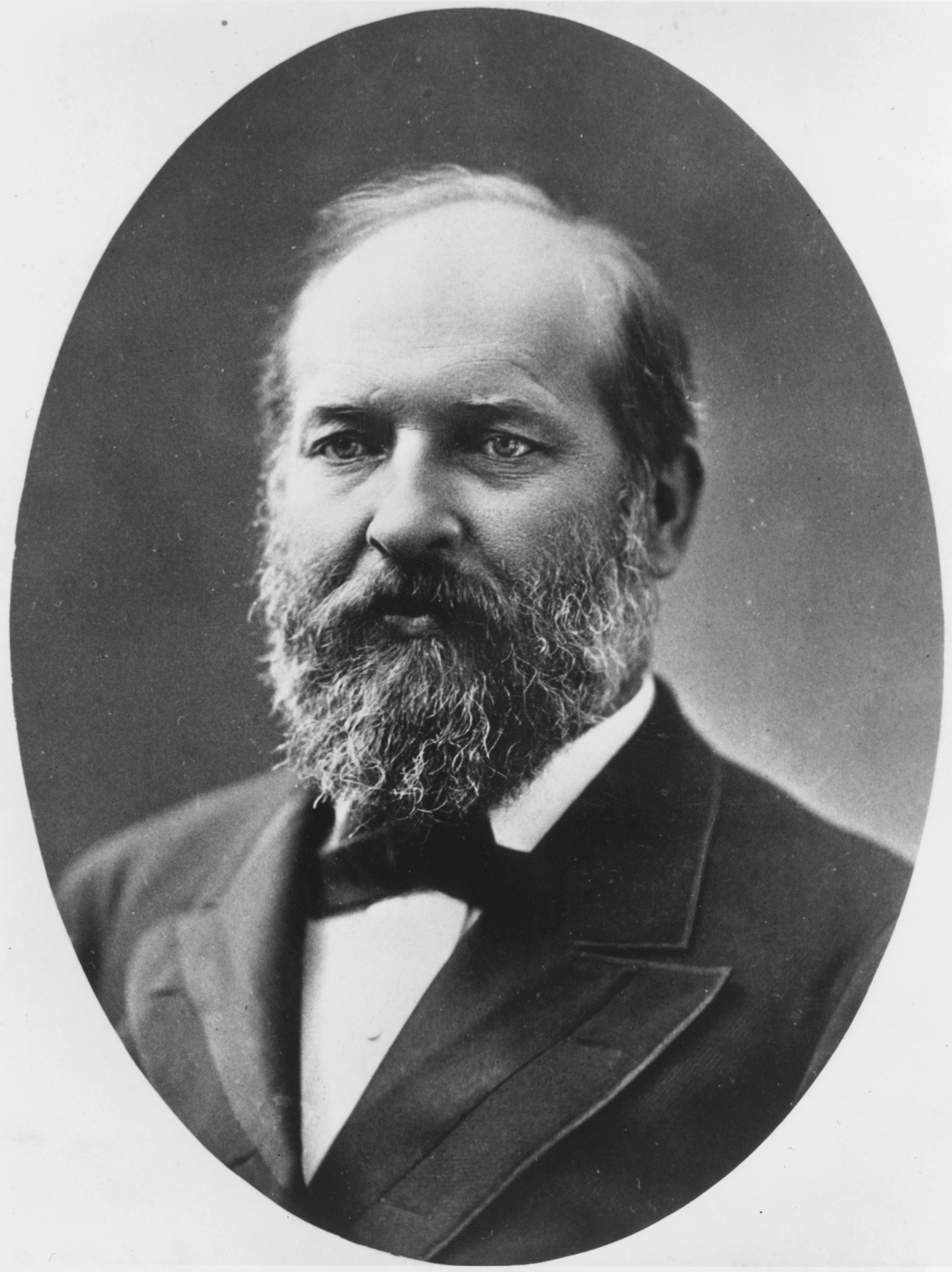
James A. Garfield emerged the unexpected nominee at the 1880 Republican National Convention.

Hayes had pledged himself to a one-term presidency, and the Republican nomination in 1880 attracted many candidates, including Sherman. Hayes's preference was for Sherman to succeed him, but he made no official endorsement, and he did not think Sherman could win the nomination. Among the early favorites for the nomination were former president Grant, Senator James G. Blaine of Maine, and Senator George F. Edmunds of Vermont. Grant did not actively promote his candidacy, but his entry into the race energized his partisans, and when the convention met in Chicago in June 1880, they instantly divided the delegates into Grant and anti-Grant factions, with Blaine the most popular choice of the latter group. After Grant and Blaine had been nominated, James Garfield nominated Sherman with an eloquent speech, saying "You ask for his monuments, I point you to twenty-five years of national statutes. Not one great beneficent statute has been placed in our statute books without his intelligent and powerful aid." The speech, while heartfelt, was not particularly stirring. As Senator George Frisbie Hoar later explained, "[t]here was nothing stimulant or romantic in the plain wisdom of John Sherman".

After the other candidates had been nominated, the first ballot showed Grant leading with 304 votes and Blaine in second with 284; Sherman's 93 placed him in a distant third, and no candidate had the required majority of 379. Sherman's delegates could swing the nomination to either Grant or Blaine, but he refused to release them through twenty-eight ballots in the hope that the anti-Grant forces would desert Blaine and flock to him. By the end of the first day, it was clear that neither Grant nor Blaine could muster a majority; a compromise candidate would be necessary. Sherman held out hope that he would be that compromise candidate, but while his vote tally reached as high as 120, he never commanded even all of Ohio's delegates. His divided home-state support was likely fatal to his cause, as Blaine delegates, searching for a new champion, did not think Sherman would make a popular candidate. After several days of balloting, Blaine's men found their compromise candidate, but instead of Sherman they shifted their votes to his fellow Ohioan, Garfield. By the thirty-sixth ballot, Garfield had 399 votes, enough for victory.

Sherman was respected among his fellow Republicans for his intelligence and hard work, but there were always doubts about his potential as a national candidate. As one author described him, Sherman was "thin as a rail, over six feet high, with close cropped beard and possessed of bad teeth and a divine laugh, when he laughs". His public speeches were adequate and informative, but never "of a sort to arouse a warm feeling for John Sherman, the man." Unlike Blaine or Conkling, Sherman "communicated no colorful personality, no magnetic current". His nickname, "the Ohio Icicle," deserved or not, hindered his presidential ambitions.

Garfield placated the pro-Grant faction by endorsing Chester A. Arthur as nominee for Vice President. Despite his good relations with Arthur in 1879, Sherman thought the choice a bad one: "The nomination of Arthur is a ridiculous burlesque," he wrote in a letter to a friend, "and I am afraid was inspired by a desire to defeat the ticket ... His nomination attaches to the ticket all the odium of machine politics, and will greatly endanger the success of Garfield." He was nearly correct, as Garfield eked out a narrow victory over the Democratic nominee Winfield Scott Hancock. Sherman continued at the Treasury for the rest of Hayes's term, leaving office March 3, 1881.

== Return to the Senate ==
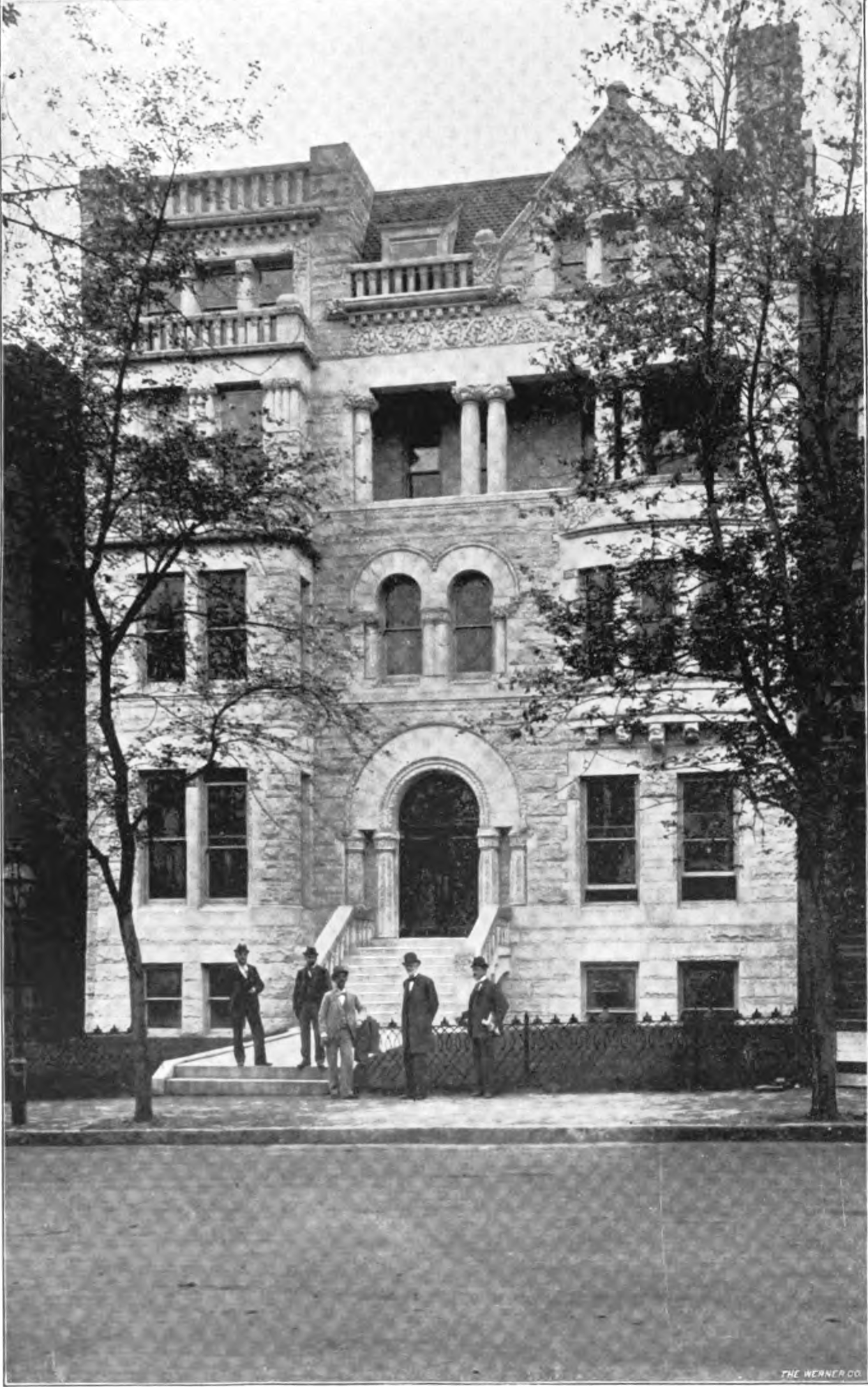
While serving in the Senate, Sherman lived in this house at 1323 K St. NW, Washington, D.C.

The Ohio legislature had elected Garfield to the Senate in 1880, and when he was elected president before taking his seat, they elected Sherman in his place. Sherman's position in the Senate changed after his four-year absence. He rejoined the Finance Committee, but Justin Smith Morrill, his old House colleague, now held the chairmanship. When Sherman re-entered the Senate in the 47th United States Congress, the Republicans were not in the majority. The Senate was divided among 37 Republicans, 37 Democrats, one independent (David Davis) who caucused with the Democrats, and one Readjuster (William Mahone), who caucused with the Republicans. Arthur's tie-breaking vote as vice president left the Republicans with a narrow hold on the chamber. Even so, the special session convened in March 1881 remained deadlocked for two months over Garfield's nominations because of Conkling's opposition to some of them, resulting in the resignation of Conkling and the other senator from New York, Thomas C. Platt, in protest of Garfield's continuing opposition to their faction. Sherman sided with Garfield on the appointments and was pleased when the New York legislature declined to reelect Conkling and Platt, replacing them with two less troublesome Republicans.

=== Garfield's assassination and the Pendleton Act ===
After the special session of Congress had adjourned, Sherman returned home to Mansfield. He spoke on behalf of Ohio governor Charles Foster's effort for a second term and went to Kenyon College with ex-President Hayes, where he received an honorary degree. Sherman looked forward to staying with his wife at home for an extended period for the first time in years, when news arrived that Garfield had been shot in Washington. The gunman, Charles J. Guiteau, was a deranged office-seeker who believed that Garfield's successor would appoint him to a patronage job. After lingering for two months, Garfield died, and Arthur became president. After completing a long-planned visit to Yellowstone National Park and other Western sites with his brother William, Sherman returned to a second special session of Congress in October 1881.

Garfield's assassination by an office-seeker amplified the public demand for civil service reform. Both Democratic and Republican leaders realized that they could attract the votes of reformers by turning against the spoils system, and by 1882 a bipartisan effort began in favor of reform. In the previous Congress, Sherman's fellow Ohio senator, Democrat George H. Pendleton, had introduced legislation that required selection of civil servants based on merit as determined by an examination, but Congress declined to act on it right away. Republicans lost seats in the 1882 congressional elections, in which Democrats campaigned on the reform issue, and in the lame duck session were more amenable to civil service reform. Sherman spoke in favor of merit selection and against removing employees from office without cause. He was against the idea that civil servants should have unlimited terms of office but believed that efficiency, not political activity, should determine an employee's length of service. Sherman voted in favor of Pendleton's bill, and the Senate approved it 38–5. The House concurred by a vote of 155–47. Arthur signed the Pendleton Civil Service Reform Act into law on January 16, 1883.

=== Mongrel Tariff ===
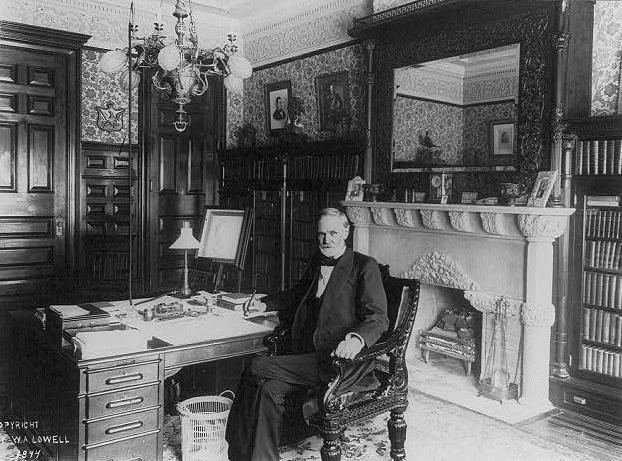
Sherman in his Senate office, about 1894

There was relatively little financial legislation in the 1880s. By that time, fewer bonds were necessary, as the government now ran a consistent surplus which by 1882 reached $145 million (~$4.17 billion in 2025). Opinions varied on how to balance the budget; Democrats wished to lower tariffs to reduce revenues and the cost of imported goods, while Republicans believed that high tariffs ensured high wages in manufacturing and mining. They preferred the government spend more on internal improvements and reduce excise taxes. Congress passed a law creating a committee to study tariff reduction, but Arthur appointed mostly protectionists to it. In December 1882, the committee submitted a report to Congress calling for tariff cuts averaging between 20 and 25%. The commission's recommendations were ignored, as the House Ways and Means Committee, dominated by protectionists, provided a 10% reduction. After conference with the Senate, the bill that emerged only reduced tariffs by an average of 1.47%; it also removed or reduce many excise taxes. Sherman supported the bill, more for the excise reduction than for the tariff changes. The bill, known as the Tariff of 1883 (or, by detractors, as the "Mongrel Tariff"), passed both houses narrowly on March 3, 1883, the last full day of the 47th Congress; Arthur signed the measure into law, but it had no effect on the surplus.

=== Chinese immigration ===
Sherman paid greater attention to foreign affairs during the second half of his Senate career, serving as chairman of the Committee on Foreign Relations. In 1868, the Senate had ratified the Burlingame Treaty with China, allowing unrestricted immigration from China. After the Panic of 1873, Chinese immigrants were blamed for depressing wages; in reaction, Congress in 1879 passed the Chinese Exclusion Act, but Hayes vetoed it. Now, three years later, after China had agreed to treaty revisions, Congress tried again to exclude Chinese immigrants: Senator John F. Miller of California introduced another Exclusion Act that denied Chinese immigrants United States citizenship and banned their immigration for a twenty-year period. Sherman opposed both the 1880 treaty revisions and the bill Miller proposed, believing that the Exclusion Act reversed the United States' traditional welcoming of all people and the country's dependence on foreign immigration for growth. President Arthur vetoed the bill, and Sherman voted to sustain the veto. A new Exclusion Act passed to conform to Arthur's objections. Sherman voted against this bill, too, but it passed, and Arthur signed it into law. In 1885, Sherman voted in favor of the Alien Contract Labor Law, which barred engaging in a labor contract before immigrating or transporting a person under such a contract to the United States. Sherman saw this Act as a more appropriate solution to depressed wages than Chinese exclusion: the problem, as he saw it, was not the national origin of Chinese immigrants, but their employment under serf-like conditions.

=== Further presidential ambitions ===
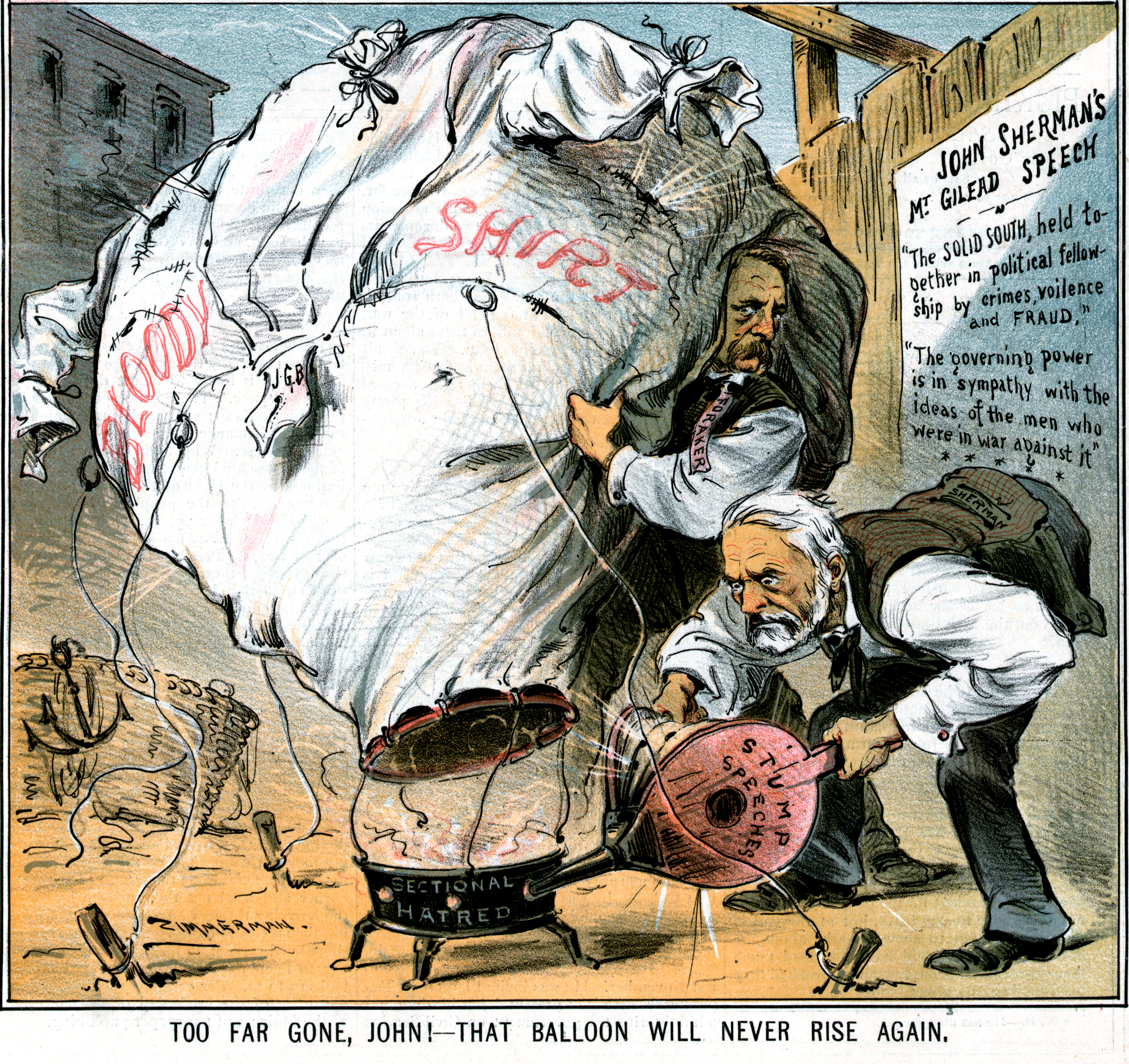
An 1885 political cartoon accuses Sherman and Foraker of fanning section hatred for political gain.

In 1884, Sherman again ran for the Republican nomination, but his campaign never gained steam. Blaine was considered the favorite and President Arthur also gathered delegates in an attempt to win the term in his own right. Again, the Ohio delegation failed to unite behind Sherman, and he entered the convention with only 30 total delegates pledged to him. Former Cincinnati judge Joseph B. Foraker gave a speech nominating Sherman, but it drew little attention. Blaine gathered support the next day, and Sherman withdrew after the fourth ballot. Blaine was duly nominated and went on to lose the election to Democrat Grover Cleveland of New York, the Republicans' first loss in 28 years. Sherman returned to the Senate where, in 1885, he was elected President pro tempore of the Senate. After the death of Vice President Thomas A. Hendricks later that year, Sherman was next in line to the presidency until February 26, 1887, when he resigned the position.

In 1886, the Ohio legislature elected Sherman to a fifth term but, before long, he was considering another run for the presidency. To broaden his national image, he traveled to Nashville to give a speech defending Republican principles. He encouraged fairness in the treatment of black Americans and denounced their mistreatment at the hands of the "redeemed" Southern state governments. The tour had its effect, and Sherman's hopes were high. His old friend, ex-President Hayes, thought him the best candidate. The early favorite for the nomination was again Blaine, but after Blaine wrote several letters denying any interest in the nomination, his supporters divided among other candidates, including Sherman. With no clear consensus going into the 1888 convention, delegates divided their support among an unusual number of favorite sons. Daniel H. Hastings of Pennsylvania placed Sherman's name in nomination, seconded by Foraker (who was, by then, Governor of Ohio). Sherman, at last, had a unified Ohio delegation behind him and led on the first ballot with 229 votes—more than double his nearest competitor, but well short of the 416 needed for nomination. Walter Q. Gresham of Indiana was in second place with 111, followed by Russell A. Alger of Michigan with 84. Sherman gained votes on the second ballot, but plateaued there; by the fifth ballot, it was clear that he would gain no more delegates. He refused to withdraw, but his supporters began to abandon him; by the eighth ballot, the delegates coalesced around Benjamin Harrison of Indiana and voted him the nomination. Sherman thought Harrison was a good candidate and bore him no ill will, but he did begrudge Alger, whom he believed "purchased the votes of many of the delegates from the southern states who had been instructed by their conventions to vote for me". A loyal Republican, Sherman gave speeches for Harrison in Ohio and Indiana and was pleased with his victory over Cleveland that November. After 1888, Sherman, aware that he would be seventy-three years old when the nomination was next open, resolved that from then on "no temptation of office will induce me to seek further political honors" and did not run for president again.

=== Interstate commerce ===
For some time, there had been concern about the power of the railroads and the way they charged different rates for different customers. In 1885, a bill to regulate the practice, authored by John Henninger Reagan of Texas passed the House. The Reagan bill forbade discrimination in railroad or pipeline freight rates, required that rates be reasonable, and fixed maximum charges allowed. Sherman agreed with the general idea of the law, but objected to certain portions, especially a provision that gave state courts jurisdiction over enforcement disputes. Sherman believed the law should allow for more nuance as well, insisting that competition against other forms of transit be considered. These changes were adopted in the conference committee and the result, the Interstate Commerce Act of 1887, owed much to Sherman's influence. Cleveland signed it into law on February 4, 1887, and appointed members to the new Interstate Commerce Commission. The act displeased the railroad industry, but was a boon to farmers and the oil industry.

=== Sherman Antitrust Act ===
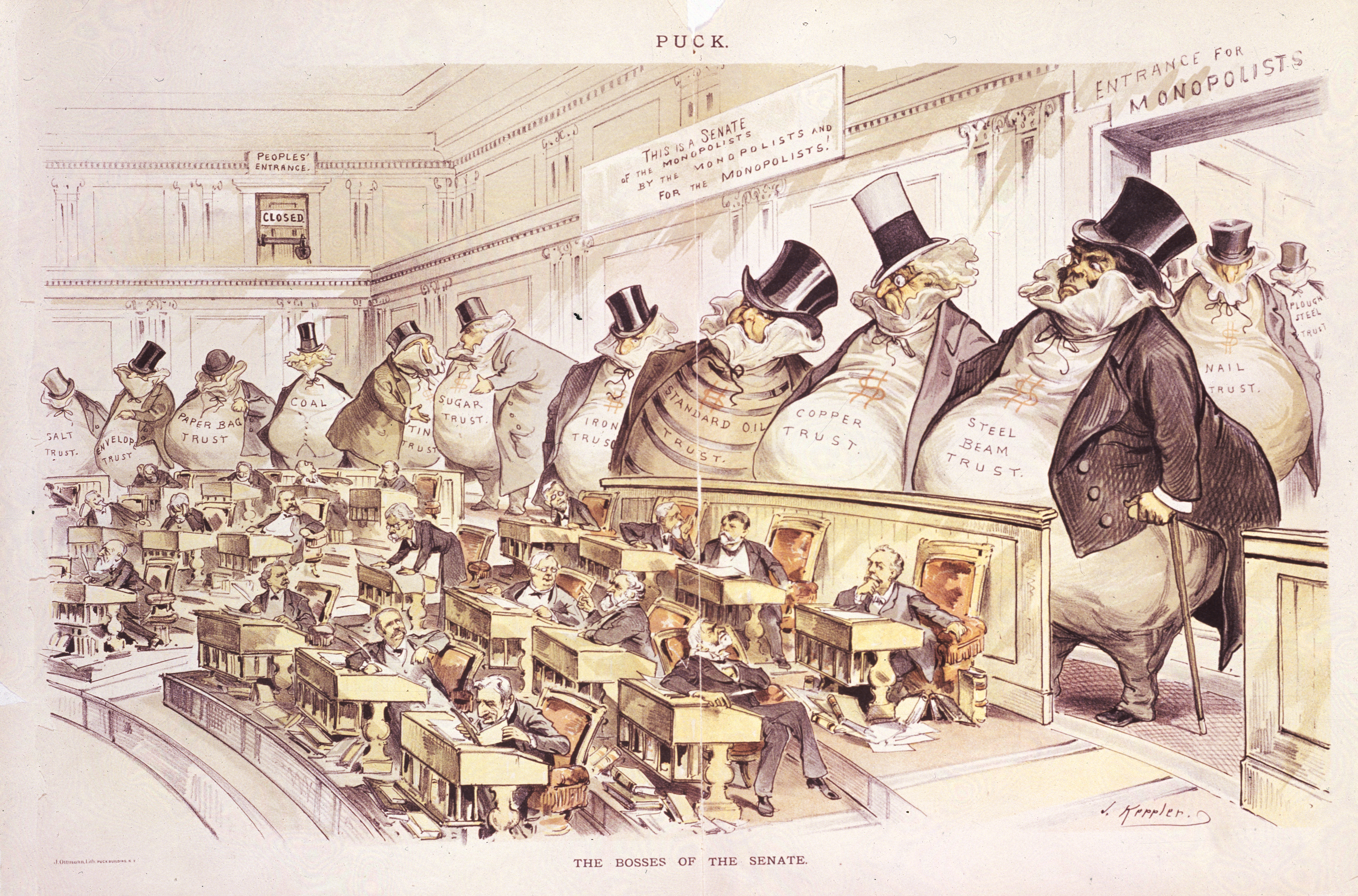
An 1889 cartoon suggests that the monopolies held too much power over Congress.

By the late nineteenth century, businesses began to form combinations, known as trusts, which claimed a larger and larger share of the market—large enough to dictate prices, their detractors claimed. Members of both major parties were concerned with the growth of the power of trusts and monopolies, and at the opening of the 51st Congress Sherman proposed what would become the Sherman Antitrust Act. The bill Sherman proposed was largely derivative of a failed bill from the previous Congress written by Senator George F. Edmunds, which Sherman had amended during its consideration. Until 1888, Sherman had shown little interest in the trust question but it was rising in the national consciousness, and Sherman now entered the fray. The revised bill Sherman proposed was simple, stating that "[e]very contract, combination in the form of trust or otherwise, or conspiracy, in restraint of trade or commerce among the several States, or with foreign nations, is declared to be illegal". (Note: Now codified at 15 U.S.C. § 1.) The bill further prescribed criminal penalties for any person who monopolizes trade. (Note: Now codified at 15 U.S.C. § 2.) In debate, Sherman praised the effects of corporations on developing industry and railroads and asserted the right for people to form corporations, so long as they were "not in any sense a monopoly".

The bill passed the Senate by an overwhelming 52–1 vote and passed the House without dissent. President Harrison signed the bill into law on July 2, 1890. When Harrison signed the Act, he remarked, "John Sherman has fixed General Alger." Sherman was the prime mover in getting the bill passed and became "by far the most articulate spokesman for antitrust in Congress". The Act was later criticized for its simple language and lack of defined terms, but Sherman defended it, saying that it drew on common-law language and precedents. He also denied that the Act was anti-business at all, saying that it only opposed unfair business practices. Sherman emphasized that the Act aimed not at lawful competition, but at illegal combination. The later analysis was more generous: "The Sherman Act was as good an antitrust law as the Congress of 1890 could have devised."

=== Silver Purchase Act ===
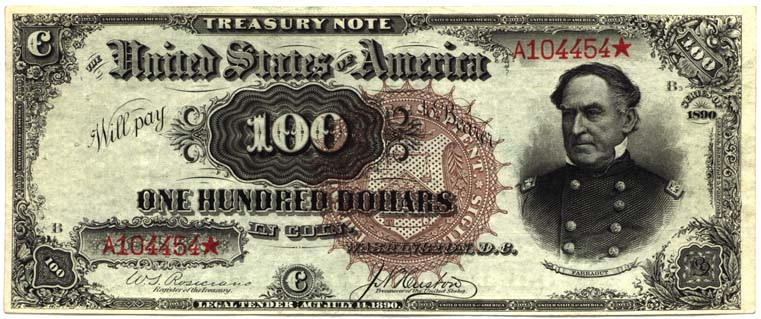
A $100 Treasury Note, authorized by the Sherman Silver Purchase Act, redeemable in gold or silver coin

Since the passage of the Bland–Allison Act in 1878, there had been little discussion of gold versus silver coinage. Silver had been hardly mentioned in the 1888 campaign, and Harrison's exact position on the issue was initially unclear, but his appointment of a silverite Treasury Secretary, William Windom, encouraged the free silver supporters. Silver supporters' numbers had grown in Congress with the addition of new Western states. The drop in agricultural prices, which made farmers' debts harder to pay, broadened their cause's appeal. Harrison attempted to steer a middle course between the two positions, advocating a free coinage of silver, but at its own value, not at a fixed ratio to gold. This served only to disappoint both factions. Windom suggested keeping the Bland–Allison system, but doubling the amount of silver allowed to be coined. The intrinsic value of the silver dollar had fallen to 72.3 cents, but Windom believed (though gold supporters doubted) that coining more silver would increase demand and raise its value. Harrison was willing to sign whatever bill would satisfy the largest group of people, as long as it did not make the currency unsound.

Both Houses of Congress were majority-Republican, but their solutions differed. The House passed a bill in June 1890 requiring the government to purchase 4.5 million ounces of silver each month (in addition to the $2–4 million required to be coined under Bland–Allison). The Senate passed a bill by Republican Preston B. Plumb of Kansas for free coinage of silver at the legal (16:1) ratio. Sherman voted against Plumb's bill, but was appointed to the conference committee to produce a compromise bill that, now called the Sherman Silver Purchase Act, passed that July. The Treasury would buy 4.5 million ounces of silver and would issue Treasury Notes to pay for it, which would be redeemable in gold or silver. The law also provided that the Treasury could coin more silver dollars if the Secretary believed it necessary to redeem the new notes. Sherman thought the bill was the least harmful option. Harrison believed it would end the controversy, and he signed it into law. The effect of the bill, however, was the increased depletion of the nation's gold supply.

In 1893, a financial panic struck the stock market, and the nation soon faced an acute economic depression. The panic was worsened by the acute shortage of gold that resulted from the increased coinage of silver, and President Cleveland, who had replaced Harrison that March, called Congress into session and demanded repeal of the part of the Act requiring the government to purchase silver. The effects of the panic had driven more moderates to support repeal; even so, the silverites rallied their following at a convention in Chicago, and the House debated for fifteen weeks before passing the repeal by a considerable margin. In the Senate, the repeal of silver purchase was equally contentious, but Cleveland convinced enough Democrats to stand by him that they, along with eastern Republicans, formed a 48–37 majority. Sherman voted for repeal of "his" bill. After repeal, depletion of the Treasury's gold reserves continued, but at a lesser rate and subsequent bond issues replenished supplies of gold. Academic debate continues over the efficacy of the bond issues, but the consensus is that the repeal of the Silver Purchase Act was, at worst, unharmful and, at best, useful in restoring the nation's financial health.

=== Final years in the Senate ===
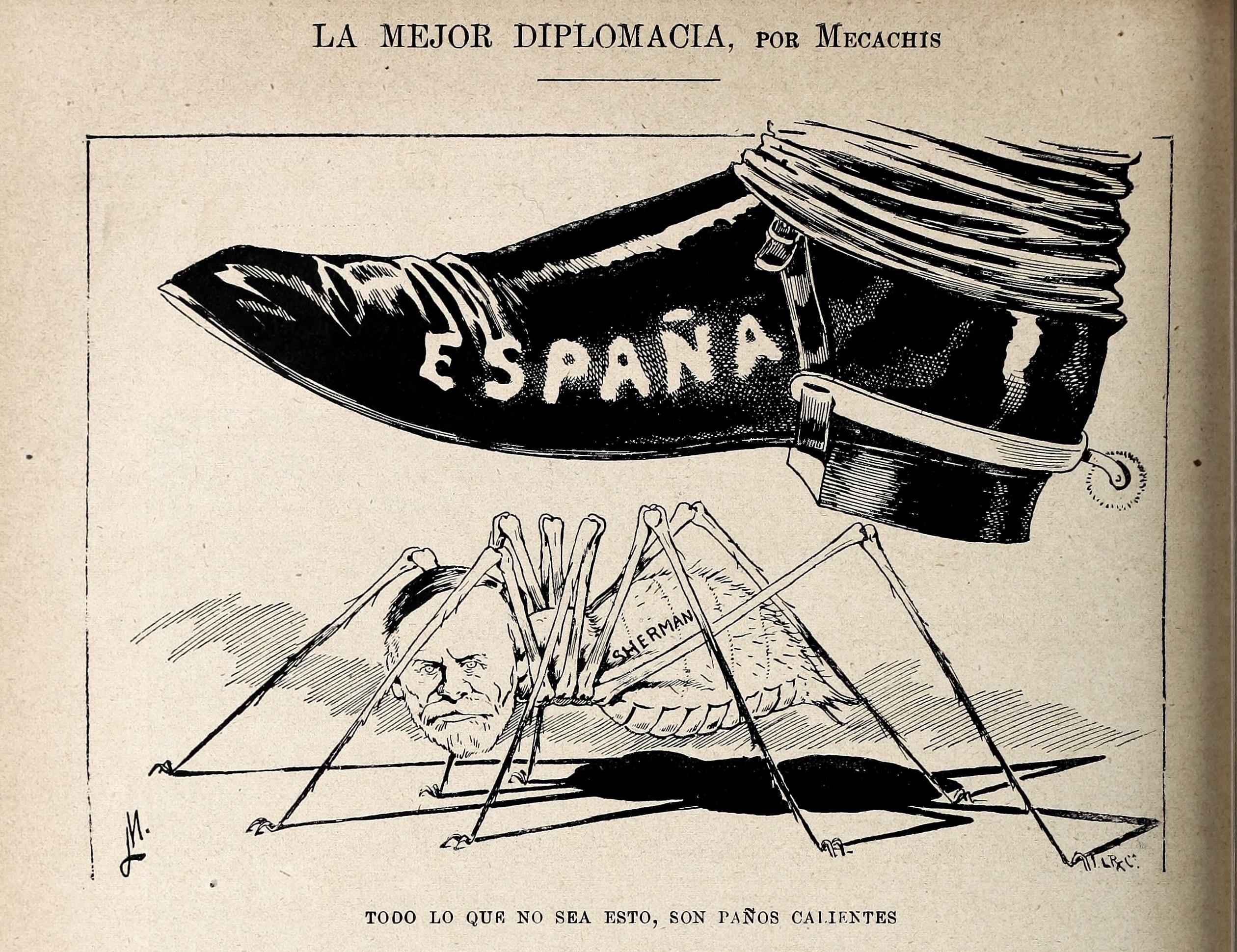
Caricature by Mecachis published in Blanco y Negro (March 21, 1896) depicting Sherman, then Chair of the Senate Foreign Relations Committee, and the suggestion for the kind of diplomacy that should be enacted by Spain.

Sherman was elected in 1892 to a sixth term, easily defeating the Democratic candidate in the state legislature. The more difficult fight had been for the Republican caucus's vote, as many preferred Foraker to Sherman. With assistance from Cleveland businessman Mark Hanna, and after four days of balloting, the caucus agreed to support Sherman over Foraker, and he was reelected by the full legislature on January 12, 1893. In 1894, Sherman surpassed Thomas Hart Benton's record for longest tenure in the Senate. (Note: Sherman's record was broken by William B. Allison in 1905. The current record for longest Senate service is held by Robert Byrd.) His memoirs, Recollections of Forty Years in the House, Senate and Cabinet, were published the following year. In 1896 he gave speeches on behalf of fellow Ohioan William McKinley in his campaign for the presidency, but took a lesser role than in previous campaigns because of his advanced age. McKinley was elected over Democrat William Jennings Bryan.

Sherman became known as a "friend of England" in Washington DC. He frequently made reference to British history in his speeches. Sherman believed there was a lot America could learn from England as an example with respects to economic systems, railroads and governance, and he was fond of highlighting the English origins of American political thought. While a sitting senator, Sherman travelled to the United Kingdom where he met with William Ewart Gladstone who at the time was the prime minister of the United Kingdom. He also met with John Bright and attended a speech given by Benjamin Disraeli. He returned even more convinced than he already had been that it was "in America's interests to pursue a close and amiable relationship with Great Britain." Winfield Scott Kerr wrote that "John Bright was in many respects the same type of statesman as John Sherman. A great speaker, and yet simple, direct and unostentatious to a degree approaching plainness." Out of all of the British statesmen who Sherman met overseas he was "most impressed" with John Bright, who was "in the prime of his strong, rugged, simple manhood" when Sherman met him.

Wishing to see the appointment of Hanna, his friend and political manager, to the Senate, McKinley created a vacancy by appointing Sherman to his cabinet as Secretary of State.

== Secretary of State ==
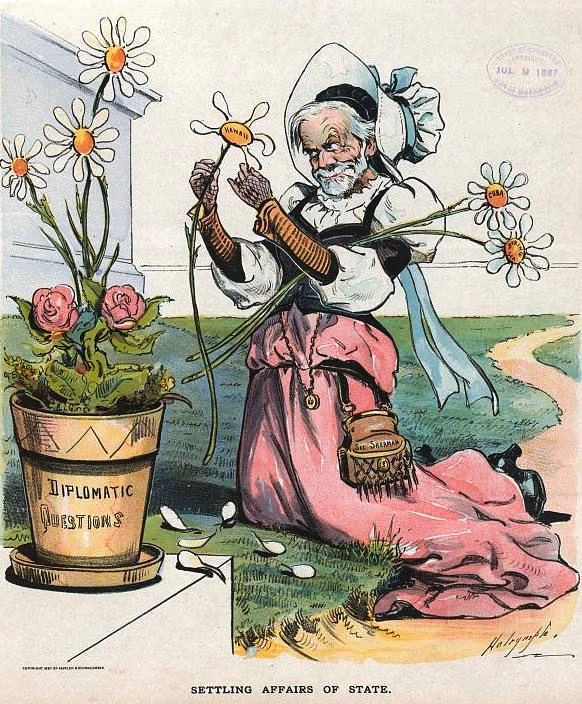
An 1897 political cartoon by Louis Dalrymple depicts Sherman as a young woman attempting to answer major U.S. diplomatic questions by playing the game He loves me ... he loves me not.

In January 1897, McKinley offered Sherman the Secretary of State position, which Sherman, facing a difficult re-election campaign in 1898, quickly accepted. His appointment was swiftly confirmed when Congress convened that March. The appointment was seen as a good one, but many in Washington soon began to question whether Sherman, at age 73, still had the strength and intellectual vigor to handle the job; rumors circulated to that effect, but McKinley did not believe them. Asked for advice on the inaugural address, Sherman offered a draft threatening intervention in Cuba, then in rebellion against Spain; the suggestion was ignored.

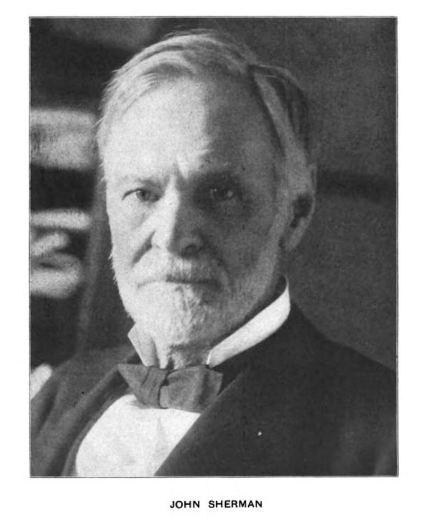
Sherman as Secretary of State

Both Sherman and McKinley sought a peaceful resolution to the Cuban War, preferably involving an independent Cuba without American intervention. The United States and Spain began negotiations on the subject in 1897, but it became clear that Spain would never concede Cuban independence, while the rebels (and their American supporters) would never settle for anything less. In January 1898, Spain promised some concessions to the rebels, but when American consul Fitzhugh Lee reported riots in Havana, McKinley agreed to send the battleship USS Maine there to protect American lives and property. On February 15, the Maine exploded and sank with 266 men killed.

War fever ran high, and by April, McKinley reported to Congress that efforts at diplomatic resolution had failed; a week later, Congress declared war. By this time, McKinley had begun to rely on Assistant Secretary of State William R. Day for day-to-day management of the State Department, and was even inviting him to cabinet meetings, as Sherman had stopped attending them. Day, a McKinley associate of long standing, superseded his boss as the real power in the State Department. Sherman, sensing that he was being made a mere figurehead and recognizing, at last, his declining health and worsening memory, resigned his office on April 25, 1898.

== Retirement, death, and legacy ==
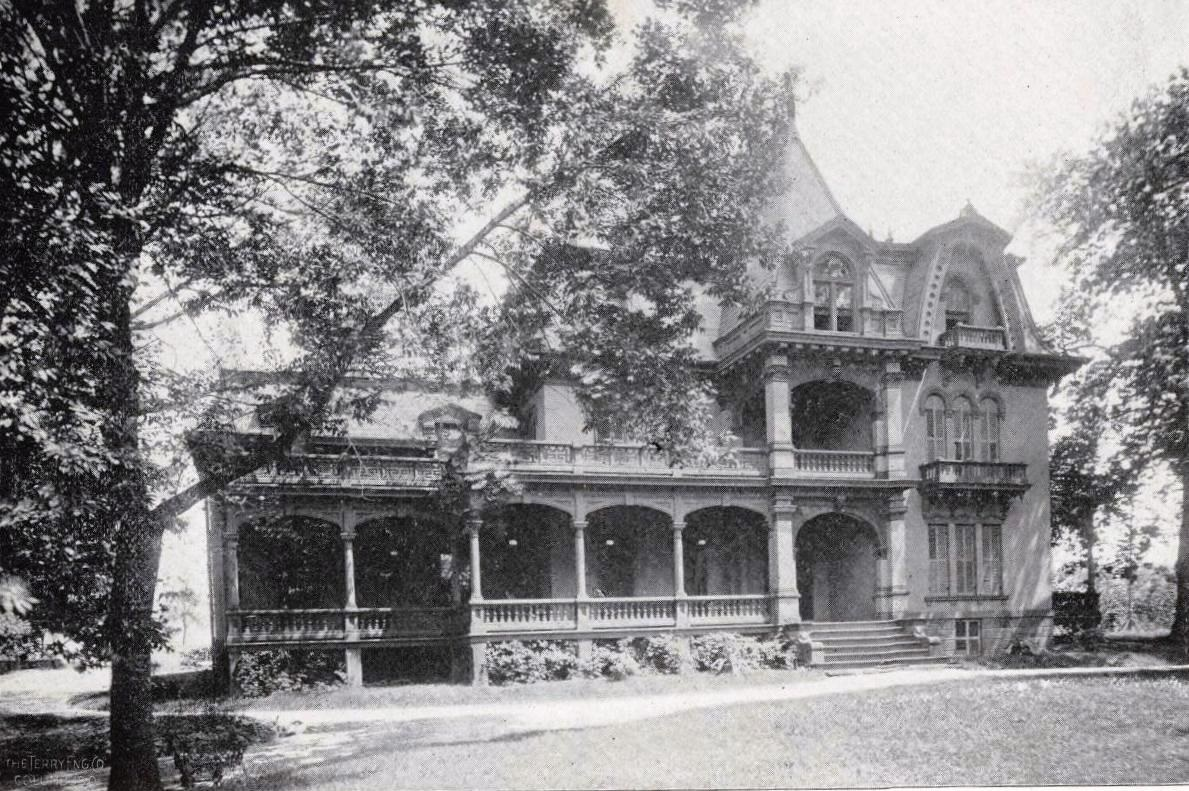
Sherman's home in Mansfield, Ohio

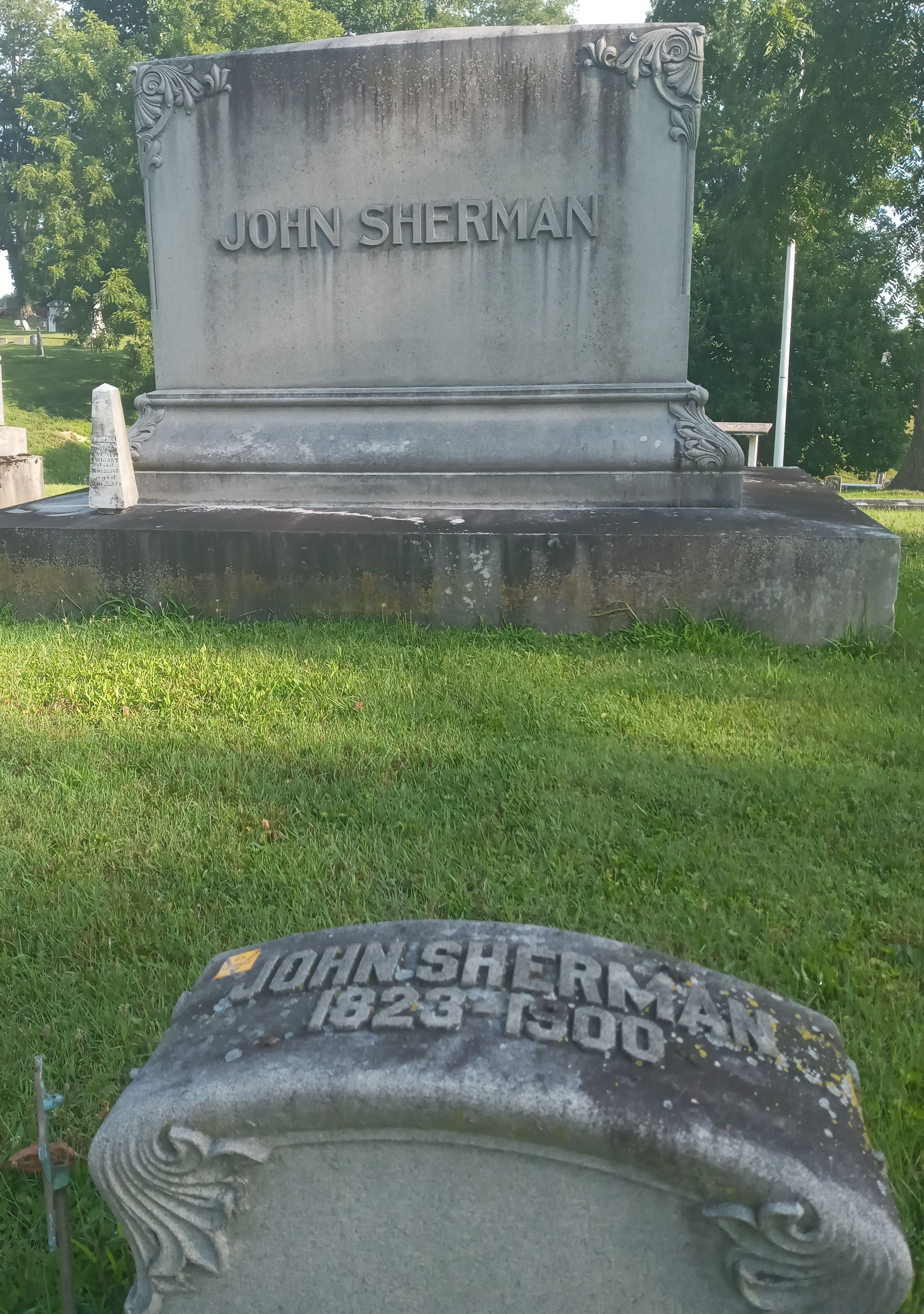
The gravesite of John Sherman

Sherman retired from public life after resigning as Secretary of State. Except for one day, (Note: March 3, 1881, after his resignation as Treasury Secretary but before his swearing-in as senator.) Sherman had spent the previous forty-two years, four months, and twenty-two days in government service. He gave a few interviews in which he disagreed with the administration's policy of annexing Puerto Rico and the Philippines. Later that year, his wife, Margaret, had a stroke; she died two years later on June 5, 1900. Sherman continued to alternate between houses in Mansfield and Washington. He mostly remained out of politics, except for a letter he wrote endorsing George K. Nash for Governor of Ohio in 1899. Sherman died at his Washington home on October 22, 1900, in the company of his daughter, relatives and friends. After a large funeral at St. John's Episcopal Church attended by many prominent national politicians in Washington, he was interred in Mansfield City Cemetery with his wife. President McKinley ordered that all flags be lowered to half-mast for ten days.

Sherman was not unmindful of his legacy and left $10,000 in his will for a biography to be written "by some competent person". Two biographies were published shortly after that, but neither mentions the bequest. In 1906, Congressman Theodore E. Burton of Ohio published a biography; two years later, former representative Winfield S. Kerr of Mansfield published another. Both were very favorable to Sherman. A scholarly biography was said to be in preparation in Allan Nevins's "American Political Leaders" series of the 1920s and 1930s, to be written by Roy Franklin Nichols and his wife, Jeanette Paddock Nichols, but the work was never completed. Jeanette Nichols later published several articles on Sherman in the next few decades, but he still awaits a full-length scholarly biography. He is most remembered now for the antitrust act that bears his name. Burton, in summing up his subject, wrote:

It is true that there was much that was prosaic in the life of Sherman, and that his best efforts were not connected with that glamour which gains the loudest applause; but in substantial influence upon those characteristic features which have made this country what it is, and in the unrecognized but permanent results of efficient and patriotic service for its best interests, there are few for whom a more beneficial record can be claimed.

== Social organizations ==
Sherman was a charter member of the District of Columbia Society of the Sons of the American Revolution. He served as one of the Society's vice presidents from 1891 to 1893.

== Sources ==
Books

- Burton, Theodore E. (1906). John Sherman. American Statesmen. Boston, Massachusetts: Houghton Mifflin Company. OCLC 2693291.
- Davison, Kenneth E. (1972). The Presidency of Rutherford B. Hayes. Westport, Connecticut: Greenwood Press. ISBN 978-0-8371-6275-1.
- Doenecke, Justus D. (1981). The Presidencies of James A. Garfield and Chester A. Arthur. American Presidency. Lawrence: University Press of Kansas. ISBN 978-0-7006-0208-7.
- Foner, Eric (2002) [1988]. Reconstruction: America's Unfinished Revolution, 1863–1877. New York: Harper Perennial Modern Classics. ISBN 978-0-06-093716-4.
- Freehling, William W. (1990). The Road to Disunion: Volume 1 Sessionists at Bay 1776–1854. New York: Oxford University Press. ISBN 0-19-505814-3.
- Freehling, William W. (2007). The Road to Disunion: Volume 2 Secessionists Triumphant 1854–1861. New York: Oxford University Press. ISBN 978-0-19-505815-4.
- Gienapp, William E. (1987). The Origins of the Republican Party, 1852–1856. New York: Oxford University Press. ISBN 0-19-505501-2.
- Gould, Lewis L. (1980). The Presidency of William McKinley. American Presidency. Lawrence: University Press of Kansas. ISBN 978-0-7006-0206-3.
- Hoogenboom, Ari (1995). Rutherford Hayes: Warrior and President. Lawrence: University Press of Kansas. ISBN 978-0-7006-0641-2.
- Kerr, Winfield S. (1908). John Sherman: His Life and Public Services. Vol. 2. Boston, Massachusetts: Sherman, French & Company. OCLC 823261.
- Muzzey, David Saville (1934). James G. Blaine: A Political Idol of Other Days. New York: Dodd, Mead, and Company. OCLC 656771.
- Nevins, Allan (1932). Grover Cleveland: A Study in Courage. New York: Dodd, Mead, and Company. OCLC 1373564.
- Reeves, Thomas C. (1975). Gentleman Boss: The Life of Chester A. Arthur. New York: Alfred A. Knopf. ISBN 978-0-394-46095-6.
- Sherman, John (1895). Recollections of Forty years in the House, Senate and Cabinet. Chicago: The Werner Company. OCLC 5438111.
- Sherman, William T. (1990) [1875]. Memoirs of General W. T. Sherman. New York: Literary Classics of the United States. ISBN 0-940450-65-8.
- Socolofsky, Homer E.; Spetter, Allan B. (1987). The Presidency of Benjamin Harrison. American Presidency. Lawrence: University Press of Kansas. ISBN 978-0-7006-0320-6.
- Trefousse, Hans L. (2002). Rutherford B. Hayes. New York: Times Books. ISBN 978-0-8050-6907-5.
- Unger, Irwin (1964). The Greenback Era: A Social and Political History of American Finance, 1865–1879. Princeton, New Jersey: Princeton University Press. ISBN 0-691-04517-8.
- Welch, Richard E. Jr. (1988). The Presidencies of Grover Cleveland. American Presidency. Lawrence: University Press of Kansas. ISBN 0-7006-0355-7.

Articles

- Bork, Robert H. (October 1966). "Legislative Intent and the Policy of the Sherman Act". Journal of Law and Economics. 9: 7–48. doi:10.1086/466617. JSTOR 724991. S2CID 154406679.
- Bryant, A. Christopher (2003). "Stopping Time: The Pro-Slavery and 'Irrevocable' Thirteenth Amendment". Harvard Journal of Law and Public Policy. 26: 501–549.
- Crenshaw, Ollinger (December 1942). "The Speakership Contest of 1859–1860: John Sherman's Election a Cause of Disruption?". The Mississippi Valley Historical Review. 29 (3): 323–338. doi:10.2307/1897913. JSTOR 1897913.
- Dam, Kenneth W. (1981). "The Legal Tender Cases". The Supreme Court Review. 1981: 367–412. doi:10.1086/scr.1981.3109549. JSTOR 3109549. S2CID 141872405.
- Friedman, Milton (December 1990). "The Crime of 1873". Journal of Political Economy. 98 (6): 1159–1194. doi:10.1086/261730. JSTOR 2937754. S2CID 153940661.
- Harrington, Fred Harvey (December 1936). "Nathaniel Prentiss Banks: A Study in Anti-Slavery Politics". The New England Quarterly. 9 (4): 626–654. doi:10.2307/360988. JSTOR 360988.
- Letwin, William L. (Winter 1956). "Congress and the Sherman Antitrust Law: 1887–1890". The University of Chicago Law Review. 23 (2): 221–258. doi:10.2307/1598473. JSTOR 1598473.
- Million, John Wilson (March 1894). "The Debate on the National Bank Act of 1863". Journal of Political Economy. 2 (2): 251–280. doi:10.1086/250204. JSTOR 1819470.
- Nash, Gerald D. (July 1957). "Origins of the Interstate Commerce Act of 1887". Pennsylvania History. 24 (3): 181–190. JSTOR 27769741.
- Nichols, Jeanette Paddock (September 1934). "John Sherman: A Study in Inflation". The Mississippi Valley Historical Review. 21 (2): 181–194. doi:10.2307/1896890. JSTOR 1896890.
- Nichols, Jeanette Paddock (1968). "Rutherford B. Hayes and John Sherman". Ohio History. 77: 125–38. Archived from the original on July 1, 2007.
- Sibley, Joel H. (Summer 1989). "After 'The First Northern Victory': The Republican Party Comes to Congress, 1855–1856". The Journal of Interdisciplinary History. 20 (1): 1–24. doi:10.2307/204047. JSTOR 204047.
- Smith, Gregor W.; Smith, R. Todd (September 1997). "Greenback-Gold Returns and Expectations of Resumption, 1862–1879" (PDF). The Journal of Economic History. 57 (3): 697–717. doi:10.1017/S0022050700019100. JSTOR 2951196. S2CID 154574399.
- Weinstein, Allen (September 1967). "Was There a 'Crime of 1873'?: The Case of the Demonetized Dollar". The Journal of American History. 54 (2): 307–326. doi:10.2307/1894808. JSTOR 1894808.

Newspaper

- "John Sherman's Estate" (PDF). The New York Times. October 27, 1900.

U.S. House of Representatives
| Preceded by William D. Lindsley | Member of the U.S. House of Representatives from Ohio's 13th congressional district 1855–1861 | Succeeded by Samuel T. Worcester |
| Preceded by John S. Phelps | Chair of the House Ways and Means Committee; 1860–1861 | Succeeded by Thaddeus Stevens |
U.S. Senate
| Preceded by Salmon P. Chase | U.S. senator (Class 3) from Ohio; 1861–1877; Served alongside: Benjamin Wade, Allen G. Thurman | Succeeded by Stanley Matthews |
| Preceded by Philip Allen | Chair of the Senate Agriculture Committee; 1863–1867 | Succeeded by Simon Cameron |
| Preceded by William Pitt Fessenden | Chair of the Senate Finance Committee; 1864–1865 | Succeeded by William Pitt Fessenden |
| Preceded by William Pitt Fessenden | Chair of the Senate Finance Committee; 1867–1877 | Succeeded by Justin Morrill |
| Preceded by Allen G. Thurman | U.S. senator (Class 1) from Ohio; 1881–1897; Served alongside: George H. Pendleton, Henry B. Payne, Calvin S. Brice, Joseph B. Foraker | Succeeded by Mark Hanna |
| Preceded by John F. Miller | Chair of the Senate Foreign Relations Committee; 1886–1893 | Succeeded by John T. Morgan |
| Preceded by John T. Morgan | Chair of the Senate Foreign Relations Committee; 1895–1897 | Succeeded by William P. Frye |
Party political offices
| Preceded by Henry B. Anthony | Chair of the Senate Republican Conference; 1884–1885 | Succeeded by George F. Edmunds |
| Preceded by George F. Edmunds | Chair of the Senate Republican Conference; 1891–1897 | Succeeded by William B. Allison |
Political offices
| Preceded by Lot M. Morrill | United States Secretary of the Treasury; 1877–1881 | Succeeded by William Windom |
| Preceded by George F. Edmunds | President pro tempore of the United States Senate; 1885–1887 | Succeeded by John James Ingalls |
| Preceded by Richard Olney | United States Secretary of State; 1897–1898 | Succeeded by William R. Day |
