= History of the United States government =

The United States achieved independent governance with the Lee Resolution and the Declaration of Independence in July 1776. Following the American Revolutionary War, the Articles of Confederation were adopted in 1781 to establish the federal government. These were succeeded by the Constitution of the United States in 1789, which is the current governing document of the United States. Many of the institutions and customs of the government were established by the Washington administration in the 1790s.

Other foundational elements of the government include the United States Code, the office of the presidency, the executive departments and agencies, Congress, the Supreme Court, and the lower federal courts.

The first era of major change to the government was the Jacksonian Era in the 1830s, which saw changes to the structure of the executive branch and the abolition of the national bank. The nullification crisis in response to high tariffs was the first serious threat to the unity of the United States, with South Carolina threatening secession, but the crisis was averted. Threats of secession reemerged in response to the issue of slavery in the 1860s, resulting in the secession of 11 states to form a rival government, the Confederate States of America. The states were preventing from seceding by the American Civil War and placed under military control before eventually being readmitted.

The Progressive Era brought a new wave of reforms, including the direct election of senators and stronger government regulation of business. These reforms were expanded even further by the New Deal policies implemented in response to the Great Depression, which created programs such as Social Security. Following World War II, American foreign policy was dominated by the Cold War while American domestic policy was influenced by economic development and the civil rights movement. In the 21st century, the September 11 attacks caused major shifts in government structure and foreign policy.

== Overview and summary data ==
=== Current departments ===
Since the founding of the United States and in the centuries since then, numerous cabinet departments and agencies have been established as the need arose. The table below provides summary historical data for current Cabinet departments.

Department	Seal	Flag	Formed	Employees	Total budget	Head	
Department	Seal	Flag	Formed	Employees	Total budget	Title	Titleholder
State			July 27, 1789	30,000 (2023)	$58.1 billion (2023)	Secretary of State	Marco Rubio
Treasury			September 2, 1789	100,000 (2023)	$16.4 billion (2023)	Secretary of the Treasury	Vacant
Interior			March 3, 1849	70,000 (2023)	$35 billion (2023)	Secretary of the Interior	Vacant
Agriculture			May 15, 1862	100,000 (2023)	$242 billion (2023)	Secretary of Agriculture	Vacant
Justice			July 1, 1870	113,543 (2012)	$37.5 billion (2023)	Attorney General	Vacant
Commerce			February 14, 1903	41,000 (2023)	$16.3 billion (2023)	Secretary of Commerce	Vacant
Labor			March 4, 1913	15,000 (2023)	$97.5 billion (2023)	Secretary of Labor	Vacant
Defense			September 18, 1947	3,200,000 (2023)	$852 billion (2023)	Secretary of Defense	Pete Hegseth
Housing and Urban Development			September 9, 1965	9,000 (2023)	$61.7 billion (2023)	Secretary of Housing and Urban Development	Vacant
Transportation			April 1, 1967	55,000 (2023)	$145 billion (2023)	Secretary of Transportation	Vacant
Energy			August 4, 1977	10,000 (2023)	$45.8 billion (2023)	Secretary of Energy	Vacant
Health and Human Services			October 17, 1979	65,000 (2023)	$1.772 trillion (2023)	Secretary of Health and Human Services	Vacant
Education			October 17, 1979	4,200 (2023)	$79.6 billion (2023)	Secretary of Education	Vacant
Veterans Affairs			March 15, 1989	235,000 (2023)	$308.5 billion (2023)	Secretary of Veterans Affairs	Vacant
Homeland Security			November 25, 2002	250,000 (2023)	$101.6 billion (2023)	Secretary of Homeland Security	Kristi Noem

=== Former departments ===
Department	Formed	Removed from Cabinet	Superseded by	Last Cabinet-level head	
Department	Formed	Removed from Cabinet	Superseded by	Title	Titleholder
War	August 7, 1789	September 18, 1947	Department of the Army; Department of the Air Force	Secretary of War	Kenneth Claiborne Royall
Navy	April 30, 1798	August 10, 1949	Department of Defense (as executive department) became and still are military departments within the Department of Defense	Secretary of the Navy	Francis P. Matthews
Army	September 18, 1947	August 10, 1949	Department of Defense (as executive department) became and still are military departments within the Department of Defense	Secretary of the Army	Gordon Gray
Air Force	September 18, 1947	August 10, 1949	Department of Defense (as executive department) became and still are military departments within the Department of Defense	Secretary of the Air Force	Stuart Symington
Post Office	February 20, 1792	July 1, 1971	United States Postal Service	Postmaster General	Winton M. Blount
Commerce and Labor	February 14, 1903	March 4, 1913	Department of Commerce; Department of Labor (The Department of Commerce is considered a continuation of the Department of Commerce and Labor under a new name.)	Secretary of Commerce and Labor	Charles Nagel
Health, Education, and Welfare	April 11, 1953	October 17, 1979	Department of Education; Department of Health and Human Services (The Department of Health and Human Services is considered a continuation of the Department of Health, Education, and Welfare under a new name.)	Secretary of Health, Education, and Welfare	Patricia Roberts Harris

== Articles of Confederation (1776-1789) ==
The Second Continental Congress became the first independent federal government of the United States when it declared independence from the Kingdom of Great Britain on July 4, 1776. It served as a provisional government and oversaw the drafting of the Articles of Confederation. The Continental Congress transitioned into the Congress of the Confederation when it adopted the Articles of Confederation on March 1, 1781, after they were ratified by all 13 states.

Under the Articles of Confederation, the Congress served as the sole body of the legislature. Each state was to send a delegation of two to seven members as appointed by state legislatures, and each delegation was entitled to a single vote in legislative procedures. The federal government held jurisdiction over treaties, alliances, and declarations of war. Approval of these actions required at least nine states to vote in the affirmative. The states were forbidden from raising an army during peacetime, but all states were required to maintain a militia.

The Articles of Confederation tasked the states with raising funds and military strength when requested by the Congress. However, the Articles included no mechanism to compel to states to provide for the federal government, and compliance was voluntary. Modifications to the Articles required the assent of all 13 state delegations, and the Congress rarely had a quorum as there was no mechanism to maintain attendance of delegates. The Congress elected a presiding officer, often referred to as the president. However, this position was merely administrative and had no executive power.

In the 1770s, executive power under the Articles of Confederation was primarily delegated to boards created by Congress. These included the Board of War, the Financial Administration, the Treasury Office of Accounts, and the Navy Board. The Financial Administration was later replaced by a Board of Treasury. Congress also utilized many committees for specific purposes, including foreign affairs and commerce. In 1780, Congress replaced the board system with fixed executive offices, including the Secretary of Foreign Affairs, the Superintendent of Finance, and the Secretary at War. A Secretary of Marine was also created, but its responsibilities were merged with the Superintendent of Finance before the office was ever filled.

== Federalist Era (1789-1801) ==
=== Adoption of the Constitution (1789) ===
State delegations met for the Constitutional Convention in 1787. While the convention was initially held to modify the existing Articles of Confederation, the eventual consensus was the drafting of a new constitution. The Constitution of the United States was drafted and ratified, and it came into force on March 4, 1789. The Constitution established a presidential system with separation of powers and three branches of government that are still in use today.

Legislative power was vested in the United States Congress, a bicameral legislature consisting of an upper chamber representing each state, the United States Senate, and a lower chamber representing equally divided districts within the states, the United States House of Representatives. At the time, members of the House were directly elected while members of the Senate were chosen by state legislatures. Several powers were delegated to Congress, with a simple majority from both chambers required to pass legislation.

Executive power was vested in the president of the United States and the federal officers that answer to the president. The president was delegated powers to enforce the law, engage in foreign affairs, and oversee the operations of the federal government. The president was also given veto power over Congressional legislation that requires a two-thirds majority from both chambers to overrule. Judicial power was vested in the Supreme Court of the United States, composed of judges nominated by the president and confirmed by the Senate. Congress was also given the power to establish lower courts.

==== Passage of the Bill of Rights, 1789-1791 ====
The Bill of Rights comprises the first ten amendments to the United States Constitution. Proposed following the often bitter 1787–88 debate over the ratification of the Constitution and written to address the objections raised by Anti-Federalists, the Bill of Rights amendments add to the Constitution specific guarantees of personal freedoms and rights, clear limitations on the government's power in judicial and other proceedings, and explicit declarations that all powers not specifically granted to the federal government by the Constitution are reserved to the states or the people. The concepts codified in these amendments are built upon those in earlier documents, especially the Virginia Declaration of Rights (1776), as well as the Northwest Ordinance (1787), the English Bill of Rights (1689), and Magna Carta (1215).

Largely because of the efforts of Representative James Madison, who studied the deficiencies of the Constitution pointed out by anti-federalists and then crafted a series of corrective proposals, Congress approved twelve articles of amendment on September 25, 1789, and submitted them to the states for ratification. Contrary to Madison's proposal that the proposed amendments be incorporated into the main body of the Constitution (at the relevant articles and sections of the document), they were proposed as supplemental additions (codicils) to it. Articles Three through Twelve were ratified as additions to the Constitution on December 15, 1791, and became Amendments One through Ten of the Constitution.

=== Presidency of George Washington (1789-1797) ===
The first actions of the new government did not immediately take place following the Constitution's adoption, as not enough members of Congress had arrived to form a quorum. The electoral votes for president and vice president were counted on April 6, 1789, and George Washington was inaugurated the first president on April 30. The Washington administration marked the beginning of the First Party System with the development of the Federalist Party and the Democratic-Republican Party. Several disputes over the Constitution persisted following its ratification, and ten amendments were made in 1791, which became the Bill of Rights. The Bill of Rights established several rights that the federal government cannot infringe, including rights to freedom of speech and expression, the right to keep and bear arms, rights of due process, and states' rights.

The three executive departments that existed under the Articles of Confederation were reestablished during Washington's presidency as the Department of State, the Department of War, and the Department of the Treasury. The office of Attorney General was created by the Judiciary Act of 1789 to serve as Washington's legal counsel. In 1791, Washington began holding joint meetings with the Secretary of State, the Secretary of War, the Secretary of the Treasury, and the Attorney General, who together became known as the presidential cabinet.

The Department of State's responsibilities were divided between foreign affairs, such as consuls to other nations, and domestic affairs, such as legislative records and the Great Seal. These were initially divided between the Home Office and the Foreign Office, but the two offices were consolidated in 1790.

The Continental Army, Continental Navy, and Continental Marines were disestablished at the end of the Revolutionary War and replaced by the First American Regiment as a minimal peacetime army. The Continental Army was reconstituted as the Legion of the United States in 1792 in response to the American Indian Wars, which in turn became the United States Army in 1796. Construction of a Naval fleet was authorized by the Naval Act of 1794, and construction began on six frigates. The president was given authority over state militias under certain circumstances by the Militia Acts of 1792 and 1795. During Washington's presidency, the Department of War developed to include several new administrative offices.

The Department of the Treasury was established with the offices of Comptroller, Auditor, Treasurer, Register, and assistant to the Secretary. The department adopted the policy of debt assumption and began issuing treasury securities, while tariffs were levied to fund government activity. Excises were also applied, but there were much more controversial, causing the first major insurrection in the Whiskey Rebellion. The Revenue-Marine was established within the Department of the Treasury in 1790 to serve as an armed customs enforcement service, and the Post Office was established in the department under the Postal Clause of the Constitution. The First Bank of the United States, the country's first central bank, was established in 1791, and the Philadelphia Mint, the first United States Mint, was established in 1792.

The federal judiciary, the office of the Attorney General, district attorneys, and marshals were established by the Judiciary Act of 1789. Washington nominated John Jay to be the first Chief Justice of the Supreme Court, and he was sworn in on October 19, 1789. The original Supreme Court consisted of six justices in total. The Supreme Court made its first landmark case in 1793 with Chisholm v. Georgia, ruling that states did not have sovereign immunity from citizens in other states. This resulted in the ratification of the Eleventh Amendment in 1794, granting sovereign immunity in federal courts to the states.

The number of members of the House of Representatives was capped at 105 by the Apportionment Act of 1792, and the Senate began holding sessions open to the public in 1794. The first federal criminal code was established by the Crimes Act of 1790, and the site of Washington, D.C. was chosen to be the location for the nation's capital in 1790 by the Residence Act. The United States established early foreign relations during this period, with Jay Treaty, Pinckney's Treaty, the Treaty of Tripoli, and the Treaty of Greenville, codifying relations with Great Britain, Spain, Tripoli, and the peoples of the Northwest Territory, respectively. Vermont, Kentucky, and Tennessee were all admitted as states during Washington's presidency.

==== Role of US Marshals ====
Federal marshals were by far the most important government officials in territorial jurisdictions. The marshals thus provided local representation for the federal government within their districts. They took the national census every decade through 1870. They distributed presidential proclamations, collected a variety of statistical information on commerce and manufacturing, supplied the names of government employees for the national register, and performed other routine tasks needed for the central government to function effectively.

The office of United States Marshal was created by the First Congress. President Washington signed the Judiciary Act into law on September 24, 1789. The Act provided that a United States Marshal's primary function was to execute all lawful warrants issued to him under the authority of the United States. The law defined marshals as officers of the courts charged with assisting federal courts in their law-enforcement functions. Six days after signing the act into law, President Washington appointed the first thirteen U.S. Marshals, for each of the then extant federal districts.

From the nation's earliest days, marshals were permitted to recruit special deputies as local hires, or as temporary transfers to the Marshals Service from other federal law-enforcement agencies. Marshals were also authorized to swear in a posse to assist with manhunts, and other duties, ad hoc. Marshals were given extensive authority to support the federal courts within their judicial districts, and to carry out all lawful orders issued by federal judges, Congress, or the president.

Federal marshals are most famous for their law enforcement work, but that was only a minor part of their workload. The largest part of the business was paper work—serving writs (e.g., subpoenas, summonses, warrants), and other processes issued by the courts, making arrests and handling all federal prisoners. They also disbursed funds as ordered by the courts. Marshals paid the fees and expenses of the court clerks, U.S. Attorneys, jurors, and witnesses. They rented the courtrooms and jail space, and hired the bailiffs, criers, and janitors. They made sure the prisoners were present, the jurors were available, and that the witnesses were on time.

=== Presidency of John Adams (1797-1801) ===
Upon taking the office of president, John Adams chose to retain Washington's executive cabinet. The Department of the Navy was established in 1798, and the Secretary of the Navy was added to the cabinet. The United States Marine Corps was established within the Department of the Navy in 1798. The federal government officially moved to Washington, D.C. in 1800, during which time the Library of Congress was established as the national library.

Foreign policy of the United States was shaped by the XYZ Affair in 1798 and the resulting Quasi-War with the French First Republic. The Logan Act was passed in 1799 to prevent unauthorized negotiations with foreign governments. The Marine Hospital Service was established within the Revenue-Marine in 1798. The Department of War underwent several reforms in anticipation of war with France, including the establishment of an Apothecary General and other medical officers in 1799. The Provisional Army of the United States was also briefly maintained at this time, but it was dissolved in 1800.

In 1798, the controversial Alien and Sedition Acts were passed to mitigate what the Federalists saw as a rising threat of rebellion from the Democratic-Republicans amid the Quasi-War. These laws made it more difficult to immigrate to the United States, gave the president authority to order imprisonment or deportation of non-citizens, and made it a crime to criticize the government or the president in a way that was deemed to be false. These laws were widely criticized, and they were repealed or allowed to expire at the end of Adams' term. Only the "Alien Enemy Act" is still in effect today.

== Jeffersonian Era and Era of Good Feelings (1801-1825) ==
=== Presidency of Thomas Jefferson (1801-1809) ===
The influence of the Federalist Party was greatly diminished after the 1800 United States elections, and the federal government came to be controlled by the Democratic-Republican Party. Thomas Jefferson replaced Federalist department heads with members of his own party, but he resisted calls from his party to establish a spoils system and fill all appointments with political allies. Jefferson advocated strong republicanism and egalitarianism in government with emphasis on agrarianism. Jefferson's political ideology became known as Jeffersonian democracy, and these ideas dominated the federal government for decades.

Following the competitive presidential elections of 1796 and 1800, it became apparent that the Constitution's mechanism for presidential elections was insufficient. Under the previous system, every elector cast two votes, and the individual with the second most votes became the vice president. The Twelfth Amendment was ratified in 1804 to modify the presidential election process so that the elections of president and vice president are held separately.

Developments in the judicial branch resulted from attempts by the Democratic-Republicans to limit the influence of Federalist judges that had been appointed by President Adams. The Judiciary Act of 1802 established a system of six circuit courts, with one corresponding to each Supreme Court justice. This was superseded by the Seventh Circuit Act of 1807, which created a seventh circuit court and added a seventh justice to the Supreme Court. The Supreme Court's power in government affairs increased significantly in 1803 after it asserted the power of judicial review by American courts in Marbury v. Madison. The Supreme Court also issued multiple rulings describing the nature of federal power during Jefferson's presidency. It ruled that the president can not ignore laws passed by Congress in Little v. Barreme in 1804, and it ruled that federal courts supersede the decisions of state governments in United States v. Peters in 1809.

Foreign policy was dominated by the Napoleonic Wars in Europe. The United States sought a neutral stance between France and the United Kingdom. Increasing hostilities by the United Kingdom, such as the Chesapeake–Leopard affair, resulting in a federal policy of banning exports with the Embargo Act of 1807. The ban was reduced to just France and the United Kingdom in 1809 with the Non-Intercourse Act. The United States also engaged in the First Barbary War during Jefferson's presidency.

The Democratic-Republicans were skeptical of standing armies and sought to reduce the country's military. Three major laws affecting American military policy were passed by the Jefferson administration. The Military Peace Establishment Act codified the structure of the military as well as establishing the United States Military Academy and the Army Corps of Engineers, the Insurrection Act of 1807 authorized the president to use military force to suppress insurrection in the United States, and the Militia Act of 1808 provided federal funding for state militias to serve as an alternative to a federal standing army. The Office of Indian Trade was established within the Department of War in 1806 to regulate trade with Native American tribes.

In 1803, the Senate ratified the Louisiana Purchase, doubling the size of the United States, and Jefferson authorized the Lewis and Clark Expedition to explore the new land. Ohio was admitted as a state the same year. In 1804, Samuel Chase became the first and only Supreme Court justice to be impeached. The government's first scientific agency, the Survey of the Coast, was established in 1807 as part of the Department of the Treasury.

==== Embargo Act ====
Foreign policy was dominated by the Napoleonic Wars in Europe. The United States sought a neutral stance between France and the United Kingdom. Increasing hostilities by the United Kingdom, such as the Chesapeake–Leopard affair, resulting in a federal policy of banning exports with the Embargo Act of 1807. The ban was reduced to just France and the United Kingdom in 1809 with the Non-Intercourse Act. The United States also engaged in the First Barbary War during Jefferson's presidency.

The Embargo Act of 1807 was a general trade embargo on all foreign nations that was enacted by the United States Congress. As a successor or replacement law for the 1806 Non-importation Act and passed as the Napoleonic Wars continued, it represented an escalation of attempts to coerce Britain to stop any impressment of American sailors and to respect American sovereignty and neutrality but also attempted to pressure France and other nations in the pursuit of general diplomatic and economic leverage.

In the first decade of the 19th century, American shipping grew. During the Napoleonic Wars, rival nations Britain and France targeted neutral American shipping as a means to disrupt the trade of the other nation. American merchantmen who were trading with "enemy nations" were seized as contraband of war by European navies. The British Royal Navy had impressed American sailors who had either been British-born or previously serving on British ships, even if they now claimed to be American citizens with American papers. Incidents such as the Chesapeake–Leopard affair outraged Americans.

Congress imposed the embargo in direct response to these events. President Thomas Jefferson acted with restraint, weighed public support for retaliation, and recognized that the United States was militarily far weaker than either Britain or France. He recommended that Congress respond with commercial warfare, a policy that appealed to Jefferson both for being experimental and for foreseeably harming his domestic political opponents more than his allies, whatever its effect on the European belligerents. The 10th Congress was controlled by his allies and agreed to the Act, which was signed into law on December 22, 1807.

The embargo proved to be a complete failure. It failed to improve the American diplomatic position, highlighted American weakness and lack of leverage, significantly (and only) damaged the American economy, and sharply increased domestic political tensions. Both widespread evasion of the embargo and loopholes in the legislation reduced its impact on its targets. British commercial shipping, which already dominated global trade, was successfully adapting to Napoleon's Continental System by pursuing new markets, particularly in the restive Spanish and Portuguese colonies in South America. Thus, British merchants were well-positioned to grow at American expense when the embargo sharply reduced American trade activity.

The embargo undermined American unity by provoking bitter protests, particularly in New England commercial centers. Support for the declining Federalist Party, which intensely opposed Jefferson, temporarily rebounded and drove electoral gains in 1808 (Senate and House). The embargo simultaneously undermined Americans' faith that their government could execute laws fairly and strengthened the European perception that the republican form of government was inept and ineffectual.

Replacement legislation for the ineffective embargo was enacted on March 1, 1809, in the last days of Jefferson's presidency. Tensions with Britain continued to grow and eventually led to the War of 1812.

Most historians consider Jefferson's embargo to have been ineffective and harmful to American interests. Even the top officials of the Jefferson administration viewed the embargo as a flawed policy, but they saw it as preferable to war. Appleby describes the strategy as Jefferson's "least effective policy", and Joseph Ellis calls it "an unadulterated calamity". Others, however, portray it as an innovative, nonviolent measure which aided France in its war with Britain while preserving American neutrality. Jefferson believed that the failure of the embargo was due to selfish traders and merchants showing a lack of "republican virtue." He maintained that, had the embargo been widely observed, it would have avoided war in 1812.

=== Presidency of James Madison (1809-1817) ===
James Madison was an ally of President Jefferson and retained much of his predecessor's policy. However, the United States ended its policy of neutrality between France and the United Kingdom when it declared war against the United Kingdom, beginning the War of 1812. The United States government was briefly dislocated from Washington D.C. during the war when the capital was captured and burned by British forces in 1814.

The American military was insufficient and unprepared for a major war. Secretary of War William Eustis pushed for reforms to military tactics and readiness, but Eustis was considered to be unqualified and his attempts to lead the Department of War were unsuccessful, leading to his resignation several months into the war. Eustis' successor John Armstrong Jr. was similarly forced to resign in disgrace following the Burning of Washington. The Department of War saw major expansion throughout the war as a result, and it underwent several iterations throughout the 1810s. Conversely, the Department of the Navy was regarded as highly successful during the War of 1812. Following the end of the war, the Navy was updated with the establishment of the Board of Navy Commissioners and the construction of ships of the line.

Economic policy of the United States moved toward protectionism with the Tariff of 1816. While tariffs had previously been implemented to raise funds, this tariff was passed to limit imports from other countries, a trend that would continue through the 1820s and 1830s. The First Bank of the United States had its charter expire in 1811, so the Second Bank of the United States was established as the country's national bank in 1816. In the interim period without a national bank, state-charted banks became increasingly common and states began issuing their own banknotes, which had no formal backing. Following the War of 1812, Secretary of the Treasury Alexander J. Dallas was praised for reorganizing his department, emphasizing internal revenue.

The Supreme Court reasserted its authority by claiming jurisdiction over state courts in matters of federal law in Martin v. Hunter's Lessee in 1816. Two additional states were admitted during the presidency of James Madison: Louisiana was admitted in 1812, and Indiana was admitted in 1816.

=== Presidency of James Monroe (1817-1825) ===
During the presidency of James Monroe, political parties briefly became less relevant in federal politics. The Federalist Party ceased to be a major party, and most government officials coalesced under a single party for a period called the Era of Good Feelings. Opposition to the Democratic-Republican Party was so minute that Monroe effectively ran for reelection virtually unopposed. The Monroe administration saw the American economy disrupted by the Panic of 1819, the first financial crisis faced by the United States. In response, the government reformed how it sold lands with the Land Act of 1820 and the Relief Act of 1821.

Monroe and Secretary of State John Quincy Adams codified early American foreign policy in the Monroe Doctrine. Under this policy, the United States would oppose any European interference in the Americas as well as any attempts to establish new colonies in the Western Hemisphere. Monroe also continued the process of restoring relations with the United Kingdom following the War of 1812 and fought the First Seminole War in Florida before buying Florida from Spain. The African Slave Trade Patrol was created in 1819 to assist in the fight against the Atlantic slave trade. Following the disestablishment of the Office of Indian Trade, Secretary of War John C. Calhoun established the Bureau of Indian Affairs without Congressional authorization. Calhoun also established the rank of Commanding General of the United States Army as part of his reforms to improve the Army's efficiency.

The Supreme Court further defined the powers of states versus the federal government in three landmark cases. It ruled that the Necessary and Proper Clause grants implied powers and that the states cannot pass laws that interfere with federal programs in McCulloch v. Maryland, it extended this ruling to criminal charges in Cohens v. Virginia, and it ruled that states cannot regulate interstate commerce due to the Commerce Clause in Gibbons v. Ogden.

Five states were admitted during the presidency of James Monroe: Mississippi in 1817, Illinois in 1818, Alabama in 1819, Maine in 1820, and Missouri in 1821. The admission of Missouri served to exacerbate the issue of slavery in the United States. Sitting between the northern states and the southern states, the status of Missouri as a slave state or a free state was hotly debated in Congress. The Missouri Compromise was eventually reached.

== Jacksonian Era (1825-1849) ==
=== Presidency of John Quincy Adams (1825-1829) ===
The Era of Good Feelings ended following the 1824 United States presidential election, and the Second Party System began with the fracture of the Democratic-Republican Party. Supporters of John Quincy Adams formed the National Republican Party and supporters of Andrew Jackson formed the Democratic Party. Adams maintained the Monroe Doctrine that he had helped develop in the previous administration, and the United States aligned itself with Latin American countries, strengthening ties and negotiating trade agreements.

The Post Office established a dead letter office in 1825 to address dead letter mail. The protectionist Tariff of 1828 was a highly controversial development in American economic policy that placed high duties on several imports, and it was criticized for its disproportionate impact on the economies of southern states.

=== Presidency of Andrew Jackson (1829-1837) ===
The presidency of Andrew Jackson represented a major turning point for American government. Jackson believed in a rotation in office system, in which no one individual was allowed to serve in government for too long. Upon taking the presidency, he replaced a large portion of federal officers, which Jackson's opponents criticized as filling the government with political allies, essentially creating a spoils system. Political opponents of Jackson, including the National Republicans, the Anti-Masonic Party, and anti-Jacksonian Democrats, coalesced to form the Whig Party, which would be a major force in American politics for the next two decades. Federalism was more clearly defined by the Supreme Court with the decision of Barron v. Baltimore in 1833, ruling that the Bill of Rights does not apply to state governments.

The United States government faced a major challenge from the nullification crisis in 1832. The Tariff of 1832 was passed, and while it was a reduction of the controversial Tariff of 1828, its passage still resulted in conflict. The government of South Carolina declared its intention to nullify the tariff, which would result in a constitutional crisis and threaten the union. The federal government prepared for an escalation of the conflict with the Force Bill, but the crisis was averted after a compromise was made in the Tariff of 1833. Following this incident, the United States moved away from protectionism.

Several parts of government saw major reforms during Jackson's presidency. The Post Office was raised to a cabinet level department during Jackson's administration. The Bureau of Pensions was established in 1832. The Survey of the Coast was briefly transferred from the Department of the Treasury to the Department of the Navy in 1834, but it was returned to the Department of the Treasury and renamed the United States Coast Survey in 1836. The judicial branch was expanded with the Eighth and Ninth Circuits Act of 1837, creating two new circuit courts and adding two new justices to the Supreme Court, bringing both to a total of nine.

The Department of State was reformed into a system of bureaus, going through several iterations before a system of four bureaus was established in 1834: the Diplomatic Bureau; the Consular Bureau; the Home Bureau; and the Keeper of the Archives, Translator, and Disbursing Agent. The Commissioner of Patents was established in 1836.

The Jackson administration was hostile to indigenous populations, most notably initiating the forced displacement of approximately 60,000 Native Americans in what became known as the Trail of Tears. Included in this displacement was the Second Seminole War waged between the United States and the Seminole people. The Supreme Court ruled on tribal sovereignty early in Jackson's administration in 1832 in Worcester v. Georgia, but this did little to prevent the removals. Congress also recognized the Bureau of Indian Affairs as an official government bureau in 1832.

Jackson was heavily involved in the monetary policy of the government. He was a strong opponent of national banks, seeing them as inherently corrupt, and in 1832 he vetoed a bill that would renew the bank's charter. This triggered the Bank War, a major political dispute over the future of the national bank in the United States. Jackson transferred the national bank's funds to state banks, and he allowed its charter to expire in 1836. Jackson also influenced monetary policy through his policy of Specie Circular, requiring federal land to be purchased directly with silver and gold rather than banknotes. Jackson's monetary policies are often cited as a major cause of the Panic of 1837.

Two states were admitted during Jackson's presidency: Arkansas in 1836 and Michigan in 1837.

=== Presidency of Martin Van Buren (1837-1841) ===
Martin Van Buren was a strong supporter of President Jackson and saw to the continuation his policies, particularly in regard to economic policy and the forced displacement of Native Americans. The Panic of 1837 began after hard currency reserves were depleted and banks began refusing the redemption of banknotes. The Van Buren administration worked to establish an Independent Treasury to replace state and national banks.

The United States saw diplomatic conflict with the United Kingdom follow border disputes with Colonial Canada, leading to the bloodless Aroostook War in 1838. Tensions also rose with Mexico as the United States maintained relations with and considered annexation of the Republic of Texas, which Mexico claimed as its own territory.

In 1838, the United States Mint opened new branches in Charlotte, North Carolina; Dahlonega, Georgia; and New Orleans, Louisiana in addition to its primary location in Philadelphia. Postmaster General John Milton Niles ended postal service on Sundays, a policy that still exists in the modern Post Office. In 1839, Congress established an agricultural division within the Patent Office.

=== Presidencies of William Henry Harrison and John Tyler (1841-1845) ===
The sudden death of President William Henry Harrison one month into his term resulted in a constitutional crisis. As the first instance of a president dying in office, it was unclear what role Vice President John Tyler was to play. Tyler determined that he was to assume the presidency in full, setting the "Tyler precedent". Though not everyone initially recognized him as president, his actions would set the standard procedure for presidential vacancies. The federal government was in disarray for much of Tyler's presidency due to intraparty fighting, in large part because of Tyler's disagreements with the Whig Party platform and his extensive use of the presidential veto. Tyler's hostility toward Congress resulted in the first impeachment proceedings against a president, but the impeachment ultimately never went past the House.

The United States worked to improve relations with the United Kingdom following several major disputes in the late 1830s. The Webster–Ashburton Treaty resolved the border dispute between Maine and Canada, and Tyler developed a plan to address the Oregon boundary dispute that was adopted shortly after the end of his presidency. The Treaty of Wanghia established ties between the United States and China in 1845. The Independent Treasury System was abolished during Tyler's presidency, and the use of treasury notes increased significantly. The Department of the Navy was greatly expanded under Secretary of the Navy Abel P. Upshur. The United States Naval Observatory was established, steamships were adopted, and the Board of Navy Commissioners was replaced with a bureau system.

Florida was admitted as a state in 1845.

=== Presidency of James K. Polk (1845-1849) ===
The Democratic Party's platform of manifest destiny reached its pinnacle under the direction of James K. Polk, directing westward expansion, justifying the Texas annexation, leading the United States into the Mexican–American War. By the end of Polk's term, the country had claimed most of the present-day Southwestern United States.

The United States Naval Academy opened in Annapolis, Maryland in 1845, the Independent Treasury was reestablished in 1846, and the Smithsonian Institution was established in 1846 as the United States National Museum. The United States Life-Saving Service was established under the Department of the Treasury in 1848. The Department of the Post Office began issuing federally endorsed postage stamps in 1847, requiring payment before shipments rather than after.

Texas was admitted as a state following its annexation in 1845, Iowa was admitted in 1846, and Wisconsin was admitted in 1848.

==== Department of the Interior ====
The Department of the Interior was established in 1849 by consolidating the Department of the Treasury's United States General Land Office, the Department of War's Bureau of Indian Affairs, the Department of State's Patent Office, and military pension offices.

A large number of governmental functions were assigned to the Interior Department, simply because at that time there was a lack of specialized agencies to handle many vital government functions. The Interior Department carried out the US Census, managed hospitals and universities, and also handled a number of other roles and processes that were not necessarily directly related to each other. In the 1880s, the department's role had greatly expanded, and it handled the pensions for military veterans.

The Interior Department was occasionally referred to as "Mother of Departments." When the Department of Agriculture was founded in 1882, it originated from the agricultural division of the Patent Office within the Interior Department. In 1884, The Bureau of Labor was created within Interior, and later became the Department of Labor in 1888. In 1903 various components of Interior Department, including the Census Bureau, were combined with the Labor Department to form the Department of Commerce and Labor, which split into two cabinet departments in 1913. The Interstate Commerce Commission reported to the Secretary of the Interior for the first two years of its life, 1887–89, before becoming an independent agency. In 1930 the Bureau of Pensions went to the new Veterans Administration, which became the Department of Veterans Affairs in 1989. In 1977 several Interior functions helped form another new cabinet agency, the Department of Energy.

== Antebellum and Civil War Era (1849-1865) ==
=== Presidencies of Zachary Taylor and Millard Fillmore (1849-1853) ===
The issues surrounding slavery and the Mexican Cession became the primary concern of the federal government going into the 1850s. Zachary Taylor attempted to avoid the issue during his brief time as president, and his successor Millard Fillmore enforced the terms of the Compromise of 1850. This compromise included provisions that determined the boundaries of western states and territories, the status of slavery in newly claimed land, and the Fugitive Slave Act of 1850 that raised tensions regarding slavery between the north and the south. Settlement of the west also prompted the Donation Land Claim Act and the California Land Act of 1851.

Potential conflict with the United Kingdom was resolved with the Clayton–Bulwer Treaty in 1850, addressing how the two countries were to interact with Central America. Relations between the United States and France were strained following a diplomatic incident involving the French ambassador and President Taylor, and the United States discouraged French annexation of Hawaii under President Fillmore. Tensions briefly rose with Spain when some Americans called for annexation of Spanish-controlled Cuba. Fillmore also organized the Perry Expedition that would lead to open relations with Japan over the following decades.

Coinage was reformed with the Coinage Act of 1853, reducing the amount of silver in American currency. This bill has been identified as a major step toward abandoning bimetallism and adopting the gold standard. The Department of the Interior took shape during the administrations of Taylor and Fillmore, having been created just days prior to Taylor's inauguration. The department was widely criticized as being an opportunity for political patronage.

California was admitted as a state in 1850 as part of the Compromise of 1850.

=== Presidency of Franklin Pierce (1853-1857) ===
The presidency of President Franklin Pierce effectively marked the end of the Second Party System. The Third Party System began to form with the Democratic Party losing influence, the Whig Party disappearing, and the Republican Party becoming a major political force. The Republican Party was established in response to the Kansas–Nebraska Act of 1854, which essentially repealed the Missouri Compromise and triggered violent conflict over the issue of slavery in the Kansas Territory. These issues were further exacerbated by the caning of Charles Sumner in the Senate Chamber.

The executive branch saw reforms under the Pierce administration that established a predecessor to the civil service system that would later be implemented. The Army and the Navy were significantly expanded during the Pierce administration, including the formation of the United States Camel Corps in 1856. The United States ended its recognition of foreign currencies as legal tender with the Coinage Act of 1857, instead requiring it to be converted into American currency. The Statistical Office was established within the Department of State in 1854.

The Gadsden Purchase took place in 1854, bringing the Contiguous United States to its present-day boundaries. The Guano Islands Act was also passed, establishing claims on several uninhabited islands. Conflict between the United States and the United Kingdom over Central America escalated, culminating in the Bombardment of Greytown. Tensions with Spain also rose due to the Black Warrior Affair and the publication of the Ostend Manifesto. In Japan, the United States ended the country's period of isolation with the Convention of Kanagawa.

=== Presidency of James Buchanan (1857-1861) ===
Two days after the inauguration of James Buchanan, the Supreme Court delivered its ruling in Dred Scott v. Sandford, ruling that the rights guaranteed by the Constitution did not apply to people of African descent. Buchanan was criticized for doing little to address the increasingly urgent issue of slavery. Other incidents, such as the raid on Harpers Ferry, further escalated the slavery debate and divided the country. Following the election of Abraham Lincoln at the end of Buchanan's term, 11 states declared their independence from the United States, establishing the unrecognized country of the Confederate States of America in 1861.

The Mountain Meadows Massacre took place in 1857. Further provoking Anti-Mormonism in the United States, Buchanan ordered the Army to occupy the Utah Territory and remove Mormon leader Brigham Young from the position of the territory's governor. The resulting conflict set off the Utah War. American foreign policy continued to focus on Central America in the late 1850s, working to limit British influence in the region. The United States also strengthened ties with China through the Treaty of Tientsin.

The Buchanan administration was criticized for its deep corruption, patronage, and bribery. The Covode Committee found widespread corruption in the administration, finding that the Buchanan administration was to that point the most corrupt in American history. The Panic of 1857 began following the failure of the Ohio Life Insurance and Trust Company. This too served divide the North and the South, as the North was disproportionately affected and both blamed the other for the recession. At the end of his presidency, Buchanan signed the Morrill Tariff into law, starting a new period of protectionist tariffs in the United States.

The Government Printing Office was established in 1861. Three states were admitted during the presidency of James Buchanan: Minnesota in 1858, Oregon in 1859, and Kansas in 1861.

=== Presidency of Abraham Lincoln (1861-1865) ===
The American Civil War began in 1861 between the United States and the breakaway Confederate States. The Confederacy ratified the Constitution of the Confederate States in 1861, establishing a presidential system similar to the United States. Many Congressmen from Southern states left the United States Congress to serve in the Confederate States Congress, and many more were expelled from the United States Congress. No government officially recognized the Confederacy as a legitimate state, and it was considered to be an illegal sedition within the United States.

The Confiscation Act of 1861 allowed the federal government to confiscate any property that could help the South in the Civil War, including slaves. It was supplemented by the Confiscation Act of 1862 that explicitly gave the president the power to emancipate slaves. Slavery was made illegal in Washington D.C. the same year with the Compensated Emancipation Act. Lincoln used his power of emancipation to issue the Emancipation Proclamation, legally ordering the end of slavery in the South when it came into force on January 1, 1863. As the Civil War ended, the Freedmen's Bureau was created to facilitate reconstruction. On April 15, 1865, Lincoln became the first president to be assassinated.

The first military draft in the United States was established with the Militia Act of 1862 and the Enrollment Act. To further the war effort, Lincoln was given authority by Congress to suspend habeas corpus in 1863. Hundreds of citizens were detained by the United States government for expressing sympathies toward the Confederacy for fear that they were spies. American foreign policy during the Civil War was designed to prevent other countries from interfering on behalf of the Confederacy. The United Kingdom and France both maintained tacit relations with the Southern states, but neither recognized the Confederacy or aligned with it over the United States. The Navy first began using hospital ships during the Civil War.

The Civil War prompted significant reform to the government revenue system. The first federal income tax was established by the Revenue Act of 1861. It was modified to be a progressive tax by the Revenue Act of 1862, and a Commissioner of Internal Revenue was established to enforce tax collection. The income tax was then increased by the Revenue Act of 1864. The United States began using demand notes in 1861 and United States Notes in 1862. The Bureau of Engraving and Printing was established under the Department of the Treasury in 1862 the facilitate the production of banknotes. A new national bank system was established in 1863 with the National Bank Act, and legislation to prevent defrauding of the government was passed in the False Claims Act the same year. The treasury also began printing the phrase In God We Trust on coins in 1864.

The Department of Agriculture was established in 1862, though it consisted of only eight employees and was not given cabinet status. The Morrill Act of 1862 established land-grant universities in the United States, the National Academy of Sciences was founded in 1863, and the Yosemite Grant was approved in 1864, setting aside what would eventually become Yosemite National Park. This would be the first time that park land was set aside by the federal government specifically for conservation and tourism. In the judicial branch, the Tenth Circuit Act of 1863 created a tenth circuit court and added a tenth Associate Justice to the Supreme Court.

West Virginia was admitted as a state in 1863 to remain in the union after the secession of Virginia, and Nevada was admitted as a state in 1864.

== Reconstruction Era (1865-1877) ==
=== Presidency of Andrew Johnson (1865-1869) ===
As the Civil War ended, the primary issue was the readmission of rebellious states. In 1865, President Andrew Johnson granted pardons to most Confederates. Four Reconstruction Acts were passed between 1867 and 1868 established the procedures for reconstruction and readmission. The states that attempted to secede were put under the jurisdiction of five military districts. In order to be readmitted as states, they would have to draft new constitutions guaranteeing universal male suffrage and they would have to ratify the pending Fourteenth Amendment. Tennessee had previously complied with the government and been readmitted in 1866, so it was exempt from the acts. The remaining states were gradually readmitted over the following two years.

Two of the three Reconstruction Amendments were passed during the Johnson administration. The Thirteenth Amendment was ratified in 1865, making slavery illegal in the United States in all cases except as punishment for a crime. The Fourteenth Amendment was ratified in 1868, defining the right to citizenship, guaranteeing rights of due process and equal protection to all citizens, adjusting the method of apportionment of representatives to reflect the end of slavery, disqualifying insurrectionists from holding office, and addressing debt incurred by acts of insurrection. The Civil Rights Act of 1866 was also passed as the first civil rights law in the United States, affirming that all citizens are protected equally under the law.

Johnson had been a Democrat elected as part of a unity ticket, and his presidency resulted in conflict with Congress, which was controlled overwhelmingly by Republicans. 15 bills were vetoed by Johnson only for Congress to override the veto, the most of any presidency. The Tenure of Office Act was passed in 1867 over President Johnson's veto to limit the president's power by forbidding him from removing certain executive officials. Johnson ignored the law, resulting in the first impeachment trial of a United States president, during which Johnson was acquitted by a single vote.

With the threat of France supporting the Confederacy alleviated, the United States facilitated the end of the French-controlled Second Mexican Empire, restoring democracy to Mexico. The Expatriation Act of 1868 was passed to affirm the right of a citizen to renounce their citizenship, and it was passed in response to foreign countries claiming that American immigrants still owed their home country allegiance. The office of Examiner of Claims was established in the Department of State in 1868 to oversee claims by American citizens against foreign countries.

The federal judiciary was restructured with the Judicial Circuits Act of 1866, modifying the boundaries of the circuit courts and requiring that the number of Supreme Court justices be reduced from ten to seven. In 1866, the Supreme Court ruled that the Lincoln administration's use of military tribunals for citizens was unconstitutional in Ex parte Milligan. In 1868, the Supreme Court ruled that all citizens have a right to move between states without penalty in Crandall v. Nevada.

In 1865, the House Committee on Appropriations and the House Committee on Banking and Currency were established, taking on some of the responsibilities of the House Committee on Ways and Means. In addition to the readmitted rebellious states, Nebraska was admitted in 1867 over Johnson's veto. The Alaska Purchase was completed in 1867, transferring ownership of Alaska from Russia to the United States.

=== Presidency of Ulysses S. Grant (1869-1877) ===
The Fifteenth Amendment was ratified in 1870, legally guaranteeing that race cannot be a barrier to voting. Following the amendment's ratification, white supremacist groups such as the Ku Klux Klan used violence to prevent African-Americans from voting. In response, Congress passed the Enforcement Acts and the Civil Rights Act of 1875 to give the federal government the power to intervene in electoral violence and other acts of racial discrimination. The Amnesty Act was passed in 1872, permitting former Confederate troops to seek office under the Fourteenth Amendment.

The Grant administration became notorious for being corrupt and scandal-ridden. The Whiskey Ring, the Star Route scandal, the Sanborn incident, the Trader post scandal, the Black Friday gold panic, and many other scandals and acts of corruption by the Grant administration marred the administration's reputation. The Crédit Mobilier scandal, having taken place during previous administrations, came to light during the Grant administration, further perpetuating the image of a corrupt federal government. Grant himself was uninvolved in most of these scandals and often unaware that they were taking place. In an effort to fight corruption, Grant established the United States Civil Service Commission to regulate appointment of federal employees.

Following unsuccessful efforts in 1830 and 1846 to make Attorney General a full-time job, Congress conducted an inquiry into the creation of a "law department" headed by the Attorney General and composed of the various department solicitors and United States attorneys. The Department of Justice was established in 1870, including the office of Solicitor General. The Weather Bureau was established in the same year. The office of Surgeon General was established in 1871 to lead the Marine Hospital Service. The Post Office Act of 1872 established the Department of the Post Office as a cabinet level department. The Comstock Act was passed in 1873, banning anything that could be interpreted as obscene or sexual from the post, as well as contraceptives and abortifacients.

Monetary policy of the 1870s centered on addressing the economic fallout of the Civil War and the introduction of paper money, as well as the Panic of 1873 and the resulting Long Depression. In anticipation of a sudden influx of silver into the market, the Coinage Act of 1873 ended the status of silver as legal tender. This controversially moved the United States away from the bimetallism system and toward a pure gold standard. Backlash to the shift emerged with the free silver movement, and the status of bimetallism would be a major political issue for decades. The Specie Payment Resumption Act further cemented the gold standard in 1875 by attaching the fiat United States Notes to the gold standard.

The United States did not engage in any major wars under the Grant administration, although there were brief skirmishes, such as a military conflict with Korea in 1871. Grant began the process of annexing Santo Domingo in 1869, but resistance from the rest of the federal government prevented the annexation from being undertaken. Between the United States and the United Kingdom, conflict remained regarding the Alabama Claims of the Civil War. The two countries resolved the issue with international arbitration in 1872, and the United Kingdom agreed to compensate the United States, setting an early standard for international law.

Increased focus on developing and populating the Western United States arose during the 1870s. The General Mining Act of 1872 granted mining privileges for prospectors on federal lands. The Timber Culture Act of 1873 and the Desert Land Act of 1877 incentivized the development of land with afforestation and irrigation, respectively. Yellowstone National Park was established as the world's first national park in 1872. The Naturalization Act of 1870 set standards for the country's naturalization process, and the Page Act of 1875 banned the entry of Chinese women into the United States, effectively ending the country's century-long policy of open borders.

The Judiciary Act of 1869 reversed plans to reduce the Supreme Court to seven justices by setting the number to nine. The Supreme Court ruled that the Bill of Rights is not applicable to state governments in United States v. Cruikshank, though this was overturned by future decisions. New Year's Day, Independence Day, Thanksgiving, and Christmas were established as the first four federal holidays in 1870. Colorado was admitted as a state in 1876.

== Gilded Age (1877-1897) ==
=== Presidency of Rutherford B. Hayes (1877-1881) ===
The presidency of Rutherford B. Hayes began with the Compromise of 1877. The results of the 1876 presidential election were contested in four states, leaving no candidate with a majority of electoral votes. It was agreed that the contested states would be resolved in Hayes' favor on the condition that he end the military occupation of the Southern states as president. This is credited as a major factor of the white supremacist Redeemers taking power, creating the Solid South voting bloc that would last for nearly a century. The debate over patronage and the spoils system also became more prominent under the Hayes administration, as President Hayes sought to do away with them in favor of civil service reform. The Half-Breed faction of Congress advocated for this civil service reform while the Stalwarts became a major political force in opposition to it.

The Great Railroad Strike of 1877 took place early in Hayes' presidency. After it began to threat the security of the nation, Hayes ordered federal troops to end the strike. In response, the president's power to use the military in domestic conflict was curtailed by the Posse Comitatus Act in 1878. Bimetallism was briefly reestablished in 1878 with the Bland–Allison Act, which ordered the creation of millions of dollars in silver coins. The United States Coast Survey was renamed the United States Coast and Geodetic Survey in 1878 to reflect its growing involvement in geodesy. The United States Geological Survey was established as part of the Department of the Interior in 1879. The Department of the Post Office saw major reforms in 1880 to address corruption uncovered during the Star Route scandal.

The first Supreme Court ruling on religious liberties was delivered in 1879 when the court ruled that religious duty is not justification for a crime in Reynolds v. United States. The Supreme Court also delivered a landmark ruling in Strauder v. West Virginia, ruling that excluding jurors based on race infringes on the right to due process. Washington's Birthday was established as a federal holiday in 1879.

=== Presidencies of James A. Garfield and Chester A. Arthur (1881-1885) ===
James A. Garfield had run for president with Chester A. Arthur as a running mate to appease the Stalwart faction that opposed civil service reform. Following Garfield's assassination, Arthur committed to continuing work on reform. In 1883, the Pendleton Civil Service Reform Act ended the spoils system and established a permanent civil service system in the federal government. The establishment of the Civil Service Commission marked a shift in government toward commission oversight in government rather than oversight by individual executives. The Immigration Act of 1882 implemented a tax on immigration and limited the types of immigrants that were welcome. The Chinese Exclusion Act of 1882 expanded a previous ban on immigration of Chinese women, barring all people of Chinese descent from immigrating to the United States.

The government had accumulated a large surplus going into the administrations of Garfield and Arthur. Multiple large spending projects were undertaken, including the Rivers and Harbors Act of 1882 and the construction of new protected cruisers and battleships that formed the beginning of the modern Navy. The Depression of 1882–1885 took place gradually during Arthur's presidency, peaking with the Panic of 1884. In 1883, the Supreme Court found that the Thirteenth and Fourteenth Amendments can't be applied to private citizens in a collection of cases known as the Civil Rights Cases, overruling parts of the Civil Rights Act of 1875.

=== First presidency of Grover Cleveland (1885-1889) ===
Following the November 1885 death of Grover Cleveland's vice president, Thomas A. Hendricks, as well as the previous vacancy in that office during the Arthur administration, coupled with Garfield's lengthy incapacity and death, Congress determined that the Presidential Succession Act needed updating. A revised version was passed in 1886 that replaced Congressional leadership in the line of succession with members of the cabinet. The process of counting electoral votes was also updated with the passage of the Electoral Count Act in response to the contested election of 1876.

The Department of Agriculture was raised to cabinet status in 1889 and the office of Commissioner of Agriculture was reformed as the Secretary of Agriculture. The Marine Hospital Service was reorganized into a commissioned corps in 1889 that would eventually be known as the Public Health Service Commissioned Corps.

Regulation of transit was a priority during Cleveland's first term. Congress passed the Passenger Vessel Services Act of 1886 to disincentivize cabotage in the United States.The Interstate Commerce Act of 1887 was passed to regulate rail companies. This Act also established the Interstate Commerce Commission (ICC), the first independent regulatory agency created by the US government. The agency's original purpose was to regulate railroads (and later trucking) to ensure fair rates, to eliminate rate discrimination, and to regulate other aspects of common carriers, including interstate bus lines and telephone companies. Congress expanded ICC authority to regulate other modes of commerce beginning in 1906. Throughout the 20th century, several of ICC's authorities were transferred to other federal agencies. The ICC was abolished in 1995, and its remaining functions were transferred to the Surface Transportation Board.

Policy regarding Native Americans turned from tribal sovereignty toward accepting Native Americans in United States society. The Dawes Act granted Native Americans the right to individually hold land, and the Supreme Court decision of United States v. Kagama established Native Americans as part of the legal system of the United States.

The first Board of Fortifications was established in 1885 to upgrade American coastal defenses. Other foreign policy at the time primarily regarded access to waters and fishing rights, particularly off the coast of Canada and in the Bering Strait. Legally, the United States rendered itself accountable to certain civil claims through the Tucker Act of 1887. In 1886, the Supreme Court ruled in Yick Wo v. Hopkins that laws enforced in a discriminatory manner violate the Fourteenth Amendment, even if the law does not explicitly mention race. Memorial Day was established as a federal holiday in 1888, at the time called Decoration Day.

=== Presidency of Benjamin Harrison (1889-1893) ===
Economic policy under Benjamin Harrison was affected by the Sherman Silver Purchase Act, which increased the amount of silver in the federal treasury, and the McKinley Tariff, which raised tariff rates. The United States also developed its antitrust law with the Sherman Antitrust Act of 1890. The Dependent and Disability Pension Act of 1890 established pensions for veterans. The General Revision Act of 1891 reversed previous resource management policies and granted the president the power to set aside forest reserves as national forests, and the Shoshone National Forest was separated from Yellowstone to become the first national forest in the United States.

The United States and Germany engaged in a military standoff during the Samoan crisis in 1889, but a tropical storm ended the conflict by destroying most of the participating Naval ships. The Baltimore crisis risked military action with Chile in 1891, but the two countries worked to settle the dispute. The United States supported Hawaiian constitutionalists in the overthrow of the Hawaiian Kingdom in 1893, and the Republic of Hawaii was established in its place. Regarding immigration, the United States moved further away from its previous policy of open borders with the Immigration Act of 1891 and the Geary Act of 1892, which established new limitations on the immigration process.

The United States Board on Geographic Names was established under the Department of the Interior in 1890 to set uniform standards for the names of municipalities in the United States. The United States courts of appeals were established by the Judiciary Act of 1891 to serve as an intermediate court system between the district courts and the circuit courts. Six states were admitted during Harrison's time in office, more than any other presidency: Montana, North Dakota, South Dakota, and Washington were admitted in November 1889 under the Enabling Act of 1889, while Idaho and Wyoming were admitted in July 1890.

=== Second presidency of Grover Cleveland (1893-1897) ===
The Panic of 1893 triggered an economic depression in the United States. The issue of bimetallism was still a major factor in American economic policy, and the Sherman Silver Purchase Act requiring silver in the treasury was repealed in 1894. The Wilson–Gorman Tariff Act of 1894 lowered tariffs and replaced them with a federal income tax, but the Supreme Court ruled the income tax unconstitutional in Pollock v. Farmers' Loan & Trust Co. the following year. The landmark Supreme Court case Plessy v. Ferguson was decided in 1896, when the court ruled that the doctrine of separate but equal permitted racial segregation in the United States under the Fourteenth Amendment.

Cleveland once again found Hawaii to be a major issue in his second term, and much of American foreign policy considered how to address the country. The Tea Importation Act of 1897 expanded the federal government into food safety by preventing the import of contaminated tea. The Copyright Office was established as a separate agency under the Library of Congress in 1897. Labor Day was established as a federal holiday in 1894. Utah was admitted as a state in 1896.

== Progressive Era and World War I (1897-1921) ==
=== Presidency of William McKinley (1897-1901) ===
The election of William McKinley is seen as the starting point of the Fourth Party System, in which the Republican Party held significant power in federal politics. In 1898, President McKinley led the United States to war with Spain in the Spanish–American War. In addition to guaranteeing Cuban independence, the war resulted in the United States taking control of Puerto Rico, Guam and the Philippines, as well as increasing its influence in the Caribbean. The United States also annexed Hawaii the same year. After the United States took control of the Philippines, it become a party to the ongoing Philippine Revolution, triggering the Philippine–American War in 1899. In its interactions with Europe, the United States negotiated the Nicaragua Canal with the United Kingdom, and it participated in the Tripartite Convention with the United Kingdom and Germany to determine the fate of Samoa. In 1899, the United States established the Open Door Policy with European powers, discouraging them from colonizing or exerting undue influence over China. American foreign policy under William McKinley is credited with establishing the United States as a great power.

Economic debates during McKinley's presidency continued to revolve around tariffs and bimetallism as well as the recovery from the Panic of 1893. The Dingley Act of 1897 restored the high tariffs that had been reduced in 1894, and the Gold Standard Act of 1900 effectively ended bimetallism in the United States, establishing the gold standard as the exclusive monetary system of the United States. The War Revenue Act of 1898 raised taxes to fund the Spanish–American War. The United States enacted its first environmental law with the Rivers and Harbors Act of 1899. In 1898, the Supreme Court ruled in United States v. Wong Kim Ark that children born to foreign residents on U.S. soil are American citizens. In 1900, the Supreme Court ruled in The Paquete Habana that international customary law is integrated into federal American law.

=== Presidency of Theodore Roosevelt (1901-1909) ===
The administration of Theodore Roosevelt heavily prioritized competition law and fair practice in business, prosecuting and breaking up several companies for competition law violations. In 1905, the Supreme Court ruled that the federal government has the power to regulate monopolies in Swift & Co. v. United States. The Hepburn Act gave the administration additional powers to regulate monopolies and trusts. The Food and Drug Administration was established as the first consumer protection agency, and the Federal Meat Inspection Act granted the Department of Agriculture the power to regulate and inspect meat. Following the Panic of 1907, the Aldrich–Vreeland Act created the National Monetary Commission to investigate federal banking policies in the United States compared to those of major European countries.

The United States Department of Commerce and Labor was created in 1903 by splitting several offices from the Department of the Treasury, including the Bureau of Immigration, Bureau of Navigation, Light House Board, Steamboat Inspection Service, Coast and Geodetic Survey, Bureau of Standards. The Department of the Interior's Bureau of Statistics and the independent United States Fish Commission were also moved into the new department, and the Bureau of Corporations and the Bureau of Census were created underneath the department.

The Roosevelt administration also prioritized natural conservation. The Bureau of Reclamation was created under the Department of the Interior in 1902, and the United States Forest Service was created under the Department of Agriculture in 1905. The Antiquities Act of 1906 granted the president the power to establish national monuments from federal lands, and Roosevelt established Devils Tower as the country's first national monument. Roosevelt's policies of corporate regulation, consumer protection, and natural conservation were branded together as the Square Deal.

American foreign policy under Roosevelt was dictated by Roosevelt's Big Stick Diplomacy and the Roosevelt Corollary to the Monroe Doctrine. These policies detailed the administration's involvement in Latin American affairs and the establishment of a modernized Navy to enforce decisions in the region, and they were developed following the Venezuelan crisis in which several major European powers attempted to intervene in Venezuelan affairs. In 1903, the United States supported Panama in its movement for independence and made an agreement with the new country to build the Panama Canal. In addition to the Panama Canal Zone, the United States also negotiated the leasing of Guantánamo Bay from Cuba. In 1905, the Roosevelt administration intervened diplomatically in the Russo-Japanese War. President Roosevelt personally mediated the Treaty of Portsmouth ending the war, earning him the Nobel Peace Prize.

With Roosevelt's foreign policy, as well as increasing recognition of the United States as a great power, the United States military was deemed insufficient. The Roosevelt administration prioritized the expansion of the Navy. To demonstrate improvements in the country's Naval power, Roosevelt authorized the Great White Fleet to tour the world. The militia was also reformed in the United States by the Militia Act of 1903, which established the National Guard. In 1908, the Division of Militia Affairs was established to oversee the National Guard.

In response to the assassination of President McKinley by an anarchist, the Immigration Act of 1903 banned anarchists from immigrating to the United States. It also banned epileptics, beggars, and sex traffickers. The Immigration Act of 1907 and the Gentlemen's Agreement of 1907 further restricted immigration to the United States. The Expatriation Act of 1907 also established ways that citizens can retain or relinquish their citizenship.

The Tillman Act of 1907 was the first campaign finance law in the United States, making it illegal for companies to donate to political campaigns. Oklahoma was admitted as a state in 1907.

==== Law enforcement ====
In 1896, the National Bureau of Criminal Identification was founded, which provided agencies across the country with information to identify known criminals. The 1901 assassination of President William McKinley created a perception that the United States was under threat from anarchists. The Departments of Justice and Labor had been keeping records on anarchists for years, but President Theodore Roosevelt wanted more power to monitor them.

The Justice Department had been tasked with the regulation of interstate commerce since 1887, though it lacked the staff to do so. It had made little effort to relieve its staff shortage until the Oregon land fraud scandal at the turn of the 20th century. President Roosevelt instructed Attorney General Charles Bonaparte to organize an autonomous investigative service that would report only to the Attorney General.

Bonaparte reached out to other agencies, including the U.S. Secret Service, for personnel, investigators in particular. On May 27, 1908, Congress forbade this use of Treasury employees by the Justice Department, citing fears that the new agency would serve as a secret police department. Again at Roosevelt's urging, Bonaparte moved to organize a formal Bureau of Investigation, which would then have its own staff of special agents.

The Bureau of Investigation (BOI) was created on July 26, 1908. Attorney General Bonaparte, using Department of Justice expense funds, hired thirty-four people, including some veterans of the Secret Service, to work for a new investigative agency. Its first "chief" (the title is now "director") was Stanley Finch. Bonaparte notified the Congress of these actions in December 1908.

The bureau's first official task was visiting and making surveys of the houses of prostitution in preparation for enforcing the "White Slave Traffic Act" or Mann Act, passed on June 25, 1910. (In 1932, the bureau was renamed the United States Bureau of Investigation.)

=== Presidency of William Howard Taft (1909-1913) ===
As Roosevelt's chosen successor, William Howard Taft continued Roosevelt's Square Deal program. The Mann–Elkins Act of 1910 strengthened government control over railroad rates, and the Federal Insecticide Act of 1910 regulated pesticides for consumer safety. The Bureau of Mines was created under the Department of the Interior in 1910. In 1913, the Department of Commerce and Labor was split into two departments, with the old department being renamed the Department of Commerce and a separate Department of Labor being created. The Bureau of Labor Statistics and the Bureau of Immigration were moved into the Department of Labor, and the Children's Bureau was created under the new department. The Department of State was expanded in 1909, with the introduction of many new offices and divisions to conduct relations and commerce in several regions of the world.

President Taft implemented the policy of dollar diplomacy to leverage influence in foreign affairs through economic rather than military means. Foreign affairs under the Taft administration focused on upheaval in several Latin American countries. Conflict with Nicaragua resulted in occupation of the country in 1912. Conflicts of the Mexican Revolution spilled into the United States as the Border War, and upheaval in Cuba resulted in deployment of U.S. Marines for military support. Close relations were also maintained with Panama during the construction of the Panama Canal.

The Federal Corrupt Practices Act was enacted in 1910 and amended in 1911, establishing spending limits and public disclosure of spending in political campaigns. The Lloyd–La Follette Act of 1912 offered protections to government employees from unjust removals, particularly in regard to whistleblowers. The Defense Secrets Act of 1911 criminalized the disclosure of government secrets. The powers of the Speaker of the House were reduced in 1910, and the House of Representatives was capped at 435 members with the Apportionment Act of 1911. Following the retirement of the President pro tempore of the Senate in 1911, the Republican Party could not decide who would hold the position, resulting in a system of rotating the holder of the office.

New Mexico and Arizona were admitted as states in 1912. The Sixteenth Amendment was ratified in 1913, permitting the federal income tax and overruling the 1895 Supreme Court decision of Pollock v. Farmers' Loan & Trust Co.

=== Presidency of Woodrow Wilson (1913-1921) ===
The presidency of Woodrow Wilson was dominated by World War I. While the war started in 1914, the United States did not formally enter the war until 1917, declaring war on Germany in response to attacks on American ships. Joining the Allies, the United States waged war against the Central Powers until Allied victory in 1918. American involvement in the war resulted in contentious domestic disputes. The Selective Service Act of 1917 granted the president the power to enforce conscription against American citizens, while the Espionage Act of 1917 and the Sedition Act of 1918 criminalized interference with or criticism of the war effort. Conscription was upheld in the Selective Draft Law Cases, and the Espionage Act was upheld in Schenck v. United States. The railroads were also nationalized during the war as the United States Railroad Administration. Following the war, the American Relief Administration was established to provide humanitarian aid to the people of Europe.

Prior to American entry into the war, the United States military was expanded and reformed. The Aviation Section, U.S. Signal Corps, the predecessor to the country's air force, was created in 1914. The War Risk Insurance Act created the Bureau of War Risk under the Department of the Treasury in 1914. The Revenue Cutter Service and the U.S. Life-Saving Service were merged to create the United States Coast Guard under the Department of the Treasury in 1915, while the United States Shipping Board was established in 1916. The National Defense Act of 1916 expanded military reserves and upgraded the Division of Militia Affairs into a bureau as the Militia Bureau.

The National Advisory Committee for Aeronautics (NACA) was a federal agency founded on March 3, 1915, to undertake, promote, and institutionalize aeronautical research, due to the expansion of the role of military aircraft, as part of the changing nature of warfare during World War I.

In addition to the World War, the United States also engaged in conflicts in the Western Hemisphere under the Wilson administration. The Border War with Mexico escalated, resulting in several attacks on American border towns. In response, the United States occupied the Mexican city of Veracruz and launched the Pancho Villa Expedition. Following upheaval in Haiti, the United States occupied the country to end the conflict in 1915. The United States similarly occupied the Dominican Republic in 1916.

The United States began the shift from tariffs to income tax as the primary method of generating revenue with the Revenue Act of 1913 and the Revenue Act of 1916. The Federal Reserve was established in 1913. The Board of Mediation and Conciliation was established in 1913. Further developments were made to antitrust law, including the establishment of the Federal Trade Commission and the passing of the Clayton Antitrust Act of 1914. Following the proliferation of the automobile in American society, the Federal Aid Road Act of 1916 authorized the first federally funded highway.

Three amendments to the Constitution were ratified during Wilson's presidency. The Seventeenth Amendment was ratified in 1913, allowing citizens to elect their senators directly. The Eighteenth Amendment was ratified in 1919, banning alcohol in the United States and beginning the era of Prohibition with the Volstead Act. The Nineteenth Amendment was ratified in 1920, guaranteeing women's suffrage in the United States.

The federal government created its first drug policy with the Harrison Narcotics Tax Act of 1914. The National Park Service was established under the Department of the Interior in 1916. The United States purchased what would become the United States Virgin Islands from the Netherlands in 1917. Standardized time zones and daylight saving time were established in 1918. Following a rise in left-wing terrorism, the Palmer Raids were conducted to seek out and deport socialists in 1919 and 1920. During the 1920 United States census, the one-drop rule was adopted for racial classifications.

== Roaring Twenties (1921-1929) ==
=== Presidency of Warren G. Harding (1921-1923) ===
Warren G. Harding prioritized balancing the budget during his administration, resulting in the Budget and Accounting Act of 1921. This act established the Bureau of the Budget under the Department of the Treasury and the General Accounting Office in Congress. The Emergency Tariff of 1921, the Revenue Act of 1921, and the Fordney–McCumber Tariff of 1922 were passed to fund the government. The federal government was heavily influenced by a group Harding's associates during his presidency, known as the Ohio Gang. This group infamously engaged in corruption and malfeasance, most notably as part of the Teapot Dome scandal.

In 1921, President Harding invited delegations from the world's great powers to attend the Washington Naval Conference in Washington D.C. Several disarmament agreements were made, including the Four-Power Treaty, the Nine-Power Treaty, and the Washington Naval Treaty, which prevented an arms race following World War I and maintained peaceful relations between the world's great powers through the 1920s. Immigration to the United States was restricted by the Emergency Quota Act of 1921, which implemented the National Origins Formula. The Sheppard–Towner Act of 1921 provided regulation and funding for maternity and childcare issues, introducing both welfare and women's issues as responsibilities of the federal government. The Cable Act of 1922 was passed to give women rights independently of their husbands.

The Supreme Court clarified the procedures for ratifying constitutional amendments in Dillon v. Gloss.

=== Presidency of Calvin Coolidge (1923-1929) ===
During the presidency of Calvin Coolidge, the United States developed the Dawes Plan and the Kellogg–Briand Pact in an attempt to alleviate issues that resulted following World War I. The Rogers Act of 1924 merged the diplomatic service and the consular service into a single United States Foreign Service under the Department of State. The Immigration Act of 1924 established the United States Border Patrol and applied restrictions to immigration, including a total ban of immigration from Asia. The United States granted citizenship to Native Americans with the Indian Citizenship Act of 1924.

The U.S. Board of Tax Appeals was established in 1924. The Public Buildings Act of 1926 provided funding for federal buildings to be constructed throughout the United States. The United States Numbered Highway System was established in 1926. The United States Navy was expanded with the Cruiser Act of 1929, authorizing the construction of 19 cruisers and one aircraft carrier.

The Supreme Court ruled that the president has the power to unilaterally remove officials of the executive branch in Myers v. United States, the vagueness doctrine was established in Connally v. General Construction Co., and the legislative branch was confirmed to have the power to delegate authority in J. W. Hampton, Jr. & Co. v. United States. The Judiciary Act of 1925 defined what cases would be heard by the Supreme Court. The Federal Arbitration Act of 1925 established a legal system of arbitration that allows for dispute resolution outside of the courts. The U.S. Probation and Pretrial Services System was established in 1925.

== Great Depression and World War II (1929-1945) ==
=== Presidency of Herbert Hoover (1929-1933) ===
The presidency of Herbert Hoover was defined by the Great Depression that began after the Wall Street Crash of 1929 during his first year in office. Protectionist tariffs were significantly expanded by the Smoot–Hawley Tariff Act, which has been attributed as a major factor contributing to the Great Depression. President Hoover issued the Hoover Moratorium in 1931, freezing debts related to World War I in response to the Great Depression. The Glass–Steagall Act of 1932 expanded the powers of the Federal Reserve in an attempt to mitigate the depression. The Reconstruction Finance Corporation was established in 1932 to create the first public works projects to help the unemployed, and the Federal Home Loan Banks were established the same year to provide housing assistance. Labor rights were expanded through the Davis–Bacon Act of 1931 and the Norris–La Guardia Act of 1932.

Other reforms also took place during Hoover's presidency. The Federal Farm Loan Board was reformed into the Federal Farm Board by the Agricultural Marketing Act of 1929, and the Laboratory of Hygiene was reformed into the National Institute of Health by the Ransdell Act of 1930. In response to the Lindbergh kidnapping, the act of kidnapping across state boundaries was made a federal crime by the Federal Kidnapping Act., giving federal agencies, such as the FBI, jurisdiction to investigate kidnappings.

The Reapportionment Act of 1929 reformed how seats of the House of Representatives were delegated to each state. The Supreme Court ruled that symbolic speech was protected under the First Amendment in Stromberg v. California, and it ruled that prior restraint was forbidden under the First Amendment in Near v. Minnesota. The Twentieth Amendment was ratified in 1933, adjusting the schedule for sessions of Congress and inauguration of presidents.

=== Presidency of Franklin D. Roosevelt (1933-1945) ===
Franklin D. Roosevelt was president for 12 years, longer than any other president. During this time, he presided over much of the Great Depression and World War II. Roosevelt's presidency established the New Deal coalition and marked the beginning of the Fifth Party System. The policies of the Roosevelt administration are also credited with codifying modern liberalism in the United States.

Roosevelt developed a domestic policy program to address the Great Depression, marketing it as the New Deal. The New Deal was a series of programs, public works projects, financial reforms, and regulations enacted 1933 and 1936. It produced a significant increase in the size and number of federal programs and agencies, such as the Civilian Conservation Corps (CCC), the Civil Works Administration (CWA), the Farm Security Administration (FSA), the National Industrial Recovery Act of 1933 (NIRA), the Securities and Exchange Commission (SEC), and the Social Security Administration (SSA). They provided support for farmers, the unemployed, youth and the elderly. The New Deal included new constraints and safeguards on the banking industry and efforts to re-inflate the economy after prices had fallen sharply. New Deal programs included both laws passed by Congress as well as presidential executive orders during the first term of Roosevelt's presidency. Many of these programs were challenged in court, and some were upheld while others were struck down. Many of these cases set a precedent for the large scope of the Commerce Clause.

Nazi Germany began invading neighboring countries, resulting in the start World War II in 1939. The United States maintained neutrality at the onset of the war, providing limited assistance to the Allies through programs such as the Lend-Lease program. Following the Attack on Pearl Harbor in 1941, the United States joined the war alongside the Allies against the Axis powers. The War Powers Acts increased the power of the president and the scope of the executive branch. The G.I. Bill of 1944 was passed to provide benefits for veterans of the war. While at war with Japan, Roosevelt ordered the internment of Japanese Americans, which was upheld by the Supreme Court in Korematsu v. United States.

In response to increasing violent crime, the National Firearms Act was passed in 1934 to regulate machine guns and other weapons as the country's first federal gun control law, and the law was upheld as constitutional in United States v. Miller. The Indian Reorganization Act of 1934 reversed the process of integrating Native Americans into the United States, and the Chinese Exclusion Repeal Act of 1943 legalized immigration from China for the first time in over 60 years, permitting 105 Chinese citizens to immigrate to the United States each year. In relations with Latin America, Roosevelt instituted the Good Neighbor policy that reduced involvement with Latin American countries.

The Federal Radio Commission was replaced by the Federal Communications Commission in 1934, which was given expanded responsibilities over interstate telephone and wire communication. The National Archives and Records Administration was established in 1934, and the National Cancer Institute was established in 1937, Fannie Mae was established in 1938. The powers of the Food and Drug Administration were greatly expanded by the Federal Food, Drug, and Cosmetic Act of 1938, allowing the agency to regulate a variety of potentially hazardous products. In 1940, the Weather Bureau was transferred from the Department of Agriculture to the Department of Commerce, and the Civil Aeronautics Authority was merged into the department.

The Twenty-first Amendment was ratified in 1933, ending Prohibition in the United States. In 1936, the Supreme Court ruled in United States v. Curtiss-Wright Export Corp. that the president has plenary power over the foreign relations of the United States. In 1944, the Supreme Court ruled that children have rights independently of their parents in Prince v. Massachusetts.

==== Law enforcement ====
In 1933, the BOI was linked to the Bureau of Prohibition and rechristened the Division of Investigation (DOI); it became an independent service within the Department of Justice in 1935. In the same year, its name was officially changed from the Division of Investigation to the Federal Bureau of Investigation (FBI).

J. Edgar Hoover served as FBI director from 1924 to 1972, a combined 48 years with the BOI, DOI, and FBI. He was chiefly responsible for creating the Scientific Crime Detection Laboratory, or the FBI Laboratory, which officially opened in 1932, as part of his work to professionalize investigations by the government. Hoover was substantially involved in most major cases and projects that the FBI handled during his tenure. His proved to be a highly controversial tenure as Bureau director, especially in its later years. After Hoover's death, Congress passed legislation that limited the tenure of future FBI directors to ten years.

Early homicide investigations of the new agency included the Osage Indian murders. During the "war on crime" of the 1930s, FBI agents apprehended or killed a number of notorious criminals who committed kidnappings, bank robberies, and murders throughout the nation, including John Dillinger, "Baby Face" Nelson, Kate "Ma" Barker, Alvin "Creepy" Karpis, and George "Machine Gun" Kelly.

Other activities of its early decades focused on the scope and influence of the white supremacist group Ku Klux Klan, a group with which the FBI was evidenced to be working in the Viola Liuzzo lynching case. Earlier, through the work of Edwin Atherton, the BOI claimed to have successfully apprehended an entire army of Mexican neo-revolutionaries under the leadership of General Enrique Estrada in the mid-1920s, east of San Diego, California.

Hoover began using wiretapping in the 1920s during Prohibition to arrest bootleggers. In the 1927 case Olmstead v. United States, in which a bootlegger was caught through telephone tapping, the United States Supreme Court ruled that FBI wiretaps did not violate the Fourth Amendment as unlawful search and seizure, as long as the FBI did not break into a person's home to complete the tapping. After Prohibition's repeal, Congress passed the Communications Act of 1934, which outlawed non-consensual phone tapping, but did allow bugging. In the 1939 case Nardone v. United States, the court ruled that due to the 1934 law, evidence the FBI obtained by phone tapping was inadmissible in court. After Katz v. United States (1967) overturned Olmstead, Congress passed the Omnibus Crime Control Act, allowing public authorities to tap telephones during investigations, as long as they obtained warrants beforehand.

==== The New Deal ====
The New Deal was a series of programs, public work projects, financial reforms, and regulations enacted by President Franklin D. Roosevelt in the United States of America between 1933 and 1939. Major federal programs agencies included the Civilian Conservation Corps (CCC), the Civil Works Administration (CWA), the Farm Security Administration (FSA), the National Industrial Recovery Act of 1933 (NIRA) and the Social Security Administration (SSA). They provided support for farmers, the unemployed, youth, and the elderly. The New Deal included new constraints and safeguards on the banking industry and efforts to re-inflate the economy after prices had fallen sharply. New Deal programs included both laws passed by Congress as well as presidential executive orders during the first term of the presidency of Franklin D. Roosevelt.

The programs focused on what historians refer to as the "3 R's": relief for the unemployed and for the poor, recovery of the economy back to normal levels, and reform of the financial system to prevent a repeat depression. The New Deal produced a political realignment, making the Democratic Party the majority (as well as the party that held the White House for seven out of the nine presidential terms from 1933 to 1969) with its base in progressive ideas, the South, big city machines and the newly empowered labor unions, and various ethnic groups. The Republicans were split, with progressive Republicans in support but conservatives opposing the entire New Deal as hostile to business and economic growth. The realignment crystallized into the New Deal coalition that dominated presidential elections into the 1960s while the opposing conservative coalition largely controlled Congress in domestic affairs from 1937 to 1964.

While Roosevelt's main goal was to increase employment, he also recognized the need for a support system for the poor. The Federal Emergency Relief Administration, started in 1933, addressed the urgent needs of the poor. It spent a stunning 500 million dollars on soup kitchens, blankets, employment schemes, and nursery schools. The Federal Emergency Relief Administration was shut down in 1935, and its work taken over by two completely new federal agencies, the Works Progress Administration and the Social Security Administration. FERA was involved with a broad range of projects, including construction, projects for professionals (e.g., writers, artists, actors, and musicians), and the production of consumer goods. They also focused on giving food to the poor, educating workers, and providing nearly 500,000 jobs for women.

The fifteen landmark pieces of legislation passed by Congress during the Hundred Days are:

- Emergency Banking Act (March 9, 1933)
- Cullen–Harrison Act (March 16), modifying the Volstead Act
- Economy Act (March 20)
- Civilian Conservation Corps (March 31)
- Federal Emergency Relief Act (May 12)
- Agricultural Adjustment Act (May 12)
- Emergency Farm Mortgage Act (May 12)
- Tennessee Valley Authority (May 18)
- Securities Act (May 27)
- abrogation of gold clauses in public and private contracts (June 5)
- Homeowners Refinancing Act (June 13)
- Glass-Steagall Act (June 15)
- Farm Credit Act (June 15)
- Emergency Railroad Transportation Act (June 15)
- National Industrial Recovery Act (June 16)

Some of the key agencies established during the early period of the Roosevelt Administration include the following:

- The U.S. Securities and Exchange Commission (SEC) is an independent agency of the United States federal government, created in the aftermath of the Wall Street Crash of 1929. The primary purpose of the SEC is to enforce the law against market manipulation. In addition to the Securities Exchange Act of 1934, which created it, the SEC enforces the Securities Act of 1933, the Trust Indenture Act of 1939, the Investment Company Act of 1940, the Investment Advisers Act of 1940, the Sarbanes–Oxley Act of 2002, and other statutes. The SEC was created by Section 4 of the Securities Exchange Act of 1934 (now codified as 15 U.S.C. § 78d and commonly referred to as the Exchange Act or the 1934 Act).
- The Civilian Conservation Corps allowed unemployed men to work for six months on conservation projects such as planting trees, preventing soil erosion, and combating forest fires. Workers lived in militarized camps across the country and made $30 per month. By the end of the program in 1942, the CCC had employed 2.5 million men. On March 9, 1933, Roosevelt ordered some of his senior staff to put unemployed men to work on conservation projects by summertime. On March 21, he submitted a proposal to Congress calling for the employment of 250,000 men by June. It was soon passed into law on March 31, giving the President authority to establish the Emergency Conservation Work (ECW) program. The ECW was the program's official name until 1937, when the popular name of CCC became official. Above and beyond other Hundred-Day programs, the CCC was Roosevelt's favorite creation, often called his "pet."
- In May 1933, the Agricultural Adjustment Administration was created in order to raise crop prices in response to the rural economic crisis. The administration helped to control the falling prices by setting quotas to reduce farm production. Beyond price adjustment, the act helped farmers to modernize and implement innovative farming methods. In extreme cases, the agency helped farmers with their mortgages and provided direct payment for farmers who would agree to sign acreage reduction contracts.
- The National Industry Recovery Act came into force on June 16, 1933, just five days after the end of 100 days. The act was an attempt to rebuild the economy from the severe deflation caused by the Great Depression. The act consisted of two sections; the first promoted industrial recovery, and the second established the Public Works Administration (PWA). The National Industry Recovery Act set up the Public Works Administration (PWA) and the National Recovery Administration (NRA). The PWA used government money to build infrastructure, such as roads and bridges, for the state. This demand for construction created new jobs, which achieved Roosevelt's main priority. The National Recovery Act also improved working conditions and outlawed child labor. Wages increased, making it possible for workers to earn and spend more.
- The Tennessee Valley Authority was established for building dams on the Tennessee River. These dams were designed to stimulate farming in the area while creating hydroelectricity, as well as prevent flooding and deforestation. The hydroelectric power was used effectively to provide electricity for nearby houses. The TVA marked the first time the federal government competed against private companies in the business of selling electricity.

== Post-War Era (1945-1963) ==
=== Presidency of Harry S. Truman (1945-1953) ===
Harry S. Truman was inaugurated in the final days of World War II. The Allies ended the war in the European Theater following the Battle of Berlin in May 1945. In August 1945, Truman ordered the atomic bombings of Hiroshima and Nagasaki, ending the war in the Pacific War. President Truman remains the only person to ever order an atomic bombing as an act of war. The end of World War II brought the beginning of the Cold War between the United States and the Soviet Union. The Korean War began in 1950 as a proxy war between the two countries following the invasion of South Korea.

As the Cold War began, American foreign policy shifted toward the Truman Doctrine, with a focus on containment of Communism. The United States was a founding member of the United Nations, the Organization of American States (OAS), and NATO in the 1940s. The United Nations was created as a diplomatic body to facilitate negotiations and agreements between countries, the OAS was created to strengthen relations with Latin America as allies in the Cold War, and NATO was created as a military body to directly oppose the Soviet Union. The Marshall Plan was undertaken in 1948 to provide billions of dollars in support for the war-torn countries of Western Europe.

The Cold War triggered the second red scare, resulting in a period of anti-Communist investigations in Congress. The House established the House Un-American Activities Committee as a standing committee in 1945 to investigate those suspected of having allegiances to other countries. Senator Joseph McCarthy began a series of investigations in the Senate, and his practice of wide, unsubstantiated accusations became known as McCarthyism.

The United States military structure was reorganized with the National Security Act of 1947, which created the Department of Defense. The Department of War was renamed as the Department of the Army, and the Department of the Air Force was established. The three departments of the Army, Navy, and Air Force were then placed under the Department of Defense. The National Security Council and the Central Intelligence Agency were also created by this act, but they remained separate from the Department of Defense. The Military Selective Service Act of 1948 reformed the Selective Service System. The Uniform Code of Military Justice was passed in 1950 as the governing law of the United States military.

The United States Atomic Energy Commission was established in 1946 to address the nuclear technologies developed during World War II. The National Institute of Mental Health was established in 1949 in response to post-traumatic stress disorder among veterans. The National Science Foundation was established in 1950. The Hobbs Act of 1946 made robbery and extortion federal crimes when they affect commerce, giving the government a means to prosecute racketeering. The Taft–Hartley Act of 1947 restricted labor unions from engaging in unfair labor practices. Following threats of a steel strike in 1952, the government seized the country's steel mills to ensure that production continued. Truman argued that it was in his power as president to do so, but the Supreme Court ruled against him in Youngstown Sheet & Tube Co. v. Sawyer.

Congress was reformed by the Legislative Reorganization Act of 1946. Among other provisions, this bill streamlined the system of United States congressional committees, increased staff support, expanded congressional oversight of the executive branch, and required lobbyists to register. The Administrative Procedure Act of 1946 established the modern framework for administrative departments and agencies of the United States government, defining the regulatory powers of these organizations and designating the federal courts as oversight bodies. The Presidential Succession Act of 1947 updated the presidential line of succession, restoring Congressional leadership in the list among other changes.

The Twenty-second Amendment was ratified in 1951, restricting the president to a maximum of two terms in office.

=== Presidency of Dwight D. Eisenhower (1953-1961) ===
The presidency of Dwight D. Eisenhower saw the end of the Korean War and the beginning of American involvement in Vietnam as the Cold War escalated between the United States and the Soviet Union. The Communist Control Act of 1954 banned Communist organizations in the United States as antithetical to American government. When direct military conflict was deemed unnecessary, the United States used covert means to combat Soviet influence, providing support to movements that were combating Communist-influenced governments. The Cold War triggered the Space Race, beginning in 1955 when both nations pledged to launch artificial satellites. In 1958, the National Advisory Committee for Aeronautics (NACA) was replaced by NASA, and the Civil Aeronautics Authority was replaced by the Federal Aviation Agency.

The Civil Rights Movement of the mid-20th century began to see its first major victories in the 1950s. The Supreme Court delivered several rulings against racial segregation during this period, including Brown v. Board of Education. The Civil Rights Act of 1957 provided federal support to enforce desegregation, and the Civil Rights Act of 1960 did so for voting rights. The United States reduced financial support for Native American tribes in the 1950s, instead incentivizing Native Americans to seek employment in urban areas with the Indian Relocation Act of 1956.

The Internal Revenue Code was reformed by the Internal Revenue Code of 1954. The United States began the large scale development of federal highways throughout the United States with the Federal Aid Highway Act of 1956 to facilitate transit and national defense.

The Small Business Administration was established in 1953. The Air Force Academy was established in 1954, and the Amundsen–Scott South Pole Station was established on the South Pole by the Navy in 1956. In 1957, the Supreme Court ruled that obscenity is not protected speech in Roth v. United States. In 1960, the Supreme Court ruled that it is unconstitutional to draw electoral districts in a way that disenfranchises African Americans in Gomillion v. Lightfoot. Alaska and Hawaii were admitted as states in 1959.

==== Department of Health, Education, and Welfare ====
The Federal Security Agency (FSA) was established on July 1, 1939, under the Reorganization Act of 1939, P.L. 76–19. The objective was to bring together in one agency all federal programs in the fields of health, education, and social security. The first Federal Security Administrator was Paul V. McNutt. The new agency originally consisted of the following major components: (1) Office of the Administrator, (2) Public Health Service (PHS), (3) Office of Education, (4) Civilian Conservation Corps, and (5) Social Security Board.

By 1953, the Federal Security Agency's programs in health, education, and social security had grown to such importance that its annual budget exceeded the combined budgets of the Departments of Commerce, Justice, Labor, and Interior and affected the lives of millions of people. Consequently, in accordance with the Reorganization Act of 1949, President Eisenhower submitted to the Congress on March 12, 1953, Reorganization Plan No. 1 of 1953, which called for the dissolution of the Federal Security Agency and elevation of the agency to Cabinet status as the Department of Health, Education, and Welfare. The plan was approved on April 1, 1953, and became effective on April 11, 1953.

The Department of Health, Education, and Welfare (HEW) was created on April 11, 1953, when Reorganization Plan No. 1 of 1953 became effective. HEW thus became the first new Cabinet-level department since the Department of Labor was created in 1913. The Reorganization Plan abolished the FSA and transferred all of its functions to the secretary of HEW and all components of the agency to the department. The six major program-operating components of the new department were the Public Health Service, the Office of Education, the Food and Drug Administration, the Social Security Administration, the Office of Vocational Rehabilitation, and St. Elizabeth's Hospital. The department was also responsible for three federally aided corporations: Howard University, the American Printing House for the Blind, and the Columbia Institution for the Deaf (Gallaudet College since 1954).

Unlike statutes authorizing the creation of other executive departments, the contents of Reorganization Plan No. 1 of 1953 were never properly codified within the United States Code, although Congress did codify a later statute ratifying the Plan. Today, the Plan is included as an appendix to Title 5 of the United States Code. The result is that HHS is the only executive department whose statutory foundation today rests on a confusing combination of several codified and uncodified statutes.

The Department of Health, Education, and Welfare was renamed the Department of Health & Human Services (HHS) in 1979, when its education functions were transferred to the newly created United States Department of Education under the Department of Education Organization Act. HHS was left in charge of the Social Security Administration, agencies constituting the Public Health Service, and Family Support Administration.

In 1995, the Social Security Administration was removed from the Department of Health & Human Services, and established as an independent agency of the executive branch of the United States Government.

=== Presidency of John F. Kennedy (1961-1963) ===
John F. Kennedy served as president during a period of rising tensions in the Cold War. These tensions were exacerbated by the recent Cuban Revolution and the Bay of Pigs Invasion, culminating in the Cuban Missile Crisis in 1962, which threatened nuclear warfare between the United States and the Soviet Union. The United States also sent troops to support South Vietnam in the Vietnam War.

The Foreign Assistance Act of 1961 established the Agency for International Development to institute programs of foreign aid. The Peace Corps was established in 1961. The United States Navy SEAL teams were established in 1962. In 1963, the United States, the United Kingdom, and the Soviet Union negotiated the Partial Nuclear Test Ban Treaty.

The Twenty-third Amendment was ratified in 1961, guaranteeing the right to vote for citizens of Washington D.C. In 1962, the Supreme Court ruled that the federal judiciary has the power to oversee redistricting in Baker v. Carr. The Equal Pay Act of 1963 wrote equal pay for equal work into law, shrinking the adjusted gender pay gap. The Community Mental Health Act of 1963 reformed mental healthcare in the United States. The Department of the Post Office began using ZIP Codes in 1963.

== Civil Rights Era (1963-1981) ==
=== Presidency of Lyndon B. Johnson (1963-1969) ===
Lyndon B. Johnson oversaw the implementation of the Great Society domestic program, which sought to expand government programs to improve quality of life in the United States. Major strides were made in civil rights under this program, with the Civil Rights Act of 1964 making it illegal for the government and for businesses to discriminate on the basis of race, color, religion, sex, and national origin, and these protections were extended to voting with the Voting Rights Act of 1965. Other major civil rights achievements include the Older Americans Act of 1965, the Immigration and Nationality Act of 1965, the Age Discrimination in Employment Act of 1967, and the Civil Rights Act of 1968. These measures were highly controversial in the South, and they're credited with fracturing the New Deal coalition, ending the Solid South, and establishing the framework of the Sixth Party System.

The War on Poverty included several reforms to assist the poor in the United States. The Economic Opportunity Act of 1964 created the Office of Economic Opportunity, the Community Action Program, the Volunteers in Service to America, and the Job Corps. The Food Stamp Act of 1964 created the food stamp program to feed the poor. The Elementary and Secondary Education Act of 1965, the Higher Education Act of 1965, and the Bilingual Education Act of 1968 implemented far-reaching education reforms and made education more accessible for the poor. The Department of Housing and Urban Development was established in 1965, and the Model Cities Program was established in 1966. The Corporation for Public Broadcasting was established in 1967.

The Great Society and the War on Poverty also affected other areas of government policy, including health, transportation, and the environment. The Clean Air Act of 1963 established federal oversight in air quality law. The Cigarette Labeling and Advertising Act of 1966 set national regulations on cigarettes. Medicare and Medicaid were created by the Social Security Amendments of 1965. The Highway Beautification Act of 1965 established regulations to promote health and the environment around national highways. The Environmental Science Services Administration was established in 1965. The Child Nutrition Act was passed in 1966. The National Wild and Scenic Rivers System and the National Trails System were established in 1968.

The Revenue Act of 1964 reduced income taxes at every level, and the Revenue and Expenditure Control Act of 1968 increased taxes while cutting spending. The Kennedy half dollar was minted in 1964, and the Coinage Act of 1965 reduced the silver content in coins to address a coin shortage. The Freedom of Information Act was passed in 1967 to increase the transparency of the United States government.

Congress authorized the use of military force in Southeast Asia with the Gulf of Tonkin Resolution of 1964, allowing the United States to enter the Vietnam War. Under President Johnson, American involvement in Vietnam and Laos would escalate in an effort to prevent takeovers of the countries by Communist dictators, prompting opposition and anti-war protests. The United States also participated in the Dominican Civil War in 1965.

The Twenty-fourth Amendment was ratified in 1964, making poll taxes unconstitutional. The Twenty-fifth Amendment was ratified in 1967, addressing presidential succession and the filling of vacancies in the vice presidency. In 1963, the Supreme Court ruled that the Sixth Amendment guarantees the right to free legal counsel for individuals charged with a felony in Gideon v. Wainwright. In 1964, the Supreme Court ruled that the Congressional districts within a state have to have similar populations in Wesberry v. Sanders. Columbus Day was established as a federal holiday in 1968, and it along with Washington's Birthday, Memorial Day, Labor Day, and Veteran's Day were set to always fall on a Monday as part of the Uniform Monday Holiday Act.

==== New environmental functions ====
In May 1964, the U.S. Assistant Secretary of Commerce for Science and Technology, Dr. Herbert Holloman, established a special committee to review the environmental science service activities and responsibilities of the United States Department of Commerce. The committee recommended that the Department of Commerce consolidate various scientific efforts scattered within and between the Weather Bureau, Coast and Geodetic Survey, and National Bureau of Standards by establishing a new parent agency – the Environmental Science Services Administration (ESSA) – which would coordinate the activities of the Weather Bureau and Coast and Geodetic Survey and bring at least some of their efforts, along with some of the work done in the National Bureau of Standards, together into new organizations that focused scientific and engineering mission support for shared areas of inquiry.

ESSA was established on 13 July 1965 under the Department of Commerce's Reorganization Plan No. 2 of 1965. Its creation brought the Weather Bureau and the Coast and Geodetic Survey, as well as the Central Radio Propagation Laboratory that had been part of the National Bureau of Standards, together under a single parent scientific agency for the first time. Although the Weather Bureau and Coast and Geodetic Survey retained their independent identities under ESSA, the offices of Director of the Weather Bureau and Director and deputy director of the Coast and Geodetic Survey were abolished. These offices were replaced by a new Administrator and Deputy Administrator of ESSA.

==== Transportation Department and agencies ====
In 1964 and 1966, public pressure grew in the United States to increase the safety of cars, culminating with the publishing of Unsafe at Any Speed, by Ralph Nader, an activist lawyer, and the report prepared by the National Academy of Sciences entitled Accidental Death and Disability: The Neglected Disease of Modern Society.In 1966, Congress held a series of publicized hearings regarding highway safety, passed legislation to make the installation of seat belts mandatory, and created the U.S. Department of Transportation on October 15, 1966. In 1967, the new U.S. Department of Transportation (DOT) combined major federal responsibilities for air and surface transport. The Federal Aviation Agency's name changed to the Federal Aviation Administration as it became one of several agencies (e.g., Federal Highway Administration, Federal Railroad Administration, the Coast Guard, and the Saint Lawrence Seaway Commission) within DOT.

Prior to the creation of the Department of Transportation, its functions were administered by the under secretary of commerce for transportation. In 1965, Najeeb Halaby, administrator of the Federal Aviation Agency (predecessor to the Federal Aviation Administration, FAA), suggested to President Lyndon B. Johnson that transportation be elevated to a cabinet-level post, and that the FAA be folded into the DOT. The idea of having a federal department of transportation was first proposed by former president Woodrow Wilson in 1921–22.

At the same time, a new National Transportation Safety Board took over the Civil Aeronautics Board's (CAB) role of investigating and determining the causes of transportation accidents and making recommendations to the secretary of transportation. CAB was merged into DOT with its responsibilities limited to the regulation of commercial airline routes and fares.

The FAA gradually assumed additional functions. The hijacking epidemic of the 1960s had already brought the agency into the field of civil aviation security. In response to the hijackings on September 11, 2001, this responsibility is now primarily taken by the Department of Homeland Security. The FAA became more involved with the environmental aspects of aviation in 1968 when it received the power to set aircraft noise standards. Legislation in 1970 gave the agency management of a new airport aid program and certain added responsibilities for airport safety. During the 1960s and 1970s, the FAA also started to regulate high altitude (over 500 feet) kite and balloon flying.

Legislation signed by President Lyndon Johnson earlier on September 9, 1966, included the National Traffic and Motor Vehicle Safety Act and Highway Safety Act that created the National Traffic Safety Agency, the National Highway Safety Agency, and the National Highway Safety Bureau, predecessor agencies to what would eventually become NHTSA. Once the Federal Motor Vehicle Safety Standards (FMVSS) came into effect, vehicles not certified by the maker or importer as compliant with US safety standards were no longer legal to import into the United States.

Congress established National Highway Traffic Safety Administration in 1970 with the Highway Safety Act of 1970. In 1972, the Motor Vehicle Information and Cost Savings Act expanded NHTSA's scope to include consumer information programs.

=== Presidency of Richard Nixon (1969-1974) ===
Richard Nixon oversaw the conclusion of the Vietnam War and the easing of Cold War tensions through a policy of détente, resulting in the Anti-Ballistic Missile Treaty and the first Strategic Arms Limitation Talks. In response to Vietnam, Congress passed the War Powers Resolution in 1973 to limit the president's power to use military force. In 1974, the Nixon administration was implicated in the Watergate scandal, leading President Nixon to become the first and only American president to resign from office.

The Department of the Post Office was abolished in 1970 and replaced by the United States Postal Service. The Occupational Safety and Health Administration and the National Institute for Occupational Safety and Health were established in 1970. Amtrak was established in 1971. The Legal Services Corporation was established in 1974.

Monetary policy under the Nixon administration effectively ended the gold standard and converted the United States to a fiat currency. The alternative minimum tax was created in 1969, and the president was given the power to establish price controls in 1970.

Many environmental advances were made under the Nixon administration, including the establishment of the Environmental Protection Agency in 1970. Other environmental accomplishments include the National Environmental Policy Act of 1970, the Environmental Quality Improvement Act of 1970, the Clean Water Act of 1972, and the Endangered Species Act of 1973. President Nixon started the war on drugs, including the Comprehensive Drug Abuse Prevention and Control Act of 1970 and the Controlled Substances Act. He also started the war on cancer. In 1969, the United States became the first country to put humans on the Moon.

Congressional procedure was reformed with the Legislative Reorganization Act of 1970, and federal elections were reformed by the Federal Election Campaign Act of 1971. The Supreme Court ruled that free speech includes endorsement of violence in Brandenburg v. Ohio and speech by public school students in Tinker v. Des Moines. The Lemon Test and the Miller Test were created to evaluate the First Amendment in Lemon v. Kurtzman and Miller v. California, respectively. The Twenty-sixth Amendment was ratified in 1971, guaranteeing that the minimum voting age could be no higher than 18 years old.

The Consumer Product Safety Commission was created in 1972 through the Consumer Product Safety Act, to promote the safety of consumer products by addressing "unreasonable risks" of injury (through coordinating recalls, evaluating products that are the subject of consumer complaints or industry reports, etc.); developing uniform safety standards (some mandatory, some through a voluntary standards process); and conducting research into product-related illness and injury. In part due to its small size, the CPSC attempts to coordinate with outside parties—including companies and consumer advocates—to leverage resources and expertise to achieve outcomes that advance consumer safety.

==== New environmental agencies and regulations ====
Beginning in the late 1950s and through the 1960s, Congress reacted to increasing public concern about the impact that human activity could have on the environment. Senator James E. Murray introduced a bill, the Resources and Conservation Act (RCA) of 1959, in the 86th Congress. The bill would have established a Council on Environmental Quality in the Executive Office of the President, declared a national environmental policy, and required the preparation of an annual environmental report.

The 1962 publication of Silent Spring by Rachel Carson alerted the public about the detrimental effects on the environment of the indiscriminate use of pesticides.

In the years following, similar bills were introduced and hearings were held to discuss the state of the environment and Congress's potential responses. In 1968, a joint House–Senate colloquium was convened by the chairmen of the Senate Committee on Interior and Insular Affairs, Senator Henry M. Jackson, and the House Committee on Science and Astronautics, Representative George P. Miller, to discuss the need for and means of implementing a national environmental policy. In the colloquium, some members of Congress expressed a continuing concern over federal agency actions affecting the environment.

The National Environmental Policy Act of 1969 (NEPA) was modeled on the 1959 RCA bill. President Nixon signed NEPA into law on January 1, 1970. The law created the Council on Environmental Quality (CEQ) in the Executive Office of the President. NEPA required that a detailed statement of environmental impacts be prepared for all major federal actions significantly affecting the environment. The "detailed statement" would ultimately be referred to as an environmental impact statement (EIS).

On July 9, 1970, Nixon proposed an executive reorganization that consolidated many environmental responsibilities of the federal government under one agency, a new Environmental Protection Agency. This proposal included merging pollution control programs from a number of departments, such as the combination of pesticide programs from the United States Department of Agriculture and the United States Department of the Interior. After conducting hearings during that summer, the House and Senate approved the proposal. The agency's first administrator, William Ruckelshaus, took the oath of office on December 4, 1970.

EPA's primary predecessor was the former Environmental Health Divisions of the U.S. Public Health Service (PHS), and its creation caused one of a series of reorganizations of PHS that occurred during 1966–1973. From PHS, EPA absorbed the entire National Air Pollution Control Administration, as well as the Environmental Control Administration's Bureau of Solid Waste Management, Bureau of Water Hygiene, and part of its Bureau of Radiological Health. It also absorbed the Federal Water Quality Administration, which had previously been transferred from PHS to the Department of the Interior in 1966. A few functions from other agencies were also incorporated into EPA: the formerly independent Federal Radiation Council was merged into it; pesticides programs were transferred from the Department of the Interior, Food and Drug Administration, and Agricultural Research Service; and some functions were transferred from the Council on Environmental Quality and Atomic Energy Commission.

Upon its creation, EPA inherited 84 sites spread across 26 states, of which 42 sites were laboratories. The EPA consolidated these laboratories into 22 sites.

In July 1970, the Department of Commerce Reorganization Plan No. 4 proposed the creation in 90 days within the Department of Commerce of the new National Oceanic and Atmospheric Administration (NOAA), consisting of ESSA; the Bureau of Commercial Fisheries and the marine sport fishing program of the Bureau of Sport Fisheries and Wildlife; the Office of Sea Grant Programs from the National Science Foundation; the mapping, charting, and research functions of the U.S. Army's U.S. Lake Survey; the U.S. Navy's National Oceanographic Data Center; the Marine Minerals Technology Center from the Department of the Interior's United States Bureau of Mines; the U.S. Navy's National Oceanographic Instrumentation Center; and the Department of Transportation's National Data Buoy Project, although it did not follow the Stratton Commission's recommendation to include the U.S. Coast Guard in NOAA. One basis for this plan was the findings of the Stratton Commission.

Accordingly, on 3 October 1970, ESSA was abolished as part of Reorganization Plan No. 4 of 1970, and it was replaced by NOAA. Under NOAA, the National Weather Service continued to operate as such, while the Coast and Geodetic Survey was disestablished and its functions were divided under various new NOAA offices. The Bureau of Commercial Fisheries of the United States Department of the Interior′s United States Fish and Wildlife Service was transferred to NOAA, and its fisheries science and oceanographic research ships joined the hydrographic survey ships of the former Coast and Geodetic Survey fleet to form the new NOAA fleet.

In the 1970 reorganization that created NOAA, the ESSA Corps was resubordinated to NOAA, becoming the National Oceanic and Atmospheric Administration Commissioned Officer Corps, known informally as the "NOAA Corps." Like its predecessors, the Coast and Geodetic Survey Corps and ESSA Corps, the NOAA Corps became one of the then-seven (now eight) uniformed services of the United States, and carries out responsibilities similar to those of the ESSA Corps.

=== Presidency of Gerald Ford (1974-1977) ===
Gerald Ford served as the only president not elected to the office of the presidency or vice presidency, having instead been appointed as vice president through the Twenty-fifth Amendment. As president, Gerald Ford continued many of his predecessor's policies. In response to the Watergate scandal, many changes were made to increase government accountability. These include the Presidential Recordings and Materials Preservation Act of 1974, the Privacy Act of 1974, the Foreign Assistance Act of 1974, and the Government in the Sunshine Act of 1976. The Federal Election Commission was established in 1974, and the powers of the president in a national emergency were codified in the National Emergencies Act of 1976.

Stagflation and the 1973–1975 recession had begun shortly before President Ford took office, and much of the administration's domestic policy involved addressing economic issues. The Tax Reduction Act of 1975 and the Revenue Adjustment Act of 1975 were passed to ease the country's economic struggle.

=== Presidency of Jimmy Carter (1977-1981) ===
Jimmy Carter was president during the 1979 oil crisis and the resulting recession. The Federal Reserve was reformed by the Federal Reserve Reform Act of 1977. The U.S. Mint began minting the Susan B. Anthony dollar in 1979. The Torrijos–Carter Treaties established an agreement to return the Panama Canal to Panama at the end of the century. The United States government defined unofficial relations with Taiwan under the Taiwan Relations Act of 1979. In 1979, the U.S. embassy in Iran was attacked and those inside were taken hostage for 444 days in the Iran hostage crisis.

The Department of Energy was established in 1977. In 1980, the Department of Health, Education, and Welfare was renamed the Department of Health and Human Services, and the United States Department of Education was established as a separate department. The offices of inspector general in various departments were standardized under the Inspector General Act of 1978. The Civil Service Reform Act of 1978 abolished the U.S. Civil Service Commission and replaced it with the Office of Personnel Management, the Merit Systems Protection Board, and the Federal Labor Relations Authority. The Foreign Intelligence Surveillance Court was established in 1978.

== Reagan Era (1981-1993) ==
=== Presidency of Ronald Reagan (1981-1989) ===
The United States government saw significant reforms under the presidency of Ronald Reagan. Tax cuts and deregulation were prioritized, moving away from the New Deal principles that had been popular in the mid-20th century. The Economic Recovery Tax Act of 1981, the Tax Equity and Fiscal Responsibility Act of 1982, the Garn–St. Germain Depository Institutions Act, and the Tax Reform Act of 1986 all served this end. The war on drugs was greatly expanded under President Reagan, with laws such as the Aviation Drug-Trafficking Control Act of 1984, the Anti-Drug Abuse Act of 1986 and the Anti-Drug Abuse Act of 1988 being passed.

The United States began operating under the Reagan Doctrine during the 1980s, building up the American military and taking a hardline stance against the Soviet Union. The United States provided financial support for groups fighting Communist governments, and the United States military invaded Grenada in 1983 to end a military dictatorship. The United States entered into its first free trade agreement when it agreed to the Israel–United States Free Trade Agreement in 1985. The Canada–United States Free Trade Agreement was established in 1988.

The federal government expanded its power over the states with the National Minimum Drinking Age Act, requiring states to pass legal drinking age laws or be penalized with reduced federal funding. The Department of Defense was reformed by the Goldwater–Nichols Act of 1986. The Veterans Administration was reformed into the cabinet level Department of Veterans Affairs in 1988. The National Archives and Records Administration was made into an independent agency in 1985. Martin Luther King Jr. Day was established as a federal holiday in 1986.

=== Presidency of George H. W. Bush (1989-1993) ===
The Cold War ended under the presidency of George H. W. Bush, as the Soviet Union was dissolved in 1991. Following the Iraqi invasion of Kuwait, the United States government lobbied the United Nations to intervene. In 1991, the United States led a coalition of countries in the Gulf War, freeing Kuwait from Iraqi occupation. The United States also undertook an invasion of Panama to overthrow the dictatorship of Manuel Noriega in 1989. The United States government expanded civil rights protections to Americans with disabilities with the Americans with Disabilities Act of 1990. The United States underwent an economic recession in the early 1990s.

== Post-Cold War Era (1993-2009) ==
=== Presidency of Bill Clinton (1993-2001) ===
The United States underwent an economic boom in the 1990s. Bill Clinton oversaw the reduction of the deficit and the creation of a budget surplus in the United States. The Canada–United States Free Trade Agreement was superseded by the North American Free Trade Agreement in 1994, including Mexico in the agreement. The Internal Revenue Service was reformed by the Internal Revenue Service Restructuring and Reform Act of 1998. Internet taxes were banned by the Internet Tax Freedom Act of 1998. The Gramm–Leach–Bliley Act of 1999 deregulated the finance industry.

Efforts to reduce crime under the Clinton administration included the Brady Handgun Violence Prevention Act of 1994, the Violent Crime Control and Law Enforcement Act of 1994, and the Domestic Violence Offender Gun Ban of 1997, which established strong federal gun control, defined several new federal crimes, and required states to establish sex offender registries. The United States led a NATO intervention during the Kosovo War to repel a Yugoslavian invasion of Kosovo. The don't ask, don't tell policy was established within the Department of Defense, affording some rights to closeted gay and lesbian service-members while banning openly gay and lesbian people from serving. The Defense of Marriage Act of 1996 denied recognition of same-sex marriage.

President Clinton became the second president to be impeached in 1998 following the Clinton–Lewinsky scandal.

=== Presidency of George W. Bush (2001-2009) ===
The September 11 attacks occurred during the presidency of George W. Bush, prompting major government reorganization, security reforms, and the war on terror. The Patriot Act greatly expanded the government's anti-terrorism measures, including expansions of government surveillance and legal justifications to treat suspects as terrorists. The Aviation and Transportation Security Act of 2001 created the Transportation Security Administration, and the Homeland Security Act of 2002 created the Department of Homeland Security. In response to the attacks, the United States invaded Afghanistan in 2001 and overthrew the Taliban government that harbored Al-Qaeda. The United States also invaded Iraq in 2003 to overthrow dictator Saddam Hussein. Other responses to terrorism include the Intelligence Reform and Terrorism Prevention Act of 2004 and the Protect America Act of 2007.

Several tax cuts were passed under the Bush administration. The No Child Left Behind Act reformed education in 2002, and Medicare Part D was established in 2003. Near the end of Bush's presidency, the 2008 financial crisis began, triggering the Great Recession. The Economic Stimulus Act of 2008, the Housing and Economic Recovery Act of 2008, and the Emergency Economic Stabilization Act of 2008 were passed in response, and the Troubled Asset Relief Program was established to limit the economic burden of the recession.

== Present Era (2009-present) ==
=== Presidency of Barack Obama (2009-2017) ===
Barack Obama presided over the Great Recession and the war on terror that began in the Bush administration. The American Recovery and Reinvestment Act of 2009 and the Dodd–Frank Wall Street Reform and Consumer Protection Act of 2010 were passed in response to the Great Recession. The United States ended its occupation of Iraq in 2011, but military action continued to combat the Islamic State. The Affordable Care Act of 2010 reformed healthcare in the United States. The Joint Comprehensive Plan of Action was established in 2015 to prevent nuclear proliferation.

=== First presidency of Donald Trump (2017-2021) ===
Donald Trump oversaw the Tax Cuts and Jobs Act of 2017. The Taxpayer First Act of 2019 reformed the Internal Revenue Service. The North American Free Trade Agreement was superseded by the United States–Mexico–Canada Agreement in 2020. In 2020, the COVID-19 pandemic shut down much of the United States. The Coronavirus Preparedness and Response Supplemental Appropriations Act, 2020, the Families First Coronavirus Response Act, the CARES Act, and the Paycheck Protection Program and Health Care Enhancement Act were passed in response. The federal government was shut down twice during the Trump presidency, including the longest shutdown in American history at 35 days.

The 2019 National Defense Authorization Act, which was signed into law in 2018, directed the re-establishment of U.S. Space Command as a sub-unified combatant command under U.S. Strategic Command; however, in December 2018, the Trump administration directed that U.S. Space Command instead be a newly established, full unified combatant command, with full responsibilities for space warfighting, which at the time, was under the authority of U.S. Strategic Command.

President Trump became the third president to be impeached and the first president to be impeached a second time, following the Trump–Ukraine scandal and the 2021 United States Capitol attack, respectively.

Operation Warp Speed was a public–private partnership initiated by the United States government to facilitate and accelerate the development, manufacturing, and distribution of COVID-19 vaccines, therapeutics, and diagnostics. The first news report of Operation Warp Speed was on April 29, 2020, and the program was officially announced on May 15, 2020. At the end of February 2021, Operation Warp Speed was transferred into the responsibilities of the White House COVID-19 Response Team.

=== Presidency of Joe Biden (2021-2025) ===
The COVID-19 pandemic continued under the presidency of Joe Biden, and the American Rescue Plan Act of 2021 was passed in response. The United States ended involvement in Afghanistan in 2021. United States foreign policy under the Biden administration was shaped by the 2022 Russian invasion of Ukraine.

== See also ==
- History of the United States Congress
- History of the United States Constitution
- History of the United States Senate
- History of United States foreign policy
- Outline of United States history
- Political culture of the United States
- Political eras of the United States

== Bibliography ==
- Brownlee, W. Elliot (1996). Federal Taxation in America: A Short History. Cambridge University Press. ISBN 9780521565868.
- Foner, Eric (2014). Give Me Liberty: An American History (4 ed.). New York, NY: W. W. Norton & Company, Inc. pp. 815–816. ISBN 978-0-393-92029-1.
- Purcell, Sarah J. (2009). The Early National Period. United States: Infobase Publishing. ISBN 978-1438108834. Archived from the original on 2022-08-01.
- Short, Lloyd Milton (1923). The Development of National Administrative Organization in the United States, Issue 10. United States: Johns Hopkins Press. ISBN 0598686584.
- Smith, Jean Edward (2010). FDR. Random House. pp. 305–332. ISBN 978-1-4000-6121-1.
- U.S. Department of Commerce (1988). From Lighthouses to Laserbeams: A History of the U.S. Department of Commerce. Archived from the original on 2022-08-01.
