= American pioneer =

American settlers who migrated westward

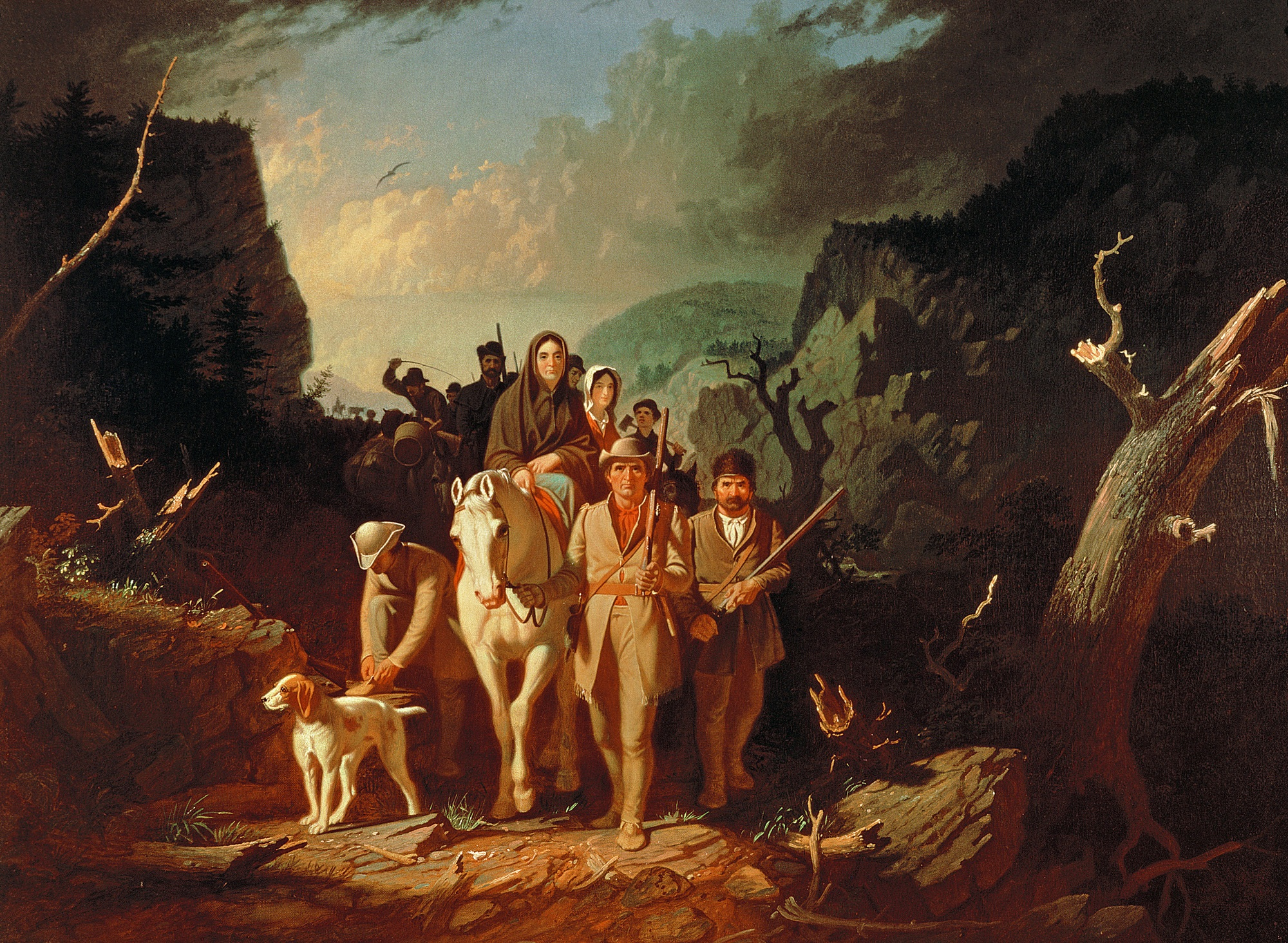
Daniel Boone Escorting the American Settlers Through the Cumberland Gap by George Caleb Bingham (1851–52)

American pioneers were predominantly European American settlers who migrated westward from the British Thirteen Colonies and later the United States, to settle and develop areas of the nation within the continent of North America.

While the pioneer concept and ethos are commonly associated with the settlement of the Western United States, both originated with the settlement of places much further east. For example, Daniel Boone, a key figure in U.S. history, was considered a pioneer for settling in Kentucky, which was beyond the western border of the Thirteen Colonies at the time.

Pioneers settled on land that was previously inhabited by American Indians. The Homestead Acts provided formal legislation for settlers which regulated the settlement process with little to no concern for the existing inhabitants of the land.

== Etymology ==
The word "pioneer" originates with the Middle French pionnier (originally, a foot soldier, or soldier involved in digging trenches), from the same root as peon or pawn. In the English language, the term independently evolved a sense of being an innovator or trailblazer. As early as 1664, Englishman John Evelyn used the term with a self-effacing "workman" meaning when he wrote in his treatise on planting, Sylva, or A Discourse of Forest-Trees: "I speak now in relation to the Royal Society, not my self, who am but a Servant of it only and a Pioneer in the Works".

== Pioneers ==
Various figures in American folklore and literature typify the pioneer. James Fenimore Cooper's The Deerslayer (1841) became the most successful of his early series, the Leatherstocking Tales, about pioneer life in the Province of New York. Laura Ingalls Wilder's Little House on the Prairie series, published a century later from 1932 to 1943 but set sixty years prior, typified later depictions of pioneer families. Daniel Boone (1734–1820) and Davy Crockett (1786–1836) became two real-life icons of pioneer history.

== Historic details and episodes ==
=== History of settlement efforts ===
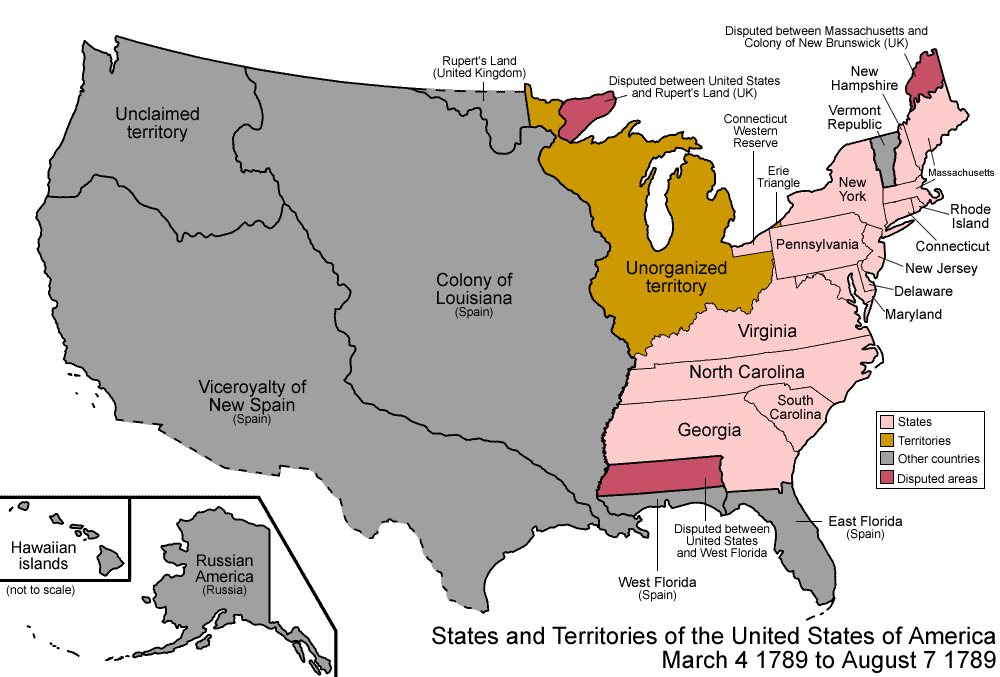
Map of the United States in 1789

The first westward migrations occurred as members of the Thirteen Colonies sought to expand their respective colonies westward. Those whose original royal charters did not specify a western limit simply extended their lands westward indefinitely.

After the United States was officially formed upon the ratification of the U.S. Constitution, federal coordination and legislation began to give settlement a more unified approach.

The Land Ordinance of 1785 was the first official action by the federal government in deciding how political organization of new territories would be handled. Then in 1787 the Northwest Ordinance declared that states could not individually claim new lands, and that westward expansion would be handled by the federal government. In implementing the Land Act of 1804, the government took its first steps towards legislating the manner in which land would be individually claimed by and distributed to settlers.

One federal effort to encourage western travel and settlement was the publication of The Prairie Traveler in 1859, three years before the Homestead Act was passed. Randolph B. Marcy, Captain of the U.S. Army, was commissioned by the War Department to provide a guide for those moving west. It provided not only mileage and stopping points during travel, but also gave advice about what to take on the journey, how to interact with Native Americans and also how to respond to threatening situations such as encounters with bears.

There were many other forms of this process, such as land runs including the Land Run of 1889, when parts of the territory of Oklahoma were first made available to settlers on a first-come, first-serve basis.

=== Details of pioneer efforts and actions ===
As western settlement grew, certain trends began to emerge. Most pioneers traveled in wagon trains with their families and other settlers, banding together for defense and to spread the workload.

Pioneers in the East often had to clear the land, owing to lush forests there. In the Midwest, the task was to bring agricultural fertility to the Great Plains.

Some pioneers moved westward with the intent of claiming land for their families. Others, such as trappers, moved west for commercial reasons, and then remained there when their businesses proved to be profitable.

== Popular culture and folklore ==
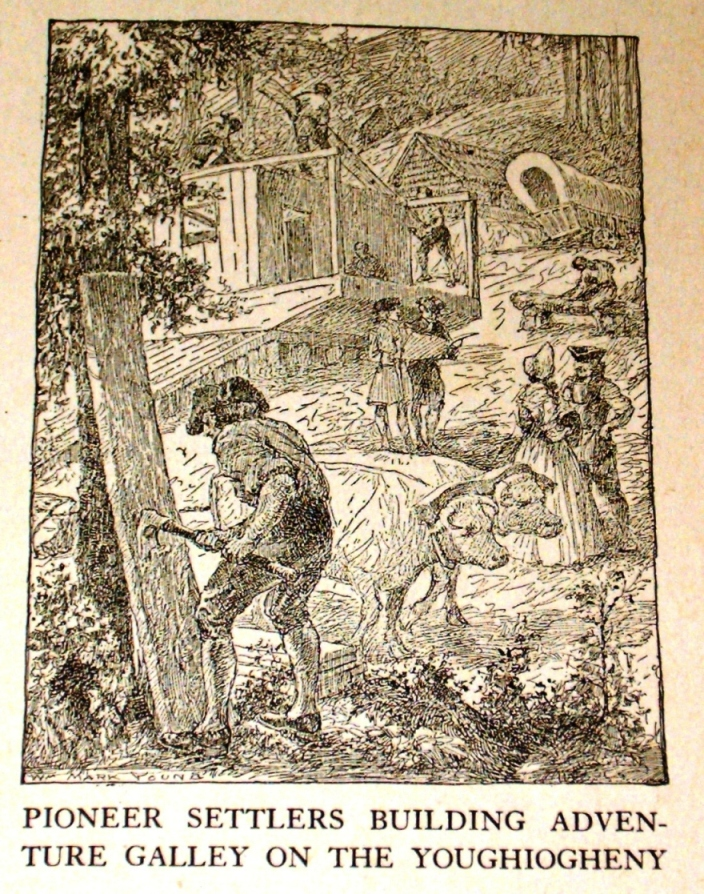
American pioneers building the flatboat Adventure Galley at Sumrill's Ferry on the Youghiogheny River during March 1788.

The figure of the pioneer has historically played a role in American culture, literature and folklore. The pioneer is similar to other iconic figures involved in stories of the "settlement of the West," such as the cowboy, trapper, prospector, and miner; however, the pioneer is distinct in that he represents those who went into unexplored territory in search of a new life, looking to establish permanent settlement.

Various figures in American folklore and literature typify the pioneer. The Deerslayer was the most successful of an early series, the Leatherstocking Tales, about pioneer life in New York. Little House on the Prairie, a century later, typified a later series of novels describing a pioneer family. Daniel Boone and Davy Crockett are two real-life icons of pioneer history.

== See also ==
- American frontier
- American pioneers to the Northwest Territory
- American West
- Donation Land Claim Act of 1850
- Frontiersman
- Land Act of 1804
- Settler colonialism
- Manifest Destiny
- Military Tract of 1812
- Mormon pioneers
- Preemption Act of 1841
- Public Land Survey System
- Spanish-Portuguese Jews in the United States
