= Land Act =

Stock short title used for legislation

Land Act (with its variations) is a stock short title used in New Zealand, South Africa, the United Kingdom and the United States for legislation relating to land.

== List ==
=== New Zealand ===
- The Land Act 1877 (41 Vict No 29)
- The Land Act 1877 Amendment Act 1879 (43 Vict No 21)
- The Land Act 1877 Amendment Act 1882 (46 Vict No 46)
- The Land Act 1877 Amendment Act 1884 (48 Vict No 34)
- The Land Act 1885 (49 Vict No 56)
- The Land Act Amendment Act 1887 (51 Vict No 32)
- The Land Acts Amendment Act 1888 (52 Vict No 17)
- The Land Act 1892
- The Land Act Amendment Act 1893
- The Land Act Amendment Act 1895 (59 Vict No 58)
- The Land Act 1924 (15 Geo 5 No 31)
- The Land Act 1948 (No 64)
- The Land Amendment Act 1950 (No 96)
- The Land Amendment Act 1951 (No 60)
- The Land Amendment Act 1952 (No 46)
- The Land Amendment Act 1953 (No 67)
- The Land Amendment Act 1954 (No 37)
- The Land Amendment Act 1956 (No 42)
- The Land Amendment Act 1958 (No 72)
- The Land Amendment Act 1959 (No 70)
- The Land Amendment Act 1960 (No 68)
- The Land Amendment Act 1961 (No 86)
- The Land Amendment Act 1962 (No 78)
- The Land Amendment Act 1963 (No 93)
- The Land Amendment Act 1964 (No 94)
- The Land Amendment Act 1965 (No 48)
- The Land Amendment Act 1967 (No 86)
- The Land Amendment Act 1968 (No 50)
- The Land Amendment Act 1970 (No 122)
- The Land Amendment Act 1971 (No 105)
- The Land Amendment Act 1972 (No 73)
- The Land Amendment Act 1974 (No 92)
- The Land Amendment Act 1975 (No 82)
- The Land Amendment Act 1977 (No 51)
- The Land Amendment Act 1979 (No 57)
- The Land Amendment Act 1981 (No 44)
- The Land Amendment Act 1982 (No 183)
- The Land Amendment Act 1984 (No 11)
- The Land Amendment Act 1998 (No 66)
- The Land Laws Amendment Act 1907 (7 Edw 7 No 51)
- The Land Laws Amendment Act 1912 (3 Geo 5 No 31)
- The Land Laws Amendment Act 1913 (4 Geo 5 No 24)
- The Land Laws Amendment Act 1914 (5 Geo 5 No 51)
- The Land Laws Amendment Act 1915 (6 Geo 5 No 75)
- The Land Laws Amendment Act 1917 (8 Geo 5 No 27)
- The Land Laws Amendment Act 1918 (9 Geo 5 No 21)
- The Land Laws Amendment Act 1919 (10 Geo 5 No 39)
- The Land Laws Amendment Act 1920 (11 Geo 5 No 43)
- The Land Laws Amendment Act 1921 (12 Geo 5 No 61)
- The Land Laws Amendment Act 1922 (13 Geo 5 No 29)
- The Land Laws Amendment Act 1925 (16 Geo 5 No 50)
- The Land Laws Amendment Act 1926 (17 Geo 5 No 49)
- The Land Laws Amendment Act 1927 (18 Geo 5 No 33)
- The Land Laws Amendment Act 1928 (19 Geo 5 No 37)
- The Land Laws Amendment Act 1929 (20 Geo 5 No 8)
- The Land Laws Amendment Act 1930 (21 Geo 5 No 35)
- The Land Laws Amendment Act 1931 (21 Geo 5 No 40)
- The Land Laws Amendment Act 1932 (23 Geo 5 No 9)
- The Land Laws Amendment Act 1935 (26 Geo 5 No 25)
- The Land Laws Amendment Act 1939 (3 Geo 6 No 35)
- The Land Laws Amendment Act 1944 (8 Geo 6 No 34)
- The Land Laws Amendment Act 1947 (11 Geo 6 No 64)
- The Native Land Act 1873 (37 Vict No 56)
- The Settled Land Act 1886 (50 Vict No 27)

=== South Africa ===
- Natives' Land Act (1913)

=== United Kingdom ===
- The Settled Land Acts
- The Land Registration Act 2002 (c. 9)

The "Land Law (Ireland) Acts" is the collective title of the following acts:

- The Landlord and Tenant (Ireland) Act 1870 (33 & 34 Vict. c. 46) (except Parts II and III)
- The Land Law (Ireland) Act 1881 (44 & 45 Vict. c. 49) (except Part V)
- The Land Law (Ireland) Act 1887 (50 & 51 Vict. c. 33) (except Part II)
- The Land Law (Ireland) Act 1888 (51 & 52 Vict. c. 13)
- The Timber (Ireland) Act 1888 (51 & 52 Vict. c. 37)
- The Land Law (Ireland) Act 1888 Amendment Act 1889 (52 & 53 Vict. c. 59)
- The Redemption of Rent (Ireland) Act 1891 (54 & 55 Vict. c. 57)
- The Land Commissioners' Salaries Act 1892 (55 & 56 Vict. c. 45)

The Landed Property Improvement (Ireland) Acts is the collective title of the following acts:

- The Landed Property Improvement (Ireland) Act 1847 (10 & 11 Vict. c. 32)
- The Landed Property Improvement (Ireland) Act 1849 (12 & 13 Vict. c. 59)
- The Landed Property Improvement (Ireland) Act 1852 (15 & 16 Vict. c. 34)
- The Landed Property Improvement (Ireland) Act 1860 (23 & 24 Vict. c. 153)
- The Landed Property Improvement (Ireland) Act 1862 (25 & 26 Vict. c. 29)
- The Landed Property Improvement (Ireland) Act 1866 (29 & 30 Vict. c. 26)
- The Drainage and Improvement of Land (Ireland) Act 1866 (29 & 30 Vict. c. 40)

=== United States ===
- Harrison Land Act (1800)
- Land Act of 1804
- Land Act of 1820

== See also ==
- List of short titles
