= Relief Act of 1821 =

The Relief Act of 1821, passed February, 16, 1821, was a United States federal law to provide additional financial relief for the purchasers of Public Lands, prior to the effective date of the Land Act of 1820. The 1820 law had ended public land purchases on credit installments, but also lowered both the size and cost requirements of new purchases. This led to discrepancies between current buyers and the earlier buyers, who had had to purchase more land and at a higher price. The Relief Act permitted the earlier buyers to return land back to the government that they could not pay for, and granted them a credit towards their debt for the returned land. Additionally, Congress extended credit to the buyer for eight more years. With the Panic of 1819 in full effect, the shortage of currency made it impossible for many farmers to make the necessary loan payments. The government hoped that with the time extension, the economy would improve.

Prior to 1820, with land forfeitures being both a loss of revenue to federal coffers, and a total loss of the purchasers' efforts, Congress had passed 12 similar relief acts, which alleviated the burden on debtors from the requirements of the installment system. These acts generally extended the time of payment for settlers whose lands were scheduled for forfeiture within that year. The Relief Act of 1821 continued this principle but included additional provisions in response to the new policies set by the 1820 land act. The relief act also gave settlers a 37.5% discount off the original price of the land if they paid the whole amount in full. The act intended to lower the price of land purchased before 1820, to reduce an owner's existing debt to a level compatible with that of the new system, and to limit the number of forfeitures. These relief measures, though well intended, proved misguided. Settlers needed more than just time to pay off their debts, and the number of forfeitures did not diminish.
