= Preemption Act of 1841 =

U.S. law regarding squatters' rights on federal lands

- Long title: An Act to appropriate the proceeds of the sales of the public lands, and to grant pre-emption rights
- Nicknames: Distribution-Preemption Act
- Enacted by: the 27th United States Congress
- Effective: September 4, 1841

Citations
- Statutes at Large: 4 Stat. 453

Codification
- Acts repealed: General Revision Act (1891)

Legislative history
- Introduced in the Senate as S. 1 by Henry Clay on June 2, 1841; Signed into law by President John Tyler on September 4, 1841

The Preemption Act of 1841, also known as the Distributive Preemption Act (27 Cong., Ch. 16; 5 Stat. 453), was a US federal law approved on September 4, 1841. It was designed to "appropriate the proceeds of the sales of public lands... and to grant 'pre-emption rights' to individuals" who were living on federal lands (commonly referred to as "squatters".)

== Provisions ==
The Preemption Act of 1841 permitted "squatters" who were living on federal government-owned land to purchase up to 160 acres (65 ha) for $1.25 per acre ($3.09 per hectare) before the land would be offered for sale to the general public. To qualify under the law, the "squatter" had to be the following:

- a "head of household";
- a single man over 21 or a widow;
- a citizen of the United States or an immigrant intending to become naturalized; and
- a resident of the claimed land for a minimum of 14 months.

The Act further provided that Ohio, Indiana, Illinois, Alabama, Missouri, Mississippi, Louisiana, Arkansas and Michigan, or any state thereafter admitted to the Union would be paid 10% of the proceeds from the sale of such public land.

The Preemption Act allowed individuals to claim federal land as their personal property. To preserve ownership, the claimant had to accomplish specific things to legitimize the claim. One way was to reside on the land. Another was to work consistently to improve the land for at least five years. It was not necessary that the claimant have title to the land; living there and working toward improving the stake were enough. However, if the land remained idle for six months, the government could step in and take the property.

Sections 8 and 9 of the Preemption Act granted 500,000 acres of land to each included state and provided that the proceeds from the sales of such lands "shall be faithfully applied to objects of internal improvement [...] namely, roads, railways, bridges, canals and improvement of water-courses, and draining of swamps."

== Results ==
The Preemption Act of 1841 helped to establish the doctrine of Manifest Destiny in North America. Many Americans got their start due to the Preemption Act. The Kansas and Nebraska Territories were largely settled by such claims. In 1891, the Preemption Act was repealed by Congress and replaced by the Land Revision Act.
