= Land Act of 1804 =

- Long title: An Act making provision for the disposal of the public lands in the Indiana territory, and for other purposes
- Enacted by: the 8th United States Congress
- Effective: March 26, 1804

Citations
- Statutes at Large: 2 Stat. 277

Codification
- Acts amended: Land Act of 1800

Legislative history
- Signed into law by President Thomas Jefferson on March 26, 1804

The Land Act of 1804 was U.S. legislation that refined provisions for the purchase of U.S. public land north of the Ohio River and east of the Mississippi River. At the time, the region was divided into the Indiana Territory and the State of Ohio. The goal of the change was to make migration to the western United States more attractive. Titled An Act making provision for the disposal of the public lands in the Indiana territory, and for other purposes, the act was passed by Congress on March 26, 1804.

== Background ==
The Land Act of 1804 superseded the Harrison Land Act of 1800, introduced by William Henry Harrison, then the congressional delegate representing the Northwest Territory. The goal of the legislation was to attract more immigrants to the western United States by allowing smaller tracts of land to be sold, rather than large tracts that individuals could not afford. The Harrison Land Act reduced the minimum amount of land that could be purchased from 640 acres (2.6 km^{2}) to 320 acres (1.3 km^{2}) and introduced a credit feature by which one-fourth of the purchase price was required at the time of purchase and the balance was payable in annual installments over four years. The minimum price of $2.00 an acre was unchanged from the Land Act of 1796, in which the price was doubled from that set by the Land Ordinance of 1785.

Once the United States Congress enacted the Land Act of 1804 it directly dealt with land in states like Ohio and Indiana. The Act allowed Ohioans to purchase land via credit.

https://www.in.gov/history/2896.htm However, "The credit provision worked badly in terms of government revenue and was eventually repealed in 1820."

https://www.loc.gov/law/help/statutes-at-large/8th-congress/c8.pdf The Land Act of 1804 was passed at the first session of the eighth congress in Washington, D.C. towards the end of the session in 1804.

== See also ==
- Land Act of 1820
- Homestead Acts, starting in 1862, used the 160-acre (0.65 km^{2}) guideline.
