= Land Act of 1820 =

United States federal law

- Long title: An Act making further provision for the sale of the Public Lands
- Nicknames: 1820 Sale Act
- Enacted by: the 16th United States Congress
- Effective: July 1, 1820

Citations
- Statutes at Large: 3 Stat. 566

Codification
- Acts amended: Land Act of 1804

Legislative history
- Introduced in the Senate; Committee consideration by Senate Committee on Public Lands; Signed into law by President James Monroe on April 24, 1820

The Land Act of 1820 (ch. 51, 3 Stat. 566), enacted April 24, 1820, is the United States federal law that ended the ability to purchase the United States' public domain lands on a credit or installment system over four years, as previously established. The new law became effective July 1, 1820 and required full payment at the time of purchase and registration. But to encourage more sales and make them more affordable, Congress also reduced both the minimum price (from $2.00 to $1.25 (equivalent to $29 in 2025) per acre ($495 to $309/km^{2})) and the minimum size of a standard tract (from 160 to 80 acres (647,000 to 324,000 m^{2})). The minimum full payment now amounted to $100, rather than $320. At the time, these lands were located on the frontier within the Congress Lands of Ohio and elsewhere in the Northwest Territory and Missouri Territory, in what was then "The West".

With the high cost of transporting their produce and lack of internal improvements, the law was considered necessary because many farmers were having trouble paying off loans due to the additional economic hardships brought by the Panic of 1819. The previous Land Act of 1804 still included a minimum purchase (160 acres) too large for many individuals, and the price that was established by the Land Act of 1785. This was too expensive for the average family moving west. Squatters too were breaking the laws by trying to get land more cheaply; this was accomplished by moving onto the land before it was acquired by the government and put up for auction. Congress did not like these encroachments on Indian Treaties and had to do something about it. The act was instrumental in ushering in a new age of Western influence. The low price made it possible for settlers to move to the West, thus increasing the population in the west, and with it, Congressional states.

Although the Land Act of 1820 was good for the average American it was also good for the wealthy investors, who had sufficient money to buy the lower cost land. The Land Act helped create a new age of Western growth and influence, but it also increased the confiscation of land from Native Americans. For earlier buyers of public lands however, and although helped by the eight-year credit extension, more than time was required to alleviate their situation. On February 16, 1821, the Relief Act of 1821 was passed to adjust debt repayment schedules for people who had bought public land prior to the Land Act of 1820, when the federal government changed its method of selling public lands.
