= List of bills in the 119th United States Congress =

119th United States Congress
←	118th	120th	→
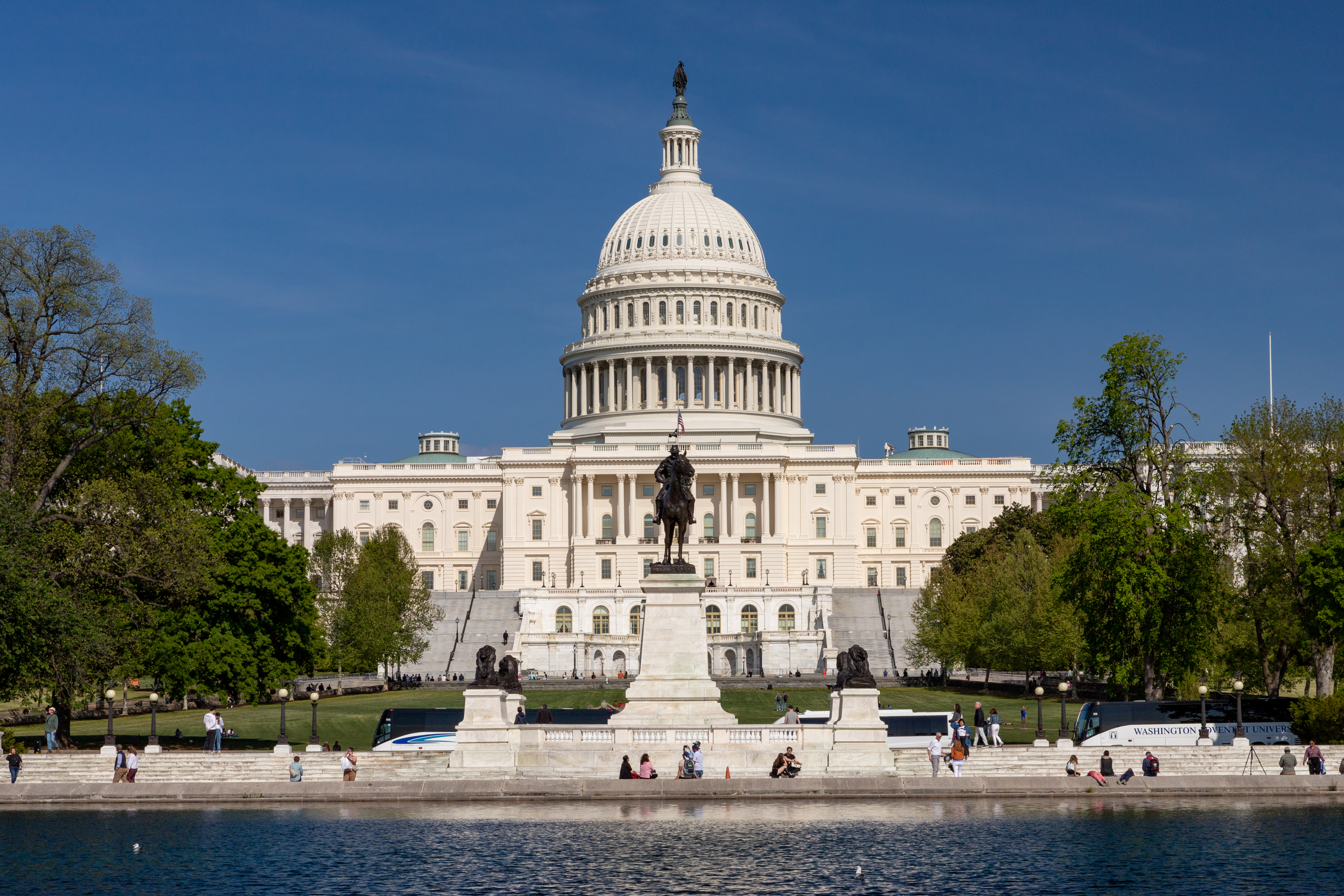
- United States Capitol (2024)

Overview
- Legislative body: United States Congress
- Jurisdiction: United States
- Term: January 3, 2025 – January 3, 2027

Senate
- Members: 100
- President: Kamala Harris (D) until January 20, 2025; JD Vance (R) from January 20, 2025
- Party control: Republican

House of Representatives
- Members: 435 representatives 6 non-voting delegates
- Speaker: Mike Johnson (R)
- Party control: Republican

Sessions
- 1st: January 3, 2025 – present

The bills of the 119th United States Congress list includes proposed federal laws that were introduced in the 119th United States Congress.

The United States Congress is the bicameral legislature of the federal government of the United States consisting of two houses: the lower house known as the House of Representatives and the upper house known as the Senate. The House and Senate are equal partners in the legislative process—legislation cannot be enacted without the consent of both chambers.

Once a bill is approved by one house, it is sent to the other which may pass, reject, or amend it. For the bill to become law, both houses must agree to identical versions of the bill. After passage by both houses, a bill is enrolled and sent to the president for signature or veto. Bills from the 119th Congress that have successfully finished this process become public laws, listed as Acts of the 119th United States Congress.

== Introduced in the House of Representatives ==
=== Passed by both houses, signed by President ===
H.R. number	Date of introduction	Short title	Long title	Description
H.J.Res. 20	January 15, 2025	(No short title)	Providing for congressional disapproval under chapter 8 of title 5, United States Code, of the rule submitted by the Department of Energy relating to "Energy Conservation Program: Energy Conservation Standards for Consumer Gas-fired Instantaneous Water Heaters".	
H.J.Res. 24	January 16, 2025	(No short title)	Providing for congressional disapproval under chapter 8 of title 5, United States Code, of the rule submitted by the Department of Energy relating to "Energy Conservation Program: Energy Conservation Standards for Walk-In Coolers and Walk-In Freezers".	
H.J.Res. 25	January 21, 2025	(No short title)	Providing for congressional disapproval under chapter 8 of title 5, United States Code, of the rule submitted by the Internal Revenue Service relating to "Gross Proceeds Reporting by Brokers That Regularly Provide Services Effectuating Digital Asset Sales".	
H.J.Res. 35	February 4, 2025	(No short title)	Providing for congressional disapproval under chapter 8 of title 5, United States Code, of the rule submitted by the Environmental Protection Agency relating to "Waste Emissions Charge for Petroleum and Natural Gas Systems: Procedures for Facilitating Compliance, Including Netting and Exemptions".	
H.J.Res. 42	February 12, 2025	(No short title)	Providing for congressional disapproval under chapter 8 of title 5, United States Code, of the rule submitted by the Department of Energy relating to "Energy Conservation Program for Appliance Standards: Certification Requirements, Labeling Requirements, and Enforcement Provisions for Certain Consumer Products and Commercial Equipment".	
H.R. 1316	February 13, 2025	Maintaining American Superiority by Improving Export Control Transparency Act	To amend the Export Control Reform Act of 2018 relating to licensing transparency.	
H.J.Res. 61	February 25, 2025	(No short title)	Providing for congressional disapproval under chapter 8 of title 5, United States Code, of the rule submitted by the Environmental Protection Agency relating to "National Emission Standards for Hazardous Air Pollutants: Rubber Tire Manufacturing".	
H.J.Res. 75	March 10, 2025	(No short title)	Providing for congressional disapproval under chapter 8 of title 5, United States Code, of the rule submitted by the Office of Energy Efficiency and Renewable Energy, Department of Energy relating to "Energy Conservation Program: Energy Conservation Standards for Commercial Refrigerators, Freezers, and Refrigerator-Freezers".	
H.R. 1968	March 10, 2025	Full-Year Continuing Appropriations and Extensions Act, 2025	Making further continuing appropriations and other extensions for the fiscal year ending September 30, 2025, and for other purposes.	
H.R. 2215	March 18, 2025	Salem Maritime National Historical Park Redesignation and Boundary Study Act	To redesignate the Salem Maritime National Historic Site as the “Salem Maritime National Historical Park”, and for other purposes.	The act directs the Department of the Interior to conduct and report on a boundary study. The study must evaluate the suitability and feasibility of including in the National Park System, as part of the Salem Maritime National Historical Park, sites and resources in the study area associated with its maritime history, coastal defenses, and military history.
H.R. 2316	March 25, 2025	Wetlands Conservation and Access Improvement Act of 2025.	To amend the Pittman-Robertson Wildlife Restoration Act to provide that interest on obligations held in the Federal aid to wildlife restoration fund shall become available for apportionment at the beginning of fiscal year 2033.	
H.R. 2483	March 31, 2025	SUPPORT for Patients and Communities Reauthorization Act of 2025.	To reauthorize certain programs that provide for opioid use disorder prevention, treatment, and recovery, and for other purposes.	
H.J.Res. 87	April 2, 2025	(No short title)	Providing congressional disapproval under chapter 8 of title 5, United States Code, of the rule submitted by the Environmental Protection Agency relating to "California State Motor Vehicle and Engine Pollution Control Standards; Heavy-Duty Vehicle and Engine Emission Warranty and Maintenance Provisions; Advanced Clean Trucks; Zero Emission Airport Shuttle; Zero-Emission Power Train Certification; Waiver of Preemption; Notice of Decision".	
H.J.Res. 88	April 2, 2025	(No short title)	Providing congressional disapproval under chapter 8 of title 5, United States Code, of the rule submitted by the Environmental Protection Agency relating to "California State Motor Vehicle and Engine Pollution Control Standards; Advanced Clean Cars II; Waiver of Preemption; Notice of Decision".	
H.J.Res. 89	April 2, 2025	(No short title)	Providing congressional disapproval under chapter 8 of title 5, United States Code, of the rule submitted by the Environmental Protection Agency relating to "California State Motor Vehicle and Engine and Nonroad Engine Pollution Control Standards; The 'Omnibus' Low NOX Regulation; Waiver of Preemption; Notice of Decision".	
H.R. 2808	April 10, 2025	Homebuyers Privacy Protection Act	To amend the Fair Credit Reporting Act to prevent consumer reporting agencies from furnishing consumer reports under certain circumstances, and for other purposes.	
H.R. 2815	April 10, 2025	Cape Fox Land Entitlement Finalization Act of 2025.	To provide equitable treatment for the people of the Village Corporation established for the Native Village of Saxman, Alaska, and for other purposes.	
H.R. 3377	May 13, 2025	(No short title)	To authorize the President to award the Medal of Honor to James Capers Jr. for acts of valor as a member of the United States Marine Corps during the Vietnam War.	
H.R. 3490	May 19, 2025	Gerald E. Connolly Esophageal Cancer Awareness Act of 2025.	To require the Government Accountability Office to produce a report on esophageal cancer, and for other purposes.	
H.R. 3497	May 19, 2025	Medal of Sacrifice Act of 2025.	To establish a medal of service for law enforcement officers and first responders.	
H.R. 1	May 20, 2025	(No short title)	To provide for reconciliation pursuant to title II of H. Con. Res. 14.	Popularly known as the One Big Beautiful Bill Act.
H.R. 4	June 6, 2025	Rescissions Act of 2025	To rescind certain budget authority proposed to be rescinded in special messages transmitted to the Congress by the President on June 3, 2025, in accordance with section 1012(a) of the Congressional Budget and Impoundment Control Act of 1974.	
H.R. 4323	July 10, 2025	Trafficking Survivors Relief Act.	To provide for the vacating of certain convictions and expungement of certain arrests of victims of human trafficking.	
H.J.Res. 104	July 10, 2025	(No short title)	Providing congressional disapproval under chapter 8 of title 5, United States Code, of the rule submitted by the Environmental Protection Agency relating to "Miles City Field Office Record of Decision and Approved Resource Management Plan Amendment".	
H.J.Res. 105	July 10, 2025	(No short title)	Providing congressional disapproval under chapter 8 of title 5, United States Code, of the rule submitted by the Environmental Protection Agency relating to "North Dakota Field Office Record of Decision and Approved Resource Management Plan".	
H.J.Res. 106	July 14, 2025	(No short title)	Providing congressional disapproval under chapter 8 of title 5, United States Code, of the rule submitted by the Environmental Protection Agency relating to "Central Yukon Record of Decision and Approved Resource Management Plan".	
H.R. 4405	July 15, 2025	Epstein Files Transparency Act.	To require the Attorney General to release all documents and records in possession of the Department of Justice relating to Jeffrey Epstein, and for other purposes.	
H.R. 4446	July 16, 2026	FAST VETS Act.	To amend title 38, United States Code, to modify the conditions under which the Secretary of Veterans Affairs is required to redevelop the individualized vocational rehabilitation plan for a veteran, and for other purposes.	
H.R. 5371	September 16, 2025	Continuing Appropriations, Agriculture, Legislative Branch, Military Construction and Veterans Affairs, and Extensions Act, 2026.	Making continuing appropriations and extensions for fiscal year 2026, and for other purposes.	
H.J.Res. 130	October 8, 2025	(No short title)	Providing congressional disapproval under chapter 8 of title 5, United States Code, of the rule submitted by the Environmental Protection Agency relating to "Buffalo Field Office Record of Decision and Approved Resource Management Plan".	
H.J.Res. 131	October 10, 2025	(No short title)	Providing congressional disapproval under chapter 8 of title 5, United States Code, of the rule submitted by the Environmental Protection Agency relating to Coastal Plain Oil and Gas Leasing Program Record of Decision.	
H.J.Res. 133	November 4, 2025	(No short title)	Requesting the Secretary of the Interior to authorize unique and one-time arrangements for displays on the National Mall and the Washington Monument during the period beginning on December 31, 2025, and ending on January 5, 2026.	
H.R. 6938	January 6, 2026	Commerce, Justice, Science; Energy and Water Development; and Interior and Environment Appropriations Act, 2026.	Making consolidated appropriations for the fiscal year ending September 30, 2026, and for other purposes.	
H.J.Res. 140	January 12, 2026	(No short title)	Providing for congressional disapproval under chapter 8 of title 5, United States Code, of the rule submitted by the Bureau of Land Management relating to Public Land Order No. 7917 for Withdrawal of Federal Lands; Cook, Lake, and Saint Louis Counties, Minnesota.	
H.R. 7148	January 20, 2026	Consolidated Appropriations Act, 2026.	Making further consolidated appropriations for the fiscal year ending September 30, 2026, and for other purposes.	
H.R. 7147	January 20, 2026	Homeland Security and Further Additional Continuing Appropriations Act, 2026.	Making further consolidated appropriations for the fiscal year ending September 30, 2026, and for other purposes.	
H.R. 7194	January 21, 2026	Nicholas Dockery Medal of Honor Act.	To authorize the President to award the Medal of Honor to Nicholas Dockery for acts of valor as a member of the Army while serving in Afghanistan.	
H.R. 7211	January 22, 2026	(No short title)	To authorize the President to award the Medal of Honor to John W. Ripley for acts of valor during the Vietnam War.	
H.R. 8322	April 16, 2026	(No short title)	To amend the FISA Amendments Act of 2008 to extend the authorities of title VII of the Foreign Intelligence Surveillance Act of 1978 through April 30, 2026, and for other purposes.	

=== Passed by both houses, became law without presidential consent ===
H.R. number	Date of introduction	Short title	Long title	Description
H.R. 6644	December 11, 2025	21st Century ROAD to Housing Act	To increase the supply of housing in America, and for other purposes	This bill revises federal housing programs, including by expanding available financing for affordable housing and providing grants for planning and community development activities.

=== Passed by the House, waiting in the Senate ===
H.R. number	Date of introduction	Short title	Long title	Description
H.Con.Res. 1	January 3, 2025	(No short title)	Regarding consent to assemble outside the seat of government.	
H.R. 21	January 3, 2025	Born-Alive Abortion Survivors Protection Act	To amend title 18, United States Code, to prohibit a health care practitioner from failing to exercise the proper degree of care in the case of a child who survives an abortion or attempted abortion.	
H.R. 22	January 3, 2025	Safeguard American Voter Eligibility Act	To amend the National Voter Registration Act of 1993 to require proof of United States citizenship to register an individual to vote in elections for Federal office, and for other purposes.	
H.R. 23	January 3, 2025	Illegitimate Court Counteraction Act	To impose sanctions with respect to the International Criminal Court engaged in any effort to investigate, arrest, detain, or prosecute any protected person of the United States and its allies.	This bill imposes sanctions against foreign persons (individuals and entities) who assist the International Criminal Court (ICC) in investigating, arresting, detaining, or prosecuting certain individuals. The bill was introduced following South Africa's genocide case against Israel at the ICC.
H.R. 26	January 3, 2025	Protecting American Energy Production Act	To prohibit a moratorium on the use of hydraulic fracturing.	
H.R. 27	January 3, 2025	Halt All Lethal Trafficking of Fentanyl Act	To amend the Controlled Substances Act with respect to the scheduling of fentanyl-related substances, and for other purposes.	
H.R. 28	January 3, 2025	Protection of Women and Girls in Sports Act of 2025	To amend the Education Amendments of 1972 to provide that for purposes of determining compliance with title IX of such Act in athletics, sex shall be recognized based solely on a person's reproductive biology and genetics at birth.	
H.R. 30	January 3, 2025	Preventing Violence Against Women by Illegal Aliens Act	To amend the Immigration and Nationality Act to provide that aliens who have been convicted of or who have committed sex offenses or domestic violence are inadmissible and deportable.	
H.R. 33	January 3, 2025	United States-Taiwan Expedited Double-Tax Relief Act	To amend the Internal Revenue Code of 1986 to provide special rules for the taxation of certain residents of Taiwan with income from sources within the United States.	
H.R. 35	January 3, 2025	Agent Raul Gonzalez Officer Safety Act	To impose criminal and immigration penalties for intentionally fleeing a pursuing Federal officer while operating a motor vehicle.	
H.R. 36	January 3, 2025	MEGOBARI Act	To counter the influence of the Chinese Communist Party, the Iranian Regime, and the Russian Federation in the nation of Georgia.	This bill requires the President to impose sanctions on certain foreign persons, including Georgian government officials, who are undermining Georgia's security or stability.
H.R. 42	January 3, 2025	Alaska Native Settlement Trust Eligibility Act	To amend the Alaska Native Claims Settlement Act to exclude certain payments to aged, blind, or disabled Alaska Natives or descendants of Alaska Natives from being used to determine eligibility for certain programs, and for other purposes.	
H.R. 43	January 3, 2025	Alaska Native Village Municipal Lands Restoration Act of 2025	To amend the Alaska Native Claims Settlement Act to provide that Village Corporations shall not be required to convey land in trust to the State of Alaska for the establishment of Municipal Corporations, and for other purposes.	
H.R. 77	January 3, 2025	Midnight Rules Relief Act	To amend chapter 8 of title 5, United States Code, to provide for en bloc consideration in resolutions of disapproval for “midnight rules”, and for other purposes.	
H.R. 144	January 3, 2025	Tennessee Valley Authority Salary Transparency Act	To provide that the Federal Reports Elimination and Sunset Act of 1995 does not apply to certain reports required to be submitted by the Tennessee Valley Authority, and for other purposes.	
H.R. 152	January 3, 2025	Federal Disaster Assistance Coordination Act	To amend the Disaster Recovery Reform Act of 2018 to develop a study regarding streamlining and consolidating information collection and preliminary damage assessments, and for other purposes.	
H.R. 153	January 3, 2025	Post-Disaster Assistance Online Accountability Act	To provide for an online repository for certain reporting requirements for recipients of Federal disaster assistance, and for other purposes.	
H.R. 164	January 3, 2025	Promoting Opportunities to Widen Electrical Resilience Act of 2025	To amend the Robert T. Stafford Disaster Relief and Emergency Assistance Act to authorize Federal agencies to provide certain essential assistance for hazard mitigation for electric utilities, and for other purposes.	
H.R. 165	January 3, 2025	Wounded Knee Massacre Memorial and Sacred Site Act	To direct the Secretary of the Interior to complete all actions necessary for certain land to be held in restricted fee status by the Oglala Sioux Tribe and Cheyenne River Sioux Tribe, and for other purposes.	
H.R. 186	January 3, 2025	Hershel Woody Williams National Medal of Honor Monument Location Act	To authorize the National Medal of Honor Museum Foundation to establish a commemorative work on the National Mall to honor the extraordinary acts of valor, selfless service, and sacrifice displayed by Medal of Honor recipients.	
H.R. 187	January 3, 2025	Modernizing Access to our Public Waters Act of 2025	To provide for the standardization, consolidation, and publication of data relating to public outdoor recreational use of Federal waterways among Federal land and water management agencies, and for other purposes.	
H.R. 189	January 3, 2025	Securities and Exchange Commission Real Estate Leasing Authority Revocation Act	To amend title 40, United States Code, to eliminate the leasing authority of the Securities and Exchange Commission, and for other purposes.	
H.R. 192	January 3, 2025	Amtrak Executive Bonus Disclosure Act	To amend title 49, United States Code, to require Amtrak to include information on base pay and bonus compensation of certain Amtrak executives, and for other purposes.	
H.R. 197	January 3, 2025	Lake Winnibigoshish Land Exchange Act of 2025	To provide for a land exchange in the Chippewa National Forest in Minnesota, and for other purposes.	
H.R. 204	January 3, 2025	Accurately Counting Risk Elimination Solutions Act	To require that the Secretary of Agriculture and the Secretary of the Interior submit accurate reports regarding hazardous fuels reduction activities, and for other purposes.	
H.R. 207	January 3, 2025	Supporting the Health of Aquatic systems through Research Knowledge and Enhanced Dialogue Act of 2025	To direct the Secretary of Commerce to establish a task force regarding shark depredation, and for other purposes.	
H.R. 29	January 3, 2025	Laken Riley Act	To require the Secretary of Homeland Security to take into custody aliens who have been charged in the United States with theft, and for other purposes.	This bill requires the Department of Homeland Security (DHS) to detain certain non-U.S. nationals (aliens under federal law) who have been arrested for burglary, theft, larceny, or shoplifting. The bill also authorizes states to sue the federal government for decisions or alleged failures related to immigration enforcement.
H.R. 224	January 7, 2025	Disabled Veterans Housing Support Act	To amend section 102(a)(20) of the Housing and Community Development Act of 1974 to require the exclusion of service-connected disability compensation when determining whether a person is a person of low and moderate income, a person of low income, or a person of moderate income, and for other purposes.	
H.R. 226	January 7, 2025	Eastern Band of Cherokee Historic Lands Reacquisition Act	To take certain Federal lands in Tennessee into trust for the benefit of the Eastern Band of Cherokee Indians.	
H.R. 250	January 9, 2025	(No short title)	To direct the Joint Committee on the Library to procure a statue of Benjamin Franklin for placement in the Capitol.	
H.R. 359	January 13, 2025	Cost-Share Accountability Act of 2025	To amend the Energy Policy Act of 2005 to require reporting relating to certain cost-share requirements, and for other purposes.	
H.R. 375	January 13, 2025	Continued Rapid Ohia Death Response Act of 2025	To require the Secretary of the Interior to partner and collaborate with the Secretary of Agriculture and the State of Hawaii to address Rapid Ohia Death, and for other purposes.	
H.R. 386	January 14, 2025	Chinese Currency Accountability Act of 2025	To require the United States Governor of, and the United States Executive Director at, the International Monetary Fund to oppose an increase in the weight of the Chinese renminbi in the Special Drawing Rights basket of the Fund, and for other purposes.	
H.R. 469	January 15, 2025	Semiquincentennial Congressional Time Capsule Act	To provide for the creation of a Congressional time capsule in commemoration of the semiquincentennial of the United States, and for other purposes.	
H.R. 471	January 16, 2025	Fix Our Forests Act	To expedite under the National Environmental Policy Act of 1969 and improve forest management activities on National Forest System lands, on public lands under the jurisdiction of the Bureau of Land Management, and on Tribal lands to return resilience to overgrown, fire-prone forested lands, and for other purposes.	
H.R. 495	January 16, 2025	Subterranean Border Defense Act	To require annual reports on counter illicit cross-border tunnel operations, and for other purposes.	
H.R. 517	January 16, 2025	Filing Relief for Natural Disasters Act	To amend the Internal Revenue Code of 1986 to modify the rules for postponing certain deadlines by reason of disaster.	
H.R. 579	January 21, 2025	Recruiting Families Using Data Act of 2025	To amend parts B and E of title IV of the Social Security Act to improve foster and adoptive parent recruitment and retention, and for other purposes.	
H.R. 586	January 21, 2025	Vietnam Veterans Liver Fluke Cancer Study Act	To direct the Secretary of Veterans Affairs to study and report on the prevalence of cholangiocarcinoma in veterans who served in the Vietnam theater of operations during the Vietnam era, and for other purposes.	
H.R. 692	January 23, 2025	China Exchange Rate Transparency Act of 2023	To require the United States Executive Director at the International Monetary Fund to advocate for increased transparency with respect to exchange rate policies of the People's Republic of China, and for other purposes.	
H.R. 695	January 23, 2025	Medal of Honor Act	To amend title 38, United States Code, to increase the rate of the special pension payable to Medal of Honor recipients, and for other purposes.	
H.R. 706	January 23, 2025	DHS Biodetection Improvement Act	To improve the biodetection functions of the Department of Homeland Security, and for other purposes.	
H.R. 708	January 23, 2025	Strategic Homeland Intelligence and Enforcement Legislation to Defend Against the CCP Act	To establish in the Department of Homeland Security a working group relating to countering terrorist, cybersecurity, border and port security, and transportation security threats posed to the United States by the Chinese Communist Party, and for other purposes.	
H.R. 730	January 24, 2025	Mathematical and Statistical Modeling Education Act	To coordinate Federal research and development efforts focused on modernizing mathematics in STEM education through mathematical and statistical modeling, including data-driven and computational thinking, problem, project, and performance-based learning and assessment, interdisciplinary exploration, and career connections, and for other purposes.	
H.R. 736	January 24, 2025	Protect Small Businesses from Excessive Paperwork Act of 2025	To amend title 31, United States Code, to modify the deadline for filing beneficial ownership information reports for reporting companies formed or registered before January 1, 2024.	
H.R. 754	January 28, 2025	Investing in Main Street Act of 2025	To amend the Small Business Investment Act of 1958 to increase the amount that may be invested in small business investment companies.	
H.R. 758	January 28, 2025	Mail Traffic Deaths Reporting Act of 2025	To direct the United States Postal Service to issue regulations requiring Postal Service employees and contractors to report to the Postal Service traffic crashes involving vehicles carrying mail that result in injury or death, and for other purposes.	
H.R. 776	January 28, 2025	Nutria Eradication and Control Reauthorization Act of 2025	To reauthorize the Nutria Eradication and Control Act of 2003.	
H.R. 788	January 28, 2025	DOE and SBA Research Act	To provide for Department of Energy and Small Business Administration joint research and development activities, and for other purposes.	
H.R. 804	January 28, 2025	Rural Small Business Resilience Act	To require the Administrator of the Small Business Administration to improve access to disaster assistance for individuals located in rural areas, and for other purposes.	
H.R. 818	January 28, 2025	Small Business Procurement and Utilization Reform Act of 2025	To require the Administrator of the Small Business Administration to improve access to disaster assistance for individuals located in rural areas, and for other purposes.	
H.R. 825	January 28, 2025	Assisting Small Businesses Not Fraudsters Act	To prohibit individuals convicted of defrauding the Government from receiving any assistance from the Small Business Administration, and for other purposes.	
H.R. 828	January 28, 2025	Successful Entrepreneurship for Reservists and Veterans Act	To require the Administrator of the Small Business Administration to report on the veterans interagency task force, to require the Comptroller General of the United States to report on access to credit for small business concerns owned and controlled by covered individuals, and for other purposes.	
H.R. 832	January 31, 2025	Small Business Advocacy Improvements Act of 2025	To clarify the primary functions and duties of the Office of Advocacy of the Small Business Administration, and for other purposes.	
H.R. 835	January 31, 2025	9/11 Memorial and Museum Act	To provide a one-time grant for the operation, security, and maintenance of the National September 11 Memorial & Museum at the World Trade Center to commemorate the events, and honor the victims, of the terrorist attacks of September 11, 2001, and for other purposes.	
H.R. 836	January 31, 2025	Emergency Wildfire Fighting Technology Act of 2025	To require the Secretary of Agriculture, acting through the Chief of the Forest Service, and the Secretary of the Interior to conduct an evaluation with respect to the use of the container aerial firefighting system (CAFFS), and for other purposes.	
H.R. 837	January 31, 2025	(No short title)	To require the Secretary of Agriculture to convey the Pleasant Valley Ranger District Administrative Site to Gila County, Arizona.	
H.R. 856	January 31, 2025	Safe and Smart Federal Purchasing Act	To require the Director of the Office of Management and Budget conduct a review to determine the impact of the lowest price technically acceptable source selection process on national security, and for other purposes.	
H.R. 862	January 31, 2025	TSA Commuting Fairness Act	To reduce commuting burdens on Transportation Security Administration employees, and for other purposes.	
H.R. 872	January 31, 2025	Federal Contractor Cybersecurity Vulnerability Reduction Act of 2025	To require covered contractors implement a vulnerability disclosure policy consistent with NIST guidelines, and for other purposes.	
H.R. 877	January 31, 2025	Deliver for Veterans Act	To amend title 38, United States Code, to expand the authority of the Secretary of Veterans Affairs to provide or assist in providing a vehicle adapted for operation by a disabled individual to certain eligible persons, by paying expenses associated with the delivery of such vehicle, and for other purposes.	
H.R. 901	January 31, 2025	Research Security and Accountability in DHS Act	To require the Under Secretary of the Science and Technology Directorate of the Department of Homeland Security to develop a Department-wide policy and process to safeguard research and development from unauthorized access to or disclosure of sensitive information in research and development acquisitions, and for other purposes.	
H.R. 919	February 4, 2025	Chronic Disease Flexible Coverage Act	To codify Internal Revenue Service guidance relating to treatment of certain services and items for chronic conditions as meeting the preventive care deductible safe harbor for purposes of high deductible health plans in connection with health savings accounts.	
H.R. 965	February 4, 2025	Housing Unhoused Disabled Veterans Act	To amend section 3(b)(4) of the United States Housing Act of 1937 to exclude certain disability benefits from income for the purposes of determining eligibility for the supported housing program under section 8(o)(19), and for other purposes.	
H.R. 970	February 4, 2025	Fairness for Servicemembers and their Families Act of 2025	To amend title 38, United States Code, to require the Secretary of Veterans Affairs to periodically review the automatic maximum coverage under the Servicemembers' Group Life Insurance program and the Veterans' Group Life Insurance program, and for other purposes.	
H.R. 975	February 4, 2025	Credit Union Board Modernization Act	To amend the Federal Credit Union Act to modify the frequency of board of directors meetings, and for other purposes.	
H.R. 983	February 5, 2025	Montgomery GI Bill Selected Reserves Tuition Fairness Act of 2025	To Amend title 38, United States Code, to direct the Secretary of Veterans Affairs to disapprove courses of education offered by a public institution of higher learning that does not charge the in-State tuition rate to a veteran using certain educational assistance under title 10 of such Code, and for other purposes.	
H.R. 993	February 5, 2025	Emerging Innovative Border Technologies Act	To require the Secretary of Homeland Security to develop a plan to identify, integrate, and deploy new, innovative, disruptive, or other emerging or advanced technologies to enhance, or address capability gaps in, border security operations, and for other purposes.	
H.R. 997	February 5, 2025	National Taxpayer Advocate Enhancement Act of 2025	To amend the Internal Revenue Code of 1986 to conform to the intent of the Internal Revenue Service Restructuring and Reform Act of 1998, as set forth in the joint explanatory statement of the committee of conference accompanying Conference Report 105-599, that the National Taxpayer Advocate be able to hire and consult counsel as appropriate.	
H.R. 998	February 5, 2025	Internal Revenue Service Math and Taxpayer Help Act	To amend the Internal Revenue Code of 1986 to require additional information on math and clerical error notices.	
H.R. 1039	February 6, 2025	Clear Communication for Veterans Claims Act	To direct the Secretary of Veterans Affairs to seek to enter into an agreement with a federally funded research and development center for an assessment of notice letters that the Secretary sends to claimants for benefits under laws administered by the Secretary, and for other purposes.	
H.R. 1048	February 6, 2025	Defending Education Transparency and Ending Rogue Regimes Engaging in Nefarious Transactions Act	To amend the Higher Education Act of 1965 to strengthen disclosure requirements relating to foreign gifts and contracts, to prohibit contracts between institutions of higher education and certain foreign entities and countries of concern, and for other purposes.	
H.R. 1152	February 10, 2025	Electronic Filing and Payment Fairness Act	To amend the Internal Revenue Code of 1986 to provide for the application of the mailbox rule to documents and payments electronically submitted to the Internal Revenue Service.	
H.R. 1155	February 10, 2025	Recovery of Stolen Checks Act	To amend the Internal Revenue Code of 1986 to allow taxpayers to elect to receive certain replacement refunds electronically.	
H.R. 1156	February 10, 2025	Pandemic Unemployment Fraud Enforcement Act	To amend the CARES Act to extend the statute of limitations for fraud under certain unemployment programs, and for other purposes.	
H.R. 1166	February 10, 2025	Decoupling from Foreign Adversarial Battery Dependence Act	To prohibit the Secretary of Homeland Security from procuring certain foreign-made batteries, and for other purposes.	
H.R. 1234	February 12, 2025	(No short title)	To direct the Librarian of Congress to promote the more cost-effective, efficient, and expanded availability of the Annotated Constitution and pocket-part supplements by replacing the hardbound versions with digital versions.	
H.R. 1318	February 13, 2025	United States Research Protection Act	To amend the Research and Development, Competition, and Innovation Act to clarify the definition of foreign country for purposes of malign foreign talent recruitment restriction, and for other purposes.	
H.R. 1325	February 13, 2025	Commercial Remote Sensing Amendment Act of 2025	To provide for transparent licensing of commercial remote sensing systems, and for other purposes.	
H.R. 1326	February 13, 2025	DOE and USDA Interagency Research Act	To provide for Department of Energy and Department of Agriculture joint research and development activities, and for other purposes.	
H.R. 1350	February 13, 2025	DOE and NSF Interagency Research Act	To provide for Department of Energy and National Science Foundation research and development coordination, and for other purposes.	
H.R. 1368	February 14, 2025	DOE and NASA Interagency Research Coordination Act	To provide for Department of Energy and National Aeronautics and Space Administration research and development coordination, and for other purposes.	
H.R. 1374	February 14, 2025	Securing the Cities Improvement Act	To amend the Homeland Security Act of 2002 to make improvements to the Securing the Cities program, and for other purposes.	
H.R. 1491	February 21, 2025	Disaster Related Extension of Deadlines Act	To amend the Internal Revenue Code of 1986 to make the postponement of certain deadlines by reason of disasters applicable to the limitation on credit or refund, and to take postponements into account for purposes of sending collection notices.	
H.R. 1515	February 24, 2025	Guidance Out Of Darkness Act	To increase access to agency guidance documents.	
H.R. 1526	February 24, 2025	No Rogue Rulings Act	To amend title 28, United States Code, to limit the authority of district courts to provide injunctive relief, and for other purposes.	
H.R. 1534	February 24, 2025	Innovative Mitigation Partnerships for Asphalt and Concrete Technologies Act	To strengthen and enhance the competitiveness of American industry through the research and development of advanced technologies to improve the efficiency of cement, concrete, and asphalt production, and for other purposes.	
H.R. 1692	February 27, 2025	Producing Advanced Technologies for Homeland Security Act	To amend the Homeland Security Act of 2002 to enable secure and trustworthy technology through other transaction contracting authority, and for other purposes.	
H.R. 1701	February 27, 2025	Strategic Ports Reporting Act	To require the Secretary of Defense and the Secretary of State to monitor efforts by the People's Republic of China to build or buy strategic foreign ports, and for other purposes.	
H.R. 1969	March 10, 2025	No Wrong Door for Veterans Act	To amend and reauthorize the Staff Sergeant Parker Gordon Fox Suicide Prevention Grant Program of the Department of Veterans Affairs.	
H.R. 4795	July 29, 2026	Protect Economic and Academic Freedom Act	To amend Higher Education Act of 1965 to penalize those institutions who boycott Israel and Israeli settlements.	

=== Passed by both houses, no presidential consent needed ===
H.R. number	Date of introduction	Long title	Description
H.Con.Res. 9	February 6, 2025	(No short title)	Authorizing the use of the Capitol Grounds for the National Peace Officers Memorial Service and the National Honor Guard and Pipe Band Exhibition.
H.Con.Res. 11	February 11, 2025	Providing for a joint session of Congress to receive a message from the President.	
H.Con.Res. 14	February 18, 2025	Establishing the congressional budget for the United States Government for fiscal year 2025 and setting forth the appropriate budgetary levels for fiscal years 2026 through 2034.	
H.Con.Res. 17	March 5, 2025	Authorizing the use of Emancipation Hall in the Capitol Visitor Center for a ceremony as part of the commemoration of the days of remembrance of victims of the Holocaust.	
H.Con.Res. 22	March 31, 2025	(No short title)	Authorizing the use of Emancipation Hall in the Capitol Visitor Center for a ceremony to present the Congressional Gold Medals awarded under the 'Six Triple Eight' Congressional Gold Medal Act of 2021.

=== Passed by the House, no Senate consent needed ===
H.R. number	Date of introduction	Long title
H.Res. 1	January 3, 2025	Electing officers of the House of Representatives.
H.Res. 2	January 3, 2025	To inform the Senate that a quorum of the House has assembled and of the election of the Speaker and the Clerk.
H.Res. 3	January 3, 2025	Authorizing the Speaker to appoint a committee to notify the President of the assembly of the Congress.
H.Res. 4	January 3, 2025	Authorizing the Clerk to inform the President of the election of the Speaker and the Clerk.
H.Res. 5	January 3, 2025	Adopting the Rules of the House of Representatives for the One Hundred Nineteenth Congress, and for other purposes.
H.Res. 6	January 3, 2025	Fixing the daily hour of meeting of the First Session of the One Hundred Nineteenth Congress.
H.Res. 13	January 6, 2025	Electing Members to certain standing committees of the House of Representatives.
H.Res. 14	January 6, 2025	Electing Members to certain standing committees of the House of Representatives.
H.Res. 21	January 9, 2025	Electing Members to certain standing committees of the House of Representatives.
H.Res. 22	January 9, 2025	Electing Members to certain standing committees of the House of Representatives.
H.Res. 31	January 13, 2025	Electing Members to certain standing committees of the House of Representatives.
H.Res. 38	January 14, 2025	Electing Members to certain standing committees of the House of Representatives.
H.Res. 39	January 14, 2025	Ranking a Member on a certain standing committee of the House of Representatives.
H.Res. 40	January 14, 2025	Electing Members to certain standing committees of the House of Representatives.
H.Res. 42	January 15, 2025	Electing Members to certain standing committees of the House of Representatives.
H.Res. 43	January 15, 2025	Providing for the attendance of the House at the Inaugural Ceremonies of the President and Vice President of the United States.
H.Res. 44	January 15, 2025	Electing Members to certain standing committees of the House of Representatives.
H.Res. 53	January 21, 2025	Providing for consideration of the bill (H.R. 471) to expedite under the National Environmental Policy Act of 1969 and improve forest management activities on National Forest System lands, on public lands under the jurisdiction of the Bureau of Land Management, and on Tribal lands to return resilience to overgrown, fire-prone forested lands, and for other purposes, and providing for consideration of the bill (S. 5) to require the Secretary of Homeland Security to take into custody aliens who have been charged in the United States with theft, and for other purposes.
H.Res. 54	January 22, 2025	Electing Members to certain standing committees of the House of Representatives.
H.Res. 55	January 22, 2025	Electing Members to certain standing committees of the House of Representatives.
H.Res. 93	February 4, 2025	Providing for consideration of the bill (H.R. 27) to amend the Controlled Substances Act with respect to the scheduling of fentanyl-related substances, and for other purposes.
H.Res. 107	February 5, 2025	Electing a Member to a certain standing committee of the House of Representatives.
H.Res. 108	February 5, 2025	Electing a Member to a certain standing committee of the House of Representatives.
H.Res. 117	February 6, 2025	Electing a Member to a certain standing committee of the House of Representatives.
H.Res. 122	February 11, 2025	Providing for consideration of the bill (H.R. 77) to amend chapter 8 of title 5, United States Code, to provide for en bloc consideration in resolutions of disapproval for "midnight rules", and for other purposes.
H.Res. 125	February 11, 2025	Electing a Member to a certain standing committee of the House of Representatives.
H.Res. 137	February 14, 2025	Resolution designating the House Press Gallery (Rooms H-315, H-316, H-317, H-318, and H-319 in the United States Capitol) as the 'Frederick Douglass Press Gallery’
H.Res. 153	February 24, 2025	Expressing condolences to the families, friends, and loved ones of the victims of the crash of American Eagle Flight 5342 and PAT 25, and for other purposes.
H.Res. 161	February 25, 2025	Providing for consideration of the joint resolution (H.J. Res. 20) providing for congressional disapproval under chapter 8 of title 5, United States Code, of the rule submitted by the Department of Energy relating to "Energy Conservation Program: Energy Conservation Standards for Consumer Gas-fired Instantaneous Water Heaters"; providing for consideration of the joint resolution (H.J. Res. 35) providing for congressional disapproval under chapter 8 of title 5, United States Code, of the rule submitted by the Environmental Protection Agency relating to "Waste Emissions Charge for Petroleum and Natural Gas Systems: Procedures for Facilitating Compliance, Including Netting and Exemptions"; and providing for consideration of the concurrent resolution (H. Con. Res. 14) establishing the congressional budget for the United States Government for fiscal year 2025 and setting forth the appropriate budgetary levels for fiscal years 2026 through 2034.
H.Res. 162	February 25, 2025	Electing Members to certain standing committees of the House of Representatives.
H.Res. 177	March 3, 2025	Providing for consideration of the joint resolution (H.J. Res. 42) providing for congressional disapproval under chapter 8 of title 5, United States Code, of the rule submitted by the Department of Energy relating to "Energy Conservation Program for Appliance Standards: Certification Requirements, Labeling Requirements, and Enforcement Provisions for Certain Consumer Products and Commercial Equipment"; providing for consideration of the joint resolution (H.J. Res. 61) providing for congressional disapproval under chapter 8 of title 5, United States Code, of the rule submitted by the Environmental Protection Agency relating to "National Emission Standards for Hazardous Air Pollutants: Rubber Tire Manufacturing"; and providing for consideration of the joint resolution (S.J. Res. 11) providing for congressional disapproval under chapter 8 of title 5, United States Code, of the rule submitted by the Bureau of Ocean Energy Management relating to "Protection of Marine Archaeological Resources".
H.Res. 189	March 5, 2025	Censuring Representative Al Green of Texas.
H.Res. 190	March 5, 2025	Electing Members to the Joint Committee of Congress on the Library and the Joint Committee on Printing.
H.Res. 191	March 5, 2025	Expressing the profound sorrow of the House of Representatives on the death of the Honorable Sylvester Turner.
H.Res. 198	March 6, 2025	Providing for the expenses of certain committees of the House of Representatives in the One Hundred Nineteenth Congress.
H.Res. 211	March 11, 2025	Providing for consideration of the joint resolution (H.J. Res. 25) providing for congressional disapproval under chapter 8 of title 5, United States Code, of the rule submitted by the Internal Revenue Service relating to "Gross Proceeds Reporting by Brokers That Regularly Provide Services Effectuating Digital Asset Sales"; providing for consideration of the bill (H.R. 1156) to amend the CARES Act to extend the statute of limitations for fraud under certain unemployment programs, and for other purposes; providing for consideration of the bill (H.R. 1968) making further continuing appropriations and other extensions for the fiscal year ending September 30, 2025, and for other purposes; and for other purposes.
H.Res. 212	March 11, 2025	Returning Senate Joint Resolution 3 to the Senate.
H.Res. 213	March 11, 2025	Electing Members to a certain standing committee of the House of Representatives.
H.Res. 214	March 11, 2025	Electing Members to certain standing committees of the House of Representatives.
H.Res. 240	March 24, 2025	Expressing the profound sorrow of the House of Representatives on the death of the Honorable Raúl M. Grijalva.
H.Res. 242	March 24, 2025	Providing for consideration of the joint resolution (H.J.Res. 24) providing for congressional disapproval under chapter 8 of title 5, United States Code, of the rule submitted by the Department of Energy relating to "Energy Conservation Program: Energy Conservation Standards for Walk-In Coolers and Walk-In Freezers"; providing for consideration of the joint resolution (H.J.Res. 75) providing for congressional disapproval under chapter 8 of title 5, United States Code, of the rule submitted by the Office of Energy Efficiency and Renewable Energy, Department of Energy relating to "Energy Conservation Program: Energy Conservation Standards for Commercial Refrigerators, Freezers, and Refrigerator-Freezers"; and providing for consideration of the bill (H.R. 1048) to amend the Higher Education Act of 1965 to strengthen disclosure requirements relating to foreign gifts and contracts, to prohibit contracts between institutions of higher education and certain foreign entities and countries of concern, and for other purposes.
H.Res. 283	April 1, 2025	Electing a Member to a certain standing committee of the House of Representatives.
H.Res. 293	April 7, 2025	Providing for the announcement of pairs from a written list furnished to the Clerk, and for other purposes.
H.Res. 294	April 7, 2025	Providing for consideration of the joint resolution (S.J.Res. 18) disapproving the rule submitted by the Bureau of Consumer Financial Protection relating to "Overdraft Lending: Very Large Financial Institutions"; providing for consideration of the joint resolution (S.J.Res. 28) disapproving the rule submitted by the Bureau of Consumer Financial Protection relating to "Defining Larger Participants of a Market for General-Use Digital Consumer Payment Applications"; providing for consideration of the bill (H.R. 1526) to amend title 28, United States Code, to limit the authority of district courts to provide injunctive relief, and for other purposes; providing for consideration of the bill (H.R. 22) to amend the National Voter Registration Act of 1993 to require proof of United States citizenship to register an individual to vote in elections for Federal office, and for other purposes; and for other purposes.
H.Res. 300	April 8, 2025	Electing Members to certain standing committees of the House of Representatives.
H.Res. 313	April 9, 2025	Providing for consideration of the Senate amendment to the concurrent resolution (H. Con. Res. 14) establishing the congressional budget for the United States Government for fiscal year 2025 and setting forth the appropriate budgetary levels for fiscal years 2026 through 2034, and for other purposes.
H.Res. 352	April 24, 2025	Calling on elected officials and civil society leaders to counter antisemitism and educate the public on the contributions of the Jewish American community.
H.Res. 354	April 28, 2025	Providing for consideration of the joint resolution (H.J. Res. 60) providing for congressional disapproval under chapter 8 of title 5, United States Code, of the rule submitted by the National Park Service relating to "Glen Canyon National Recreation Area: Motor Vehicles"; providing for consideration of the joint resolution (H.J. Res. 78) providing for congressional disapproval under chapter 8 of title 5, United States Code, of the rule submitted by the United States Fish and Wildlife Service relating to "Endangered and Threatened Wildlife and Plants; Endangered Species Status for the San Francisco Bay-Delta Distinct Population Segment of the Longfin Smelt"; providing for consideration of the joint resolution (H.J. Res. 87) providing congressional disapproval under chapter 8 of title 5, United States Code, of the rule submitted by the Environmental Protection Agency relating to "California State Motor Vehicle and Engine Pollution Control Standards; Heavy-Duty Vehicle and Engine Emission Warranty and Maintenance Provisions; Advanced Clean Trucks; Zero Emission Airport Shuttle; Zero-Emission Power Train Certification; Waiver of Preemption; Notice of Decision"; providing for consideration of the joint resolution (H.J. Res. 88) providing congressional disapproval under chapter 8 of title 5, United States Code, of the rule submitted by the Environmental Protection Agency relating to "California State Motor Vehicle and Engine Pollution Control Standards; Advanced Clean Cars II; Waiver of Preemption; Notice of Decision"; providing for consideration of the joint resolution (H.J. Res. 89) providing congressional disapproval under chapter 8 of title 5, United States Code, of the rule submitted by the Environmental Protection Agency relating to "California State Motor Vehicle and Engine and Nonroad Engine Pollution Control Standards; The 'Omnibus' Low NOX Regulation; Waiver of Preemption; Notice of Decision"; and for other purposes.
H.Res. 364	April 28, 2025	Calling upon local communities to support organizations that provide resources and aid Gold Shield Families in their time of need.
H.Res. 377	May 5, 2025	Providing for consideration of the bill (H.R. 276) to rename the Gulf of Mexico as the "Gulf of America", and providing for consideration of the bill (H.R. 881) to establish Department of Homeland Security funding restrictions on institutions of higher education that have a relationship with Confucius Institutes, and for other purposes.
H.Res. 405	May 13, 2025	Providing for consideration of the bill (H.R. 2240) to require the Attorney General to develop reports relating to violent attacks against law enforcement officers, and for other purposes; providing for consideration of the bill (H.R. 2243) to amend title 18, United States Code, to improve the Law Enforcement Officer Safety Act and provisions relating to the carrying of concealed weapons by law enforcement officers, and for other purposes; and providing for consideration of the bill (H.R. 2255) to allow Federal law enforcement officers to purchase retired service weapons, and for other purposes.
H.Res. 426	May 19, 2025	Providing for consideration of the joint resolution (S.J. Res. 13) providing for congressional disapproval under chapter 8 of title 5, United States Code, of the rule submitted by the Office of the Comptroller of the Currency of the Department of the Treasury relating to the review of applications under the Bank Merger Act; providing for consideration of the joint resolution (S.J. Res. 31) providing for congressional disapproval under chapter 8 of title 5, United States Code, of the rule submitted by the Environmental Protection Agency relating to "Review of Final Rule Reclassification of Major Sources as Area Sources Under Section 112 of the Clean Air Act"; and waiving a requirement of clause 6(a) of rule XIII with respect to consideration of certain resolutions reported from the Committee on Rules.
H.Res. 430	May 20, 2025	Electing Members to certain standing committees of the House of Representatives.
H.Res. 435	May 21, 2025	Expressing the profound sorrow of the House of Representatives on the death of the Honorable Gerald E. Connolly.
H.Res. 436	May 21, 2025	Providing for consideration of the bill (H.R. 1) to provide for reconciliation pursuant to title II of H. Con. Res. 14.
H.Res. 458	June 3, 2025	Providing for consideration of the bill (H.R. 2483) to reauthorize certain programs that provide for opioid use disorder prevention, treatment, and recovery, and for other purposes; providing for consideration of the bill (H.R. 2931) to direct the Administrator of the Small Business Administration to relocate certain offices of the Small Business Administration in sanctuary jurisdictions, and for other purposes; providing for consideration of the bill (H.R. 2966) to require the Administrator of the Small Business Administration to require an applicant for certain loans of the Administration to provide certain citizenship status documentation, and for other purposes; and providing for consideration of the bill (H.R. 2987) to amend the Small Business Act to require a limit on the number of small business lending companies, and for other purposes.
H.Res. 469	June 4, 2025	Permitting official photographs of the House of Representatives to be taken while the House is in actual session on a date designated by the Speaker.
H.Res. 480	June 5, 2025	Requiring each Member, officer, and employee of the House of Representatives to complete a program of training in workplace rights and responsibilities each session of each Congress, and for other purposes.
H.Res. 481	June 5, 2025	Condemning the rise in ideologically motivated attacks on Jewish individuals in the United States, including the recent violent assault in Boulder, Colorado, and reaffirming the House of Representatives commitment to combating antisemitism and politically motivated violence.
H.Res. 488	June 9, 2025	Denouncing the antisemitic terrorist attack in Boulder, Colorado.
H.Res. 489	June 9, 2025	Providing for consideration of the bill (H.R. 884) to prohibit individuals who are not citizens of the United States from voting in elections in the District of Columbia and to repeal the Local Resident Voting Rights Amendment Act of 2022; providing for consideration of the bill (H.R. 2056) to require the District of Columbia to comply with federal immigration laws; providing for consideration of the bill (H.R. 2096) to restore the right to negotiate matters pertaining to the discipline of law enforcement officers of the District of Columbia through collective bargaining, to restore the statute of limitations for bringing disciplinary cases against members or civilian employees of the Metropolitan Police Department of the District of Columbia, and for other purposes; and providing for consideration of the bill (S. 331) to amend the Controlled Substances Act with respect to the scheduling of fentanyl-related substances, and for other purposes.
H.Res. 492	June 10, 2025	Directing the Clerk of the House of Representatives to make a correction in the engrossment of H.R. 1.
H.Res. 499	June 11, 2025	Providing for consideration of the bill (H.R. 4) to rescind certain budget authority proposed to be rescinded in special messages transmitted to the Congress by the President on June 3, 2025, in accordance with section 1012(a) of the Congressional Budget and Impoundment Control Act of 1974, and for other purposes.
H.Res. 516	June 17, 2025	Condemning the violent June 2025 riots in Los Angeles, California.
H.Res. 519	June 17, 2025	Condemning the attacks on Minnesota lawmakers in Brooklyn Park and Champlin, Minnesota, and calling for unity and the rejection of political violence in Minnesota and across the United States.
H.Res. 530	June 23, 2025	Providing for consideration of the bill (H.R. 3944) making appropriations for military construction, the Department of Veterans Affairs, and related agencies for the fiscal year ending September 30, 2026, and for other purposes; providing for consideration of the bill (H.R. 275) to require the Secretary of Homeland Security to publish on a monthly basis the number of special interest aliens encountered attempting to unlawfully enter the United States, and for other purposes; providing for consideration of the bill (H.R. 875) to amend the Immigration and Nationality Act to provide that aliens who have been convicted of or who have committed an offense for driving while intoxicated or impaired are inadmissible and deportable; and providing for consideration of the resolution (H. Res. 516) condemning the violent June 2025 riots in Los Angeles, California.
H.Res. 538	June 24, 2025	Ranking a Certain Member on a certain standing committee of the House of Representatives.
H.Res. 566	July 2, 2025	Providing for consideration of the Senate amendment to the bill (H.R. 1) to provide for reconciliation pursuant to title II of H. Con. Res. 14.
H.Res. 580	July 15, 2025	Providing for consideration of the bill (H.R. 4016) making appropriations for the Department of Defense for the fiscal year ending September 30, 2026, and for other purposes; providing for consideration of the bill (H.R. 3633) to provide for a system of regulation of the offer and sale of digital commodities by the Securities and Exchange Commission and the Commodity Futures Trading Commission, and for other purposes; providing for consideration of the bill (H.R. 1919) to amend the Federal Reserve Act to prohibit the Federal reserve banks from offering certain products or services directly to an individual, to prohibit the use of central bank digital currency for monetary policy, and for other purposes; providing for consideration of the bill (S. 1582) to provide for the regulation of payment stablecoins, and for other purposes; and waiving a requirement of clause 6(a) of rule XIII with respect to consideration of certain resolutions reported from the Committee on Rules.
H.Res. 590	July 17, 2025	Relating to consideration of the Senate amendment to the bill (H.R. 4) to rescind certain budget authority proposed to be rescinded in special messages transmitted to the Congress by the President on June 3, 2025, in accordance with section 1012(a) of the Congressional Budget and Impoundment Control Act of 1974.
H.Res. 600	July 22, 2025	Electing Members to certain standing committees of the House of Representatives.
H.Res. 605	July 23, 2025	Establishing the Select Subcommittee to Investigate the Remaining Questions Surrounding January 6, 2021.
H.Res. 668	September 2, 2025	Directing the Committee on Oversight and Government Reform to continue its ongoing investigation into the possible mismanagement of the Federal government's investigation of Mr. Jeffrey Epstein and Ms. Ghislaine Maxwell, and for other purposes.
H.Res. 672	September 3, 2025	Providing for consideration of the bill (H.R. 4553) making appropriations for energy and water development and related agencies for the fiscal year ending September 30, 2026, and for other purposes; providing for consideration of the joint resolution (H.J. Res. 104) providing for congressional disapproval under chapter 8 of title 5, United States Code, of the rule submitted by the Bureau of Land Management relating to Miles City Field Office Record of Decision and Approved Resource Management Plan Amendment; providing for consideration of the joint resolution (H.J. Res. 105) providing for congressional disapproval under chapter 8 of title 5, United States Code, of the rule submitted by the Bureau of Land Management relating to North Dakota Field Office Record of Decision and Approved Resource Management Plan; providing for consideration of the joint resolution (H.J. Res. 106) providing for congressional disapproval under chapter 8 of title 5, United States Code, of the rule submitted by the Bureau of Land Management relating to Central Yukon Record of Decision and Approved Resource Management Plan; and for other purposes.
H.Res. 682	September 9, 2025	Providing for consideration of the bill (H.R. 3838) to authorize appropriations for fiscal year 2026 for military activities of the Department of Defense, for military construction, and for defense activities of the Department of Energy, to prescribe military personnel strengths for such fiscal year, and for other purposes, and providing for consideration of the bill (H.R. 3486) to amend the Immigration and Nationality Act to increase penalties for individuals who illegally enter and reenter the United States after being removed, and for other purposes.
H.Res. 707	September 15, 2025	Providing for consideration of the bill (H.R. 4922) to limit youth offender status in the District of Columbia to individuals 18 years of age or younger, to direct the Attorney General of the District of Columbia to establish and operate a publicly accessible website containing updated statistics on juvenile crime in the District of Columbia, to amend the District of Columbia Home Rule Act to prohibit the Council of the District of Columbia from enacting changes to existing criminal liability sentences, and for other purposes; providing for consideration of the bill (H.R. 5143) to establish standards for law enforcement officers in the District of Columbia to engage in vehicular pursuits of suspects, and for other purposes; providing for consideration of the bill (H.R. 5140) to lower the age at which a minor may be tried as an adult for certain criminal offenses in the District of Columbia to 14 years of age; providing for consideration of the bill (H.R. 5125) to amend the District of Columbia Home Rule Act to terminate the District of Columbia Judicial Nomination Commission, and for other purposes; providing for consideration of the bill (H.R. 1047) to require the Federal Energy Regulatory Commission to reform the interconnection queue process for the prioritization and approval of certain projects, and for other purposes; providing for consideration of the bill (H.R. 3015) to reestablish the National Coal Council in the Department of Energy to provide advice and recommendations to the Secretary of Energy on matters related to coal and the coal industry, and for other purposes; providing for consideration of the bill (H.R. 3062) to establish a more uniform, transparent, and modern process to authorize the construction, connection, operation, and maintenance of international border-crossing facilities for the import and export of oil and natural gas and the transmission of electricity; and for other purposes.
H.Res. 719	September 16, 2025	Honoring the life and legacy of Charles "Charlie" James Kirk.
H.Res. 721	September 16, 2025	Electing Members to certain standing committees of the House of Representatives.
H.Res. 722	September 16, 2025	Providing for consideration of the bill (H.R. 5371) making continuing appropriations and extensions for fiscal year 2026, and for other purposes; providing for consideration of the resolution (H. Res. 719) honoring the life and legacy of Charles "Charlie" James Kirk; and for other purposes.
H.Res. 747	September 19, 2025	Directing the Clerk of the House of Representatives to request the Senate to return to the House the bill (H.R. 3426) entitled "To amend title 40, United States Code, to limit the construction of new courthouses under certain circumstances, and for other purposes.".
H.Res. 782	September 30, 2025	Expressing condolences and support for the victims of the July 4 flooding in Texas, honoring acts of heroism, and committing to stand with those impacted by these floods.
H.Res. 873	November 12, 2025	Providing for consideration of the Senate amendment to the bill (H.R. 5371) making continuing appropriations and extensions for fiscal year 2026, and for other purposes.
H.Res. 874	November 12, 2025	Expressing the profound sorrow of the House of Representatives on the death of the Honorable Richard B. Cheney.
H.Res. 878	November 17, 2025	Disapproving the behavior of Representative Jesús G. "Chuy" García of Illinois.
H.Res. 879	November 17, 2025	Providing for consideration of the joint resolution (S.J. Res. 80) providing for congressional disapproval under chapter 8 of title 5, United States Code, of the rule submitted by the Bureau of Land Management relating to National Petroleum Reserve in Alaska Integrated Activity Plan Record of Decision; providing for consideration of the joint resolution (H.J. Res. 130) providing for congressional disapproval under chapter 8 of title 5, United States Code, of the rule submitted by the Bureau of Land Management relating to Buffalo Field Office Record of Decision and Approved Resource Management Plan Amendment; providing for consideration of the joint resolution (H.J. Res. 131) providing for congressional disapproval under chapter 8 of title 5, United States Code, of the rule submitted by the Bureau of Land Management relating to Coastal Plain Oil and Gas Leasing Program Record of Decision; providing for consideration of the concurrent resolution (H. Con. Res. 58) denouncing the horrors of socialism; providing for consideration of the bill (H.R. 1949) to repeal restrictions on the export and import of natural gas; providing for consideration of the bill (H.R. 3109) to require the Secretary of Energy to direct the National Petroleum Council to issue a report with respect to petrochemical refineries in the United States, and for other purposes; providing for consideration of the bill (H.R. 5107) to repeal the Comprehensive Policing and Justice Reform Amendment Act of 2022 enacted by the District of Columbia Council; providing for consideration of the bill (H.R. 5214) to require mandatory pretrial and post conviction detention for crimes of violence and dangerous crimes and require mandatory cash bail for certain offenses that pose a threat to public safety or order in the District of Columbia, and for other purposes; and for other purposes.
H.Res. 886	November 18, 2025	Electing a member to a certain standing committee of the House of Representatives.
H.Res. 887	November 18, 2025	Electing a member to a certain standing committee of the House of Representatives.
H.Res. 1009	January 20, 2026	Providing for consideration of the bill (H.R. 6945) to amend part A of title IV of the Social Security Act to clarify the authority of States to use funds for pregnancy centers; providing for consideration of the bill (H.R. 6359) to require institutions of higher education to disseminate information on the rights of, and accommodations and resources for, pregnant students; and providing for consideration of the joint resolution (H.J. Res. 140) providing for congressional disapproval under chapter 8 of title 5, United States Code, of the rule submitted by the Bureau of Land Management relating to Public Land Order No. 7917 for withdrawal of Federal lands in Minnesota.
H.Res. 1014	January 22, 2026	Providing for consideration of the bill (H.R. 7148) making further consolidated appropriations for fiscal year 2026; providing for consideration of the bill (H.R. 7147) making further consolidated appropriations for fiscal year 2026.
H.Res. 1016	January 22, 2026	Directing the Clerk of the House of Representatives to make a correction in the engrossment of (H.R. 7147).
H.Res. 1032	February 3, 2026	Providing for consideration of the Senate amendments to (H.R. 7148) making consolidated appropriations for fiscal year 2026; providing for consideration of (H.J. Res. 142) disapproving the action of the District of Columbia Council; and providing for consideration of (H.R. 4090) relating to domestic mining and hardrock mineral resources.
H.Res. 1048	February 10, 2026	Electing a Member to a certain standing committee of the House of Representatives.
H.Res. 1057	February 11, 2026	Providing for consideration of (S. 1383) establishing the Veterans Advisory Committee on Equal Access; providing for consideration of (H.R. 2189) modernizing Federal firearms laws; providing for consideration of (H.R. 261) relating to undersea fiber optic cables; providing for consideration of (H.R. 3617) securing critical energy resources; and waiving procedural requirements under House rules.
H.Res. 1075	February 24, 2026	Providing for consideration of (H.R. 4626) amending the Energy Policy and Conservation Act; and providing for consideration of (H.R. 4758) repealing provisions of Public Law 117-169 relating to home electrification subsidies.
H.Res. 1095	March 3, 2026	Providing for consideration of (H.R. 7744) making appropriations for the Department of Homeland Security for fiscal year 2026.
H.Res. 1099	March 4, 2026	Reaffirming that Iran remains the largest state sponsor of terrorism.
H.Res. 1115	March 16, 2026	Providing for consideration of (H.R. 556) relating to lead ammunition and tackle; providing for consideration of (H.R. 1958) amending the Immigration and Nationality Act; providing for consideration of (H.R. 4638) relating to animal cruelty offenses and deportability; and relating to suspension of the rules.
H.Res. 1128	March 20, 2026	Expressing the support of the House of Representatives for the United States Department of Homeland Security.
H.Res. 1131	March 24, 2026	Providing for consideration of (H.R. 8029) making appropriations for the United States Department of Homeland Security; providing for consideration of (H. Res. 1128); providing for consideration of (H.R. 5103) establishing a District of Columbia beautification program; and providing for consideration of (H.R. 7084) relating to vessel operations in U.S. waters.
H.Res. 1135	March 25, 2026	Electing Members to certain standing committees of the House of Representatives.
H.Res. 1140	March 26, 2026	Providing for consideration of (H.R. 5408) to accelerate workplace time-to-contract under the National Labor Relations Act.
H.Res. 1142	March 27, 2026	Providing for disposition of the Senate amendment to (H.R. 7147) making consolidated appropriations for fiscal year 2026.
H.Res. 1156	April 9, 2026	Expressing support for tax policies that support working families.
H.Res. 1174	April 15, 2026	Providing for consideration of H.R. 6387, H.R. 6398, and H.R. 6409, all relating to amendments to the Clean Air Act, and providing for consideration of H.Res. 1156 expressing support for tax policies that support working families.
H.Res. 1182	April 16, 2026	Expressing support for rural communities across the United States as stewards of the environment, major suppliers of energy resources, providers of food production and manufacturing capacity, and drivers of national economic stability.
H.Res. 1189	April 20, 2026	Providing for consideration of H.R. 4690 regarding Federal building energy efficiency standards; H.Res. 1182 supporting rural communities; H.R. 1897 to amend the Endangered Species Act of 1973; and H.R. 5587 to amend the Geothermal Steam Act of 1970.
H.Res. 1206	April 22, 2026	Expressing the profound sorrow of the House of Representatives on the death of the Honorable David Scott.
H.Res. 1224	April 29, 2026	Providing for consideration of H.R. 7567, the farm bill; H.R. 2616 regarding parental consent for changes to a minor's gender markers in schools; S.Con.Res. 33, the congressional budget resolution; S. 1318 regarding identification of American-Jewish servicemembers buried overseas under incorrect religious markers; H.R. 1346 regarding the Clean Air Act ethanol waiver; and for other purposes.
H.Res. 1251	April 30, 2026	Calling on elected officials and civil society leaders to counter antisemitism and educate the public on the contributions of the Jewish-American community.
H.Res. 1252	May 4, 2026	A resolution memorializing law enforcement officers killed in the line of duty.
H.Res. 1259	May 7, 2026	Expressing the sense of the House that the President of the United States should prioritize securing the release of Pastor Jin Mingri, Pastor Gao Quanfu, Pang Yu, Gulshan Abbas, and Jimmy Lai, who are detained by the People's Republic of China, during future engagements with Chinese President Xi Jinping.
H.Res. 1274	May 12, 2026	Providing that section 11 of H.Res. 1224 shall have no force or effect.
H.Res. 1275	May 12, 2026	Providing for consideration of H.R. 5625 on cashless bail transparency; H.R. 6260 on fraud in connection with posting bail; H.R. 8365 regarding court-appointed monitors; H.Con.Res. 96 expressing support for law enforcement officers; and H.R. 8469, making appropriations for military construction, the United States Department of Veterans Affairs, and related agencies for fiscal year 2027.
H.Res. 1299	May 19, 2026	Providing for the concurrence by the United States House of Representatives in the United States Senate amendment to H.R. 6644, with amendment.
H.Res. 1300	May 19, 2026	Providing for consideration of H.R. 1041, to prohibit the United States Department of Veterans Affairs from transmitting certain information to the United States Department of Justice for use by the National Instant Criminal Background Check System; providing for consideration of H.R. 6047, to increase certain veterans' disability compensation; providing for consideration of H.R. 1329, to permit the Smithsonian American Women's History Museum to be located within the National Mall Reserve; and waiving certain procedural requirements for consideration of resolutions reported from the United States House Committee on Rules.

== Introduced in the Senate ==
=== Passed by both houses, signed by President ===
S. number	Date of introduction	Short title	Long title	Description
S.J.Res. 11	February 4, 2025	(No short title)	A joint resolution providing for congressional disapproval under chapter 8 of title 5, United States Code, of the rule submitted by the Bureau of Ocean Energy Management relating to "Protection of Marine Archaeological Resources".	
S.J.Res. 18	February 13, 2025	(No short title)	A joint resolution disapproving the rule submitted by the Bureau of Consumer Financial Protection relating to "Overdraft Lending: Very Large Financial Institutions".	
S.J.Res. 28	February 27, 2025	(No short title)	A joint resolution disapproving the rule submitted by the Bureau of Consumer Financial Protection relating to "Defining Larger Participants of a Market for General-Use Digital Consumer Payment Applications".	
S. 5	January 6, 2025	Laken Riley Act	To require the Secretary of Homeland Security to take into custody aliens who have been charged in the United States with theft, and for other purposes.	
S. 146	January 16, 2025	TAKE IT DOWN Act	To require covered platforms to remove nonconsensual intimate visual depictions, and for other purposes.	
S. 160	January 21, 2025	Aerial Firefighting Enhancement Act of 2025	To amend the Wildfire Suppression Aircraft Transfer Act of 1996 to reauthorize the sale by the Department of Defense of aircraft and parts for wildfire suppression purposes, and for other purposes.	
S. 201	January 23, 2025	ACES Act of 2025	To provide for a study by the National Academies of Sciences, Engineering, and Medicine on the prevalence and mortality of cancer among individuals who served as active duty aircrew in the Armed Forces, and for other purposes.	
S. 331	January 30, 2025	Halt All Lethal Trafficking of Fentanyl Act	A bill to amend the Controlled Substances Act with respect to the scheduling of fentanyl-related substances, and for other purposes.	
S. 423	February 5, 2025	PRO Veterans Act of 2025	To protect regular order for budgeting for the Department of Veterans Affairs, and for other purposes.	
S. 1582	May 1, 2025	GENIUS Act	To provide for the regulation of payment stablecoins, and for other purposes.	
S. 1596	May 5, 2025	Jocelyn Nungaray National Wildlife Refuge Act	To rename the Anahuac National Wildlife Refuge located in Anahuac, Texas, as the Jocelyn Nungaray National Wildlife Refuge.	
S. 2283	July 15, 2025	Oscar J. Upham Post Office	To designate the facility of the United States Postal Service located at 201 West Oklahoma Avenue in Guthrie, Oklahoma, as the Oscar J. Upham Post Office.	

=== Passed by the Senate, waiting in the House ===
S. number	Date of introduction	Short title	Long title	Description
S.J.Res. 3	January 21, 2025	(No short title)	A joint resolution providing for congressional disapproval under chapter 8 of title 5, United States Code, of the rule submitted by the Internal Revenue Service relating to "Gross Proceeds Reporting by Brokers That Regularly Provide Services Effectuating Digital Asset Sales".	Practically rejected by the House pursuant to H.Res. 212.
S.J.Res. 37	March 11, 2025	(No short title)	A joint resolution terminating the national emergency declared to impose duties on articles imported from Canada.	
S.Con.Res. 7	February 13, 2025	(No short title)	An original concurrent resolution setting forth the congressional budget for the United States Government for fiscal year 2025 and setting forth the appropriate budgetary levels for fiscal years 2026 through 2034.	
S. 32	January 8, 2025	Local Access to Courts Act	To clarify where court may be held for certain district courts in Texas and California.	
S. 129	January 16, 2025	No Tax on Tips Act	A bill to amend the Internal Revenue Code of 1986 to eliminate the application of the income tax on qualified tips through a deduction allowed to all individual taxpayers.	Establishes a new tax deduction of up to $25,000 for tips
S. 524	February 11, 2025	Coast Guard Authorization Act of 2025	To authorize appropriations for the Coast Guard, and for other purposes.	
S. 960	March 11, 2025	Justice for Murder Victims Act	To ensure that homicides can be prosecuted under Federal law without regard to the time elapsed between the act or omission that caused the death of the victim and the death itself.	
S. 1077	March 14, 2025	District of Columbia Local Funds Act, 2025	To approve local funds for the District of Columbia for fiscal year 2025, in accordance with the Fiscal Year 2025 Local Budget Act of 2024, and to establish provisions for the use of such funds.	

=== Passed by both houses, no presidential consent needed ===
S. number	Date of introduction	Long title	Description
S.Con.Res. 1	January 3, 2025	A concurrent resolution extending the life of the Joint Congressional Committee on Inaugural Ceremonies.	
S.Con.Res. 2	January 3, 2025	A concurrent resolution to provide for the counting on January 6, 2025, of the electoral votes for President and Vice President of the United States.	
S.Con.Res. 3	January 3, 2025	A concurrent resolution authorizing the use of the rotunda of the Capitol for the lying in state of the remains of the late James Earl Carter, Jr., 39th President of the United States.	

=== Passed by the Senate, no House consent needed ===
S. number	Date of introduction	Long title
S.Res. 1	January 3, 2025	A resolution establishing a Committee to Inform the President of the United States that a quorum of each House is assembled.
S.Res. 2	January 3, 2025	A resolution informing the House of Representatives that a quorum of the Senate is assembled.
S.Res. 3	January 3, 2025	A resolution to elect Charles E. Grassley, a Senator from the State of Iowa, to be President pro tempore of the Senate of the United States.
S.Res. 4	January 3, 2025	A resolution notifying the President of the United States of the election of a President pro tempore.
S.Res. 5	January 3, 2025	A resolution notifying the House of Representatives of the election of a President pro tempore.
S.Res. 6	January 3, 2025	A resolution expressing the thanks of the Senate to the Honorable Patty Murray for her service as President Pro Tempore of the United States Senate and to designate Senator Murray as President Pro Tempore Emerita of the United States Senate.
S.Res. 7	January 3, 2025	A resolution fixing the hour of daily meeting of the Senate.
S.Res. 8	January 3, 2025	A resolution electing Jackie Barber as Secretary of the Senate.
S.Res. 9	January 3, 2025	A resolution notifying the President of the United States of the election of a Secretary of the Senate.
S.Res. 10	January 3, 2025	A resolution notifying the House of Representatives of the election of a Secretary of the Senate.
S.Res. 11	January 3, 2025	A resolution electing Jennifer A. Hemingway as Sergeant at Arms and Doorkeeper of the Senate.
S.Res. 12	January 3, 2025	A resolution notifying the President of the United States of the election of a Sergeant at Arms and Doorkeeper of the Senate.
S.Res. 13	January 3, 2025	A resolution notifying the House of Representatives of the election of a Sergeant at Arms and Doorkeeper of the Senate.
S.Res. 14	January 3, 2025	A resolution electing Robert M. Duncan, of the District of Columbia, as Secretary for the Majority of the Senate.
S.Res. 15	January 3, 2025	A resolution electing Gary B. Myrick, of Virginia, as Secretary for the Minority of the Senate.
S.Res. 16	January 7, 2025	A resolution to constitute the majority party's membership on certain committees for the One Hundred Nineteenth Congress, or until their successors are chosen.
S.Res. 17	January 7, 2025	A resolution to constitute the minority party's membership on certain committees for the One Hundred Nineteenth Congress, or until their successors are chosen.
S.Res. 19	January 9, 2025	A resolution honoring the life and legacy of President Jimmy Carter and commending President Jimmy Carter for his life-long career of public service, humanitarian leadership, diplomacy, and courageous advocacy.
S.Res. 26	January 14, 2025	A resolution to constitute the majority party's membership on certain committees for the One Hundred Nineteenth Congress, or until their successors are chosen.
S.Res. 27	January 15, 2025	A resolution congratulating the North Dakota State University Bison football team for winning the 2024 National Collegiate Athletic Association Division I Football Championship Subdivision title.
S.Res. 34	January 23, 2025	A resolution congratulating the Washington University in St. Louis Bears women's soccer team for winning the 2024 NCAA Division III Women's Soccer Championship.
S.Res. 38	January 24, 2025	A resolution to constitute the majority party's membership on certain committees for the One Hundred Nineteenth Congress, or until their successors are chosen.
S.Res. 39	January 27, 2025	A resolution supporting the observation of National Trafficking and Modern Slavery Prevention Month during the period beginning on January 1, 2025, and ending on February 1, 2025, to raise awareness of, and opposition to, human trafficking and modern slavery.
S.Res. 40	January 27, 2025	A resolution commemorating the 80th anniversary of the liberation of the Auschwitz extermination camp in Nazi-occupied Poland and International Holocaust Remembrance Day.
S.Res. 41	January 27, 2025	A resolution authorizing the Sergeant at Arms and Doorkeeper of the Senate to conduct quarterly blood donation drives during the 119th Congress.
S.Res. 45	January 29, 2025	A resolution supporting the contributions of Catholic schools in the United States and celebrating the 51st annual National Catholic Schools Week.
S.Res. 46	January 29, 2025	A resolution raising awareness and encouraging the prevention of stalking by designating January 2025 as "National Stalking Awareness Month".
S.Res. 48	January 30, 2025	A resolution congratulating the Ohio State University football team for winning the 2025 College Football Playoff National Championship.
S.Res. 49	January 30, 2025	A resolution designating the week beginning February 3, 2025, as "National Tribal Colleges and Universities Week".
S.Res. 50	January 30, 2025	A resolution designating the week of February 3 through 7, 2025, as "National School Counseling Week".
S.Res. 53	February 4, 2025	A resolution recognizing the 80th anniversary of the amphibious landing on the Japanese island of Iwo Jima during World War II and the raisings of the flag of the United States on Mount Suribachi.
S.Res. 55	February 4, 2025	A resolution recognizing January 2025 as "National Mentoring Month".
S.Res. 56	February 4, 2025	A resolution congratulating the University of Vermont men's soccer team on winning the 2024 National Collegiate Athletic Association Division I men's soccer national championship.
S.Res. 64	February 6, 2025	A resolution honoring the memory of the victims of the tragic mid-air collision between American Airlines Flight 5342 and United States Army Aviation Brigade Priority Air Transport 25 on January 29, 2025.
S.Res. 66	February 6, 2025	A resolution supporting the goals and ideals of "Career and Technical Education Month".
S.Res. 72	February 11, 2025	A resolution affirming that Hamas cannot retain any political or military control in the Gaza Strip.
S.Res. 79	February 13, 2025	A resolution honoring the memories of the victims of the senseless attack at Marjory Stoneman Douglas High School on February 14, 2018.
S.Res. 80	February 13, 2025	A resolution expressing gratitude to the Joint Congressional Committee on Inaugural Ceremonies, the Architect of the Capitol, the Sergeant at Arms, the Secretary of the Senate, law enforcement officers, emergency personnel, and volunteers for their support in making the Presidential Inauguration a success.
S.Res. 84	February 19, 2025	A resolution congratulating the Philadelphia Eagles on their victory in Super Bowl LIX in the successful 105th season of the National Football League.
S.Res. 85	February 19, 2025	A resolution congratulating the Jackson State University Tigers for winning the 2024 Celebration Bowl.
S.Res. 87	February 21, 2025	A resolution designating February 2025 as "American Heart Month".
S.Res. 88	February 21, 2025	A resolution designating March 7, 2025, as "National Speech and Debate Education Day".
S.Res. 89	February 21, 2025	A resolution expressing support for the designation of February 15 through February 22, 2025, as "National FFA Week", recognizing the important role of the National FFA Organization in developing the next generation of leaders who will change the world, and celebrating the 90th anniversary of New Farmers of America and the 75th anniversary of the Future Farmers of America Federal charter.
S.Res. 92	February 24, 2025	A resolution designating February 16, 2025, as "National Elizabeth Peratrovich Day".
S.Res. 94	February 25, 2025	An original resolution authorizing expenditures by committees of the Senate for the periods March 1, 2025, through September 30, 2025, October 1, 2025, through September 30, 2026, and October 1, 2026, through February 28, 2027.
S.Res. 96	February 25, 2025	A resolution designating the week of February 24 through February 28, 2025, as "Public Schools Week".
S.Res. 97	February 25, 2025	A resolution honoring the life of Nebraska community leader Howard L. Hawks.
S.Res. 99	February 26, 2025	A resolution celebrating Black History Month.
S.Res. 104	February 27, 2025	A resolution designating February 27, 2025, as "Rare Disease Day".
S.Res. 115	March 5, 2025	A resolution relating to the death of the Honorable David Lyle Boren, former Senator for the State of Oklahoma.
S.Res. 117	March 6, 2025	A resolution providing for members on the part of the Senate of the Joint Committee on Printing and the Joint Committee of Congress on the Library.
S.Res. 118	March 6, 2025	A resolution designating March 6, 2025, as "National Slam the Scam Day" to raise awareness about pervasive scams and to promote education to prevent government imposter scams and other types of scams.
S.Res. 120	March 10, 2025	A resolution recognizing Girl Scouts of the United States of America on its 113th birthday and celebrating its founder, Juliette Gordon Low, and the legacy of providing girls with a secure and inclusive space where they can explore their world, build meaningful relationships, and have access to experiences that prepare them for a life of leadership.
S.Res. 129	March 14, 2025	A resolution recognizing and honoring teachers who have earned or maintained National Board Certification.
S.Res. 130	March 14, 2025	A resolution honoring the life and legacy of Dr. Mary Edwards Walker.
S.Res. 131	March 14, 2025	A resolution designating the third week of March 2025 as "National CACFP Week".
S.Res. 134	March 24, 2025	A resolution designating March 15, 2025, as "National Osceola Turkey Day".
S.Res. 138	March 25, 2025	A resolution supporting the goals and ideals of "Deep Vein Thrombosis and Pulmonary Embolism Awareness Month".
S.Res. 140	March 26, 2025	A resolution designating the first week of April 2025 as "National Asbestos Awareness Week".
S.Res. 141	March 26, 2025	A resolution recognizing the 204th anniversary of the independence of Greece and celebrating democracy in Greece and the United States.
S.Res. 142	March 26, 2025	A resolution recognizing the heritage, culture, and contributions of American Indian, Alaska Native, and Native Hawaiian women in the United States.
S.Res. 148	March 27, 2025	A resolution honoring the life of the Honorable Alan K. Simpson, former Senator for the State of Wyoming.
S.Res. 153	April 1, 2025	A resolution designating March 27, 2025, as "National Women in Agriculture Day".
S.Res. 155	April 5, 2025	A resolution honoring the life and legacy of the Honorable Mia Bourdeau Love, former Representative for the State of Utah.
S.Res. 156	April 5, 2025	A resolution commemorating the 50th anniversary of the Indian Self-Determination and Education Assistance Act.
S.Res. 157	April 5, 2025	A resolution designating April 2025 as "National Native Plant Month".
S.Res. 159	April 7, 2025	A resolution honoring the life of the Honorable John Bennett Johnston, Jr., former Senator for the State of Louisiana.
S.Res. 160	April 7, 2025	A resolution supporting the goals and ideals of National Safe Digging Month.
S.Res. 170	April 10, 2025	A resolution to authorize representation by the Senate Legal Counsel in the case of Desmond Bellard v. Ronald Wyden, U.S. Senator.
S.Res. 174	April 10, 2025	A resolution commemorating the 30th anniversary of the attack on the Alfred P. Murrah Federal Building.
S.Res. 175	April 10, 2025	A resolution recognizing April 14, 2025, as "World Quantum Day", and commemorating and supporting the goals of World Quantum Day.
S.Res. 176	April 10, 2025	A resolution designating April 5, 2025, as "Gold Star Wives Day".
S.Res. 177	April 10, 2025	A resolution recognizing the 200th anniversary of the incorporation of the city of Vicksburg, Mississippi, and the historical significance of the city.
S.Res. 178	April 10, 2025	A resolution honoring the life and legacy of the late George Foreman.
S.Res. 179	April 10, 2025	A resolution recognizing and supporting the goals and ideals of National Sexual Assault Awareness and Prevention Month.
S.Res. 180	April 10, 2025	A resolution designating the week of April 19 through April 27, 2025, as "National Park Week".
S.Res. 184	April 29, 2025	A resolution expressing support for the designation of April 2025 as "National Child Abuse Prevention Month", and the goals and ideals of National Child Abuse Prevention Month.
S.Res. 185	April 29, 2025	A resolution designating the week of April 21 through April 25, 2025, as "National Home Visiting Week".
S.Res. 186	April 29, 2025	A resolution supporting the mission and goals of National Fentanyl Awareness Day in 2025, including increasing individual and public awareness of the impact of fake or counterfeit fentanyl pills on families and young people.
S.Res. 187	April 29, 2025	A resolution celebrating the 153rd anniversary of Arbor Day.
S.Res. 188	April 30, 2025	A resolution recognizing April 4, 2025, as the International Day for Mine Awareness and Assistance in Mine Action, and reaffirming the leadership of the United States in eliminating landmines and unexploded ordnance.
S.Res. 189	April 30, 2025	A resolution expressing support for the designation of April 1, 2025, through April 30, 2025, as "Fair Chance Jobs Month".
S.Res. 190	April 30, 2025	A resolution seeking justice for the Japanese citizens abducted by North Korea.
S.Res. 191	April 30, 2025	A resolution supporting the designation of April 2025 as the "Month of the Military Child".
S.Res. 192	April 30, 2025	A resolution designating April 30, 2025, as "National Assistive Technology Awareness Day".
S.Res. 193	April 30, 2025	A resolution designating April 2025 as "Financial Literacy Month".
S.Res. 194	April 30, 2025	A resolution expressing support for the designation of the month of April 2025 as "Parkinson's Awareness Month".
S.Res. 195	May 1, 2025	A resolution requesting information on El Salvador's human rights practices pursuant to section 502B(c) of the Foreign Assistance Act of 1961.
S.Res. 196	May 1, 2025	A resolution congratulating the University of Oklahoma women's gymnastics team for winning the 2025 National Collegiate Athletic Association Championship, the seventh national title in program history.
S.Res. 197	May 1, 2025	A resolution commending and congratulating the University of Connecticut's women's basketball team for winning the 2025 National Collegiate Athletic Association Division I Women's Basketball National Championship.
S.Res. 198	May 1, 2025	A resolution expressing the sense of the Senate that the Secretary of Health and Human Services should withdraw a reduction in public notice and comment opportunities.
S.Res. 199	May 1, 2025	A resolution expressing support and appreciation for the efforts of the Republic of Romania and the Republic of Moldova to defend democracy and combat malign Russian interference.
S.Res. 200	May 5, 2025	A resolution expressing support for the designation of May 5, 2025, as the "National Day of Awareness for Missing and Murdered Indigenous Women and Girls".
S.Res. 201	May 5, 2025	A resolution expressing support for the designation of the week of May 4, 2025, through May 10, 2025, as "National Small Business Week" to celebrate the contributions of small businesses and entrepreneurs in every community in the United States.
S.Res. 202	May 5, 2025	A resolution recognizing the significance of "Community College Month" in April 2025 as a celebration of the more than 1,000 community colleges throughout the United States that support access to higher education, workforce training, and more, and broadly sustain and advance the economic prosperity of the United States.
S.Res. 203	May 5, 2025	A resolution expressing support for the designation of May 2025 as "Renewable Fuels Month" to recognize the important role that renewable fuels play in reducing carbon impacts, lowering fuel prices for consumers, supporting rural communities, and lessening reliance on foreign adversaries.
S.Res. 204	May 5, 2025	A resolution recognizing escalating threats to freedom of the press and freedom of speech worldwide, including increasing harm to journalists reporting in conflict zones and under repressive regimes, reaffirming the vital role that a free and independent press plays in upholding democracy, fostering economic prosperity, and keeping the public informed, and reaffirming freedom of the press as a priority of the United States Government in supporting democracy, human rights, and good governance in commemoration of "World Press Freedom Day" on May 3, 2025.
S.Res. 205	May 6, 2025	A resolution condemning recent attacks on the free press by President Donald J. Trump and reaffirming the United States commitment to preserving and protecting freedom of the press as a cornerstone of democracy.
S.Res. 206	May 6, 2025	A resolution supporting the goals and ideals of National Nurses Week, to be observed from May 6 through May 12, 2025.
S.Res. 207	May 6, 2025	A resolution celebrating the 100th anniversary of the Grand Ole Opry.
S.Res. 208	May 8, 2025	A resolution supporting the designation of May 10, 2025, as "National Asian American, Native Hawaiian, and Pacific Islander Mental Health Day".
S.Res. 209	May 8, 2025	A resolution commending Southeastern Louisiana University on the occasion of its Centennial and its years of service to the State of Louisiana and the United States.
S.Res. 210	May 8, 2025	A resolution honoring and commending the 80th anniversary of the Blinded Veterans Association.
S.Res. 211	May 8, 2025	A resolution designating May 10, 2025, as "World Migratory Bird Day".
S.Res. 212	May 8, 2025	A resolution affirming the acceptable outcome of any nuclear deal between the United States and the Islamic Republic of Iran, and for other purposes.
S.Res. 213	May 8, 2025	A resolution expressing support for the designation of May 2025 as "Fallen Heroes Memorial Month".
S.Res. 214	May 10, 2025	A resolution recognizing the significance of Asian American, Native Hawaiian, and Pacific Islander Heritage Month as an important time to celebrate the significant contributions of Asian Americans, Native Hawaiians, and Pacific Islanders to the history of the United States.
S.Res. 215	May 12, 2025	A resolution expressing support for the designation of the week of May 12, 2025, through May 16, 2025 as "Veterans Affairs Research Week" to celebrate the research, innovation, and significant contributions of the Department of Veterans Affairs to improving the lives of countless veterans, people in the United States, and individuals around the world.
S.Res. 216	May 12, 2025	A resolution expressing the sense of the Senate that public servants should be commended for their dedication and continued service to the United States during Public Service Recognition Week and throughout the year.
S.Res. 217	May 12, 2025	A resolution expressing the sense of the Senate that Secretary of Health and Human Services Robert Fitzgerald Kennedy Jr. does not have the confidence of the Senate or of the American people to faithfully carry out the duties of his office.
S.Res. 218	May 13, 2025	A resolution condemning any acceptance of Presidential aircraft, or any other substantial gift, from a foreign government.
S.Res. 219	May 13, 2025	A resolution directing the Senate Legal Counsel to bring a civil action in the name of the United States Senate to enforce the Foreign Emoluments Clause contained in clause 8 of section 9 of article I of the Constitution of the United States.
S.Res. 220	May 13, 2025	A resolution designating the week of May 11 through May 17, 2025, as "National Police Week".
S.Res. 221	May 13, 2025	A resolution congratulating the College of Idaho Yotes for winning the 2025 National Association of Intercollegiate Athletics Men's Basketball National Championship.
S.Res. 222	May 13, 2025	A resolution expressing support for the designation of May 2025 as "Motorcycle Safety Awareness Month".
S.Res. 223	May 13, 2025	A resolution commending and congratulating the Trinity College men's basketball team for winning the 2025 National Collegiate Athletic Association Division III Men's Basketball National Championship.
S.Res. 224	May 13, 2025	A resolution calling for the urgent delivery of humanitarian aid to address the needs of civilians in Gaza.
S.Res. 225	May 14, 2025	A resolution designating the week of September 14 through September 20, 2025, as "National Truck Driver Appreciation Week".
S.Res. 226	May 14, 2025	A resolution condemning the Government of the People's Republic of China for engaging in transnational repression.
S.Res. 227	May 14, 2025	A resolution condemning Hamas for its premeditated, coordinated, and brutal terrorist attacks on October 7, 2023, against Israel and demanding that Hamas immediately release all remaining hostages and return them to safety, and for other purposes.
S.Res. 229	May 14, 2025	A resolution to authorize the production of records by the Committee on Foreign Relations.
S.Res. 230	May 14, 2025	A resolution supporting the goals and ideals of National Hospital Week, to be observed from May 11 through May 17, 2025.
S.Res. 231	May 15, 2025	A resolution recognizing the roles and contributions of the teachers of the United States in building and enhancing the civic, cultural, and economic well-being of the United States.
S.Res. 232	May 15, 2025	A resolution designating May 2025 as "National Brain Tumor Awareness Month".
S.Res. 233	May 15, 2025	A resolution commending and congratulating the University of Florida men's basketball team for winning the 2025 National Collegiate Athletic Association Men's Basketball Championship.
S.Res. 234	May 19, 2025	A resolution designating May 2, 2025, as "United States Foreign Service Day" in recognition of the men and women who have served, or are presently serving, in the Foreign Service of the United States, and honoring the members of the Foreign Service who have given their lives in the line of duty.
S.Res. 235	May 19, 2025	A resolution designating May 17, 2025, as "Kids to Parks Day".
S.Res. 237	May 20, 2025	A resolution honoring the service and memory of Army Staff Sgt. Jose Duenez Jr., Army Staff Sgt. Edvin F. Franco, Army Staff Sgt. Troy S. Knutson-Collins, and Army Pfc. Dante D. Taitano of the 1st Armored Brigade Combat Team, 3rd Infantry Division, who died during a recovery mission in support of a regularly scheduled training exercise while serving in Lithuania.
S.Res. 246	May 22, 2025	A resolution recognizing the significance of Jewish American Heritage Month and calling on elected officials and civil society leaders to counter antisemitism.
S.Res. 247	May 22, 2025	A resolution designating May 2025 as "National Wildfire Preparedness Month".
S.Res. 250	May 22, 2025	A resolution recognizing National Foster Care Month as an opportunity to raise awareness about the challenges of children in the foster care system, and encouraging Congress to implement policies to improve the lives of children in the foster care system.
S.Res. 251	May 22, 2025	A resolution supporting the designation of May 4 through May 10, 2025, as "Children's Mental Health Awareness Week".
S.Res. 252	May 22, 2025	A resolution designating May 2025 as "Older Americans Month".
S.Res. 253	May 22, 2025	A resolution congratulating His Holiness Pope Leo XIV on his election to the papacy.
S.Res. 254	May 22, 2025	A resolution designating June 12, 2025, as "National Seersucker Day", designating every Thursday after National Seersucker Day through the last Thursday in August 2025 as "Seersucker Thursday", and designating June 2025 as "Seersucker Appreciation Month".
S.Res. 255	May 22, 2025	A resolution honoring the life, achievements, and legacy of former United States Senator Christopher "Kit" Bond of Missouri.
S.Res. 259	May 22, 2025	A resolution recognizing June 2, 2025, as the 39th anniversary of C-SPAN chronicling democracy in the Senate.
S.Res. 262	June 4, 2025	A resolution to authorize testimony, document production, and representation by the Senate Legal Counsel in the case of In re Architect of the Capitol Employment Dispute.
S.Res. 266	June 5, 2025	A resolution designating May 2025 as "ALS Awareness Month".
S.Res. 267	June 10, 2025	A resolution honoring the deep and enduring friendship between the Kingdom of Denmark and the United States on the occasion of Danish Constitution Day celebrations.
S.Res. 269	June 10, 2025	A resolution recognizing the 250th birthday of the United States Army.
S.Res. 270	June 10, 2025	A resolution designating June 6, 2025, as National Naloxone Awareness Day.
S.Res. 272	June 11, 2025	A resolution expressing support for the designation of the second Saturday in June as "Veterans Get Outside Day".
S.Res. 275	June 12, 2025	A resolution honoring the memory of the victims of the heinous attack at the Pulse nightclub on June 12, 2016.
S.Res. 276	June 12, 2025	A resolution designating June 12, 2025, as "Women Veterans Appreciation Day".
S.Res. 278	June 12, 2025	A resolution condemning the violent antisemitic attack in Boulder, Colorado, and expressing support for the survivors and their families.
S.Res. 279	June 16, 2025	A resolution designating June 2025 as "Great Outdoors Month".
S.Res. 282	June 17, 2025	A resolution commemorating June 17, 2025, as the tenth anniversary of the Mother Emanuel AME Church shooting.
S.Res. 283	June 17, 2025	A resolution commemorating the 90th birthday of His Holiness the 14th Dalai Lama on July 6, 2025, as "A Day of Compassion" and expressing support for the human rights and distinct religious, cultural, linguistic, and historical identity of the Tibetan people.
S.Res. 284	June 17, 2025	A resolution designating June 10, 2025, as "DACOR Bacon House Bicentennial Day".
S.Res. 284	June 17, 2025	A resolution designating June 10, 2025, as "DACOR Bacon House Bicentennial Day".
S.Res. 285	June 17, 2025	A resolution designating July 16, 2025, as "Glioblastoma Awareness Day".
S.Res. 286	June 17, 2025	A resolution recognizing the life, achievements, and public service of former First Lady Barbara Pierce Bush on the occasion of her 100th birthday.
S.Res. 288	June 18, 2025	A resolution condemning the rise in ideologically motivated attacks on Jewish individuals in the United States, including the recent violent assault in Boulder, Colorado, and reaffirming the commitment of the Senate to combating antisemitism and politically motivated violence.
S.Res. 290	June 18, 2025	A resolution commemorating June 19, 2025, as "Juneteenth National Independence Day" in recognition of June 19, 1865, the date on which news of the end of slavery reached the slaves in the Southwestern States.
S.Res. 293	June 18, 2025	A resolution commending the Minnesota Frost for winning the 2025 Professional Women's Hockey League Championship.
S.Res. 294	June 18, 2025	A resolution designating the week of May 18 through May 24, 2025, as "National Public Works Week".
S.Res. 298	June 24, 2025	A resolution congratulating the Oklahoma State University men's golf team for winning the 2025 National Collegiate Athletic Association Division I Men's Golf National Championship.
S.Res. 299	June 24, 2025	A resolution expressing support for the designation of July 2025 as "National Sarcoma Awareness Month".
S.Res. 300	June 24, 2025	A resolution designating June 15, 2025, as "World Elder Abuse Awareness Day" and the month of June 2025 as "Elder Abuse Awareness Month".
S.Res. 301	June 24, 2025	A resolution condemning the attacks on Minnesota lawmakers in Brooklyn Park and Champlin, Minnesota and calling for unity and the rejection of political violence in Minnesota and across the United States.
S.Res. 303	June 25, 2025	A resolution expressing support for the designation of May 17, 2025, as "DIPG Pediatric Brain Cancer Awareness Day" to raise awareness of, and encourage research on, diffuse intrinsic pontine glioma tumors and pediatric cancers in general.
S.Res. 304	June 25, 2025	A resolution commemorating the 75th anniversary of the outbreak of the Korean War and reaffirming the critical importance of maintaining military readiness in defense of the United States and its allies.
S.Res. 308	June 26, 2025	A resolution honoring the life, achievements, and legacy of Frederick W. Smith.
S.Res. 309	June 26, 2025	A resolution commemorating the 65th anniversary of the Marshall Space Flight Center and recognizing its continued leadership in the development of the Space Launch System and human space exploration.
S.Res. 314	July 8, 2025	A resolution recognizing the importance of trademarks in the economy and the role of trademarks in protecting consumer safety, by designating the month of July as "National Anti-Counterfeiting and Consumer Education and Awareness Month".
S.Res. 315	July 8, 2025	A resolution expressing support for the designation of July 10, 2025, as Journeyman Lineworkers Recognition Day.
S.Res. 319	July 10, 2025	A resolution recognizing and celebrating 100 years of quantum mechanics.
S.Res. 321	July 15, 2025	A resolution commemorating 30 years of diplomatic relations between the United States and Vietnam on July 11, 2025.
S.Res. 322	July 15, 2025	A resolution expressing support for the designation of the month of June 2025 as "National Post-Traumatic Stress Awareness Month" and June 27, 2025, as "National Post-Traumatic Stress Awareness Day".
S.Res. 328	July 21, 2025	A resolution congratulating Louisiana State University in Shreveport for the first undefeated season in collegiate baseball history and for winning the 2025 National Association of Intercollegiate Athletics Baseball World Series.
S.Res. 329	July 21, 2025	A resolution congratulating Louisiana State University on their victory in the 2025 National Collegiate Athletic Association Division I College World Series.
S.Res. 330	July 21, 2025	A resolution designating June 23, 2025, as "Social Media Harms Victim Remembrance Day".
S.Res. 332	July 21, 2025	A resolution designating July 26, 2025, as "National Day of the American Cowboy".
S.Res. 333	July 23, 2025	A resolution commending and congratulating the Florida Panthers on winning the 2025 Stanley Cup Final.
S.Res. 337	July 24, 2025	A resolution recognizing the 250th anniversary of the postal service of the United States.
S.Res. 340	July 29, 2025	A resolution designating July 30, 2025, as "National Whistleblower Appreciation Day".
S.Res. 344	July 29, 2025	A resolution observing the 20th anniversary of the date on which Hurricane Katrina devastated the Gulf Coast and recognizing the progress of efforts to rebuild the affected Gulf Coast region.
S.Res. 345	July 29, 2025	A resolution congratulating the Oklahoma City Thunder on winning the 2025 National Basketball Association Finals.
S.Res. 349	July 30, 2025	A resolution designating the week of August 3 through August 9, 2025, as "National Farmers Market Week".
S.Res. 361	July 31, 2025	A resolution designating August 16, 2025, "National Airborne Day".
S.Res. 362	July 31, 2025	A resolution to provide for the printing of the Senate Manual for the One Hundred Nineteenth Congress.
S.Res. 363	August 1, 2025	A resolution solemnly marking the one-year anniversary of the attempted assassination of President Donald J. Trump, condemning the multiple attempts against the President's life, condemning those who incite violence against political officials, and honoring the victims of the shooting.
S.Res. 367	August 1, 2025	A resolution designating July 2025 as "American Grown Flower and Foliage Month"
S.Res. 369	August 2, 2025	A resolution designating August 21, 2025, as "Fentanyl Prevention and Awareness Day".
S.Res. 370	August 2, 2025	A resolution commending the Superdome on the occasion of its golden jubilee and its years of service to the State of Louisiana and the United States.
S.Res. 371	September 2, 2025	A resolution honoring the victims and survivors of the mass shooting at the Annunciation Catholic Church and School in Minneapolis, Minnesota.
S.Res. 372	September 3, 2025	A resolution honoring the life of Kansas City, Kansas police officer Hunter Simoncic.
S.Res. 377	September 8, 2025	An executive resolution authorizing the en bloc consideration in Executive Session of certain nominations on the Executive Calendar.
S.Res. 387	September 15, 2025	A resolution expressing support for the designation of the week of September 11 through September 17, 2025, as "Patriot Week".
S.Res. 388	September 15, 2025	A resolution recognizing September 16, 2025, as "National Voter Registration Day".
S.Res. 391	September 16, 2025	A resolution condemning the assassination of Charlie Kirk and honoring his life and legacy.
S.Res. 392	September 16, 2025	A resolution expressing support for the designation of November 16, 2025, as "National Warrior Call Day" and recognizing the importance of connecting members of the Armed Forces and veterans in the United States to support structures necessary to transition from the battlefield, especially peer-to-peer connection.
S.Res. 393	September 16, 2025	A resolution designating September 25, 2025, as "National Lobster Day".
S.Res. 394	September 16, 2025	A resolution designating September 2025 as "National Literacy Month".
S.Res. 395	September 16, 2025	A resolution recognizing and supporting the goals and ideals of National Forensic Science Week.
S.Res. 396	September 16, 2025	A resolution condemning the tragic act of violence on September 10, 2025, in Evergreen, Colorado, recognizing the victims, survivors, and responders, and expressing condolences and support to their families and their communities.
S.Res. 399	September 17, 2025	A resolution congratulating the people of North Macedonia on the 34th anniversary of their independence and celebrating the 30th anniversary of diplomatic relations between North Macedonia and the United States.
S.Res. 400	September 17, 2025	A resolution expressing support for designation of the week of September 14 through 20, 2025, as "National Adult Education and Family Literacy Week".
S.Res. 403	September 18, 2025	A resolution expressing support for the designation of October 14, 2025, as the "National Day of Remembrance for Charlie Kirk".
S.Res. 406	September 18, 2025	A resolution designating September 30, 2025, as "Impact Aid Recognition Day" to recognize and celebrate the 75th anniversary of the establishment of the Impact Aid program.
S.Res. 412	September 18, 2025	An executive resolution authorizing the en bloc consideration in Executive Session of certain nominations on the Executive Calendar.
S.Res. 413	September 18, 2025	A resolution authorizing the use of funds from the Senators' Official Personnel and Office Expense Account for security enhancements and services provided to Senators.
S.Res. 414	September 19, 2025	A resolution designating September 2025 as "National Child Awareness Month" to promote awareness of charities that benefit children as well as youth-serving organizations throughout the United States and recognizing the efforts made by those charities and organizations on behalf of children and youth as critical contributions to the future of the United States.
S.Res. 415	September 19, 2025	A resolution designating the week of September 21 through September 27, 2025, as "Gold Star Families Remembrance Week".
S.Res. 416	September 19, 2025	A resolution expressing support for the designation of September 2025 as "Sickle Cell Disease Awareness Month" in order to educate communities across the United States about sickle cell disease and the need for research, early detection methods, effective treatments, and preventative care programs with respect to complications from sickle cell disease and conditions related to sickle cell disease.
S.Res. 417	September 19, 2025	A resolution supporting the designation of the week of September 14 through September 20, 2025, as "Telehealth Awareness Week".
S.Res. 418	September 19, 2025	A resolution expressing support for the designation of the week of September 20 through September 27, 2025, as "National Estuaries Week".
S.Res. 420	September 29, 2025	A resolution supporting the designation of September 19, 2025, as "National Concussion Awareness Day".
S.Res. 422	September 29, 2025	A resolution recognizing the seriousness of polycystic ovary syndrome (PCOS) and expressing support for the designation of September 2025 as "PCOS Awareness Month".
S.Res. 425	September 30, 2025	A resolution honoring the life of Hays, Kansas police sergeant Scott Heimann.
S.Res. 427	September 30, 2025	A resolution designating October 8, 2025, as "National Hydrogen and Fuel Cell Day".
S.Res. 428	September 30, 2025	A resolution recognizing Hispanic Heritage Month and celebrating the heritage and culture of Latinos in the United States and the immense contributions of Latinos to the United States.
S.Res. 429	September 30, 2025	A resolution designating September 2025 as "National Infant Mortality Awareness Month", raising awareness of infant mortality, and increasing efforts to reduce infant mortality.
S.Res. 431	October 3, 2025	A resolution supporting the goals and objectives of Choose Respect Day.
S.Res. 432	October 6, 2025	A resolution to designate September 9, 2025, as "National World War II Italian Campaign Remembrance Day", and to recognize the sacrifices made by American and Allied soldiers who liberated Italy from German occupation during World War II.
S.Res. 433	October 6, 2025	A resolution expressing support for the contributions and achievements of student parents in seeking and completing a postsecondary education and designating September 2025 as "National Student Parent Month".
S.Res. 434	October 6, 2025	A resolution expressing support for the designation of October 5 through October 11, 2025, as "National 4-H Week".
S.Res. 435	October 6, 2025	A resolution honoring the life of Brian Douglas Wilson as a rock-n-roll and pop icon, a musical genius, and one of the greatest composers, songwriters, and innovators in the history of the United States.
S.Res. 436	October 6, 2025	A resolution expressing support for the designation of September 2025 as "National Prostate Cancer Awareness Month".
S.Res. 437	October 6, 2025	A resolution honoring the pilots, maintainers, analysts, sailors, support aircraft, and families, among various other essential groups involved in the success of Operation Midnight Hammer.
S.Res. 440	October 7, 2025	A resolution designating September 2025 as "National Spinal Cord Injury Awareness Month".
S.Res. 441	October 7, 2025	A resolution designating the week of October 5, 2025, through October 11, 2025, as "National Community Policing Week".
S.Res. 444	October 9, 2025	A resolution condemning the dictator of the People's Republic of China, Xi Jinping, for deceit, undermining prospects for peace and security, and orchestrating crimes against humanity.
S.Res. 446	October 9, 2025	A resolution recognizing the 250th birthday of the United States Navy.
S.Res. 447	October 9, 2025	A resolution designating September 25, 2025, as "National Ataxia Awareness Day", and raising awareness of ataxia, ataxia research, and the search for a cure.
S.Res. 448	October 9, 2025	A resolution designating October 1, 2025, as "Energy Efficiency Day" in celebration of the economic and environmental benefits that have been driven by private sector innovation and Federal energy efficiency policies.
S.Res. 449	October 9, 2025	A resolution designating the week beginning on October 12, 2025, as "National Wildlife Refuge Week".
S.Res. 452	October 15, 2025	A resolution designating the week beginning October 19, 2025, as "National Character Counts Week".
S.Res. 453	October 15, 2025	A resolution designating the week beginning September 7, 2025, as "National Direct Support Professionals Week".
S.Res. 454	October 16, 2025	A resolution expressing support for the designation of the week of October 24, 2025, to October 31, 2025, as "Bat Week".
S.Res. 455	October 16, 2025	A resolution commending and congratulating the Summerlin South Little League baseball team on winning the 2025 Little League World Series United States Championship.
S.Res. 456	October 16, 2025	A resolution commemorating the 40th anniversary of the inaugural flight of Space Shuttle Atlantis and recognizing Kennedy Space Center for its economic, educational, and cultural contributions to the State of Florida and the United States.
S.Res. 459	October 21, 2025	A resolution honoring the strategic importance of the C5+1 diplomatic platform and recognizing the deepening partnership between the United States and the nations of Kazakhstan, Kyrgyzstan, Tajikistan, Turkmenistan, and Uzbekistan.
S.Res. 463	October 23, 2025	A resolution expressing condemnation of the Chinese Communist Party's persecution of religious minority groups, including Christians, Muslims, and Buddhists and the detention of Pastor "Ezra" Jin Mingri and leaders of the Zion Church, and reaffirming the United States' global commitment to promote religious freedom and tolerance.
S.Res. 464	October 23, 2025	A resolution designating September 2025 as "National Cholesterol Education Month" and September 30, 2025, as "LDL-C Awareness Day".
S.Res. 465	October 23, 2025	A resolution designating September 2025 as "National Childhood Cancer Awareness Month".
S.Res. 467	October 27, 2025	A resolution designating October 30, 2025, as a national day of remembrance for the workers of the nuclear weapons program of the United States.
S.Res. 468	October 27, 2025	A resolution designating October 26, 2025, as the "Day of the Deployed".
S.Res. 469	October 27, 2025	A resolution designating the week of October 19 through 25, 2025, as "National Chemistry Week".
S.Res. 471	October 28, 2025	A resolution calling on Congress, schools, and State and local educational agencies to recognize the significant educational implications of dyslexia that must be addressed, and designating October 2025 as "National Dyslexia Awareness Month".
S.Res. 474	October 29, 2025	A resolution designating October 2025 as "National Country Music Month".
S.Res. 475	October 29, 2025	A resolution designating November 1, 2025, as "National Bison Day".
S.Res. 478	October 30, 2025	A resolution to authorize testimony, document production, and representation by the Senate Legal Counsel in the case of United States v. Kaminski.
S.Res. 479	October 30, 2025	A resolution supporting the goals and ideals of Red Ribbon Week during the period of October 23 through October 31, 2025.
S.Res. 482	November 4, 2025	A resolution recognizing the week of November 3 through November 7, 2025, as "National Veterans Small Business Week".
S.Res. 483	November 5, 2025	A resolution honoring the extraordinary life, leadership, and legacy of Dr. Jane Goodall.
S.Res. 484	November 5, 2025	A resolution designating October 2025 as "School Bus Safety Month".
S.Res. 485	November 5, 2025	A resolution designating the month of October 2025 as "National Military Toxic Exposures Awareness Month".
S.Res. 489	November 6, 2025	A resolution commending Delta State University in Cleveland, Mississippi, for 100 years of service to the State of Mississippi and the United States.
S.Res. 489	November 10, 2025	A resolution recognizing community care as an essential tool for meeting the health care needs of the veterans of the United States.
S.Res. 494	November 10, 2025	A resolution observing the 50th anniversary of the date on which the SS Edmund Fitzgerald sank in Lake Superior, and remembering the 29 lives lost in one of the worst storms ever recorded on the Great Lakes.
S.Res. 495	November 10, 2025	A resolution recognizing the 50th anniversary of the end of the Vietnam War and honoring the United States veterans who served during the conflict.
S.Res. 496	November 10, 2025	A resolution expressing support for the designation of November 8, 2025, as "National First-Generation College Celebration Day".
S.Res. 497	November 10, 2025	A resolution permitting the collection of clothing, toys, food, and housewares during the holiday season for charitable purposes in Senate buildings.
S.Res. 498	November 10, 2025	A resolution honoring Dr. Jane Goodall and her legacy as an ethologist, conservationist, and activist.
S.Res. 501	November 18, 2025	A resolution recognizing National Native American Heritage Month and celebrating the heritages and cultures of Native Americans and the contributions of Native Americans to the United States.
S.Res. 507	November 19, 2025	A resolution designating November 2025 as "National Lung Cancer Awareness Month".
S.Res. 508	November 19, 2025	A resolution supporting the goals and ideals of American Education Week.
S.Res. 513	November 20, 2025	A resolution recognizing the importance of the United States-Japan alliance to the peace, security, and prosperity of the Indo-Pacific region and the world.
S.Res. 515	November 20, 2025	A resolution congratulating the Los Angeles Dodgers for winning the 2025 Major League Baseball World Series.
S.Res. 518	December 3, 2025	A resolution designating October 2025 as "National Principals Month".
S.Res. 519	December 3, 2025	A resolution recognizing the achievements and contributions of the AH–64 Apache attack helicopter to the national defense of the United States and its allies and honoring the dedication, service, and sacrifice of the United States Army aviators, maintainers, and support personnel who operate and sustain the Apache.
S.Res. 526	December 3, 2025	A resolution withholding the pay of Senators if a Government shutdown occurs.
S.Res. 527	December 3, 2025	A resolution designating November 13, 2025, as "National Red Ribbon Day".
S.Res. 528	December 3, 2025	A resolution supporting after-school programs and Lights On Afterschool, a national celebration of after-school programs.
S.Res. 531	December 4, 2025	A resolution celebrating the 50th anniversary of the Individuals with Disabilities Education Act on November 29, 2025, and recognizing its transformative impact on the education of children with disabilities.
S.Res. 532	December 4, 2025	An executive resolution authorizing the en bloc consideration in Executive Session of certain nominations on the Executive Calendar.
S.Res. 535	December 8, 2025	A resolution designating December 14, 2025, as "National Wreaths Across America Day".
S.Res. 536	December 9, 2025	A resolution honoring the life, bravery, and memory of Sergeant Rose Ida Lubin.
S.Res. 537	December 9, 2025	A resolution honoring the service and sacrifice of United States Army Specialist Sarah Beckstrom and United States Air Force Staff Sergeant Andrew Wolfe, who were tragically shot in Washington, D.C., in a targeted assault against United States service members on November 26, 2025.
S.Res. 538	December 10, 2025	A resolution designating December 10, 2025, as "National Space Day".
S.Res. 539	December 11, 2025	A resolution commending the actions of the United States Secret Service and local law enforcement in preventing an attempted attack.
S.Res. 544	December 11, 2025	A resolution designating December 13, 2025, as "National Wreaths Across America Day".
S.Res. 545	December 11, 2025	A resolution designating December 6, 2025, as "National Miners Day".
S.Res. 546	December 16, 2025	A resolution designating November 2025 as "National Hospice and Palliative Care Month".
S.Res. 570	December 18, 2025	A resolution designating November 2025 as "National Lung Cancer Awareness Month" and expressing support for early detection and treatment of lung cancer.
S.Res. 571	December 18, 2025	A resolution remembering the December 6, 2019, terrorist attack at Naval Air Station Pensacola and commemorating those who lost their lives, and those who were injured, in the line of duty.
S.Res. 572	December 18, 2025	A resolution honoring the service and sacrifice of United States Army Sergeant William Nathaniel Howard and United States Army Sergeant Edgar Brian Torres-Tovar, who were killed in action in Palmyra, Syria, in a targeted assault against United States service members on December 13, 2025.
S.Res. 575	January 6, 2026	A resolution congratulating the Oklahoma State University men's cross country team for winning the 2025 National Collegiate Athletic Association Men's Division I Cross Country National Championship.
S.Res. 580	January 8, 2026	A resolution directing the Architect of the Capitol to prominently display, in a publicly accessible location in the Senate wing of the United States Capitol, a plaque honoring the members of law enforcement responding on January 6, 2021, until the plaque can be placed in its permanent location.
S.Res. 581	February 3, 2026	A resolution honoring the life of Corporal Grade One Matthew T. Ty Snook of the Delaware State Police.
S.Res. 585	January 15, 2026	A resolution honoring the life, achievements, and legacy of Ben Nighthorse Campbell.
S.Res. 586	February 9, 2026	A resolution raising awareness and encouraging the prevention of stalking by designating January 2026 as "National Stalking Awareness Month".
S.Res. 589	January 27, 2026	A resolution congratulating the Montana State University football team for winning the 2025 Division I Football Championship Subdivision Championship.
S.Res. 591	January 28, 2026	A resolution recognizing the 30th anniversary of the first flight of the F/A-18 E1 Super Hornet from Lambert Field in St. Louis, Missouri, and the 30 years of service of the F/A-18E/F Super Hornet to the United States Navy and to allies of the United States.
S.Res. 592	January 29, 2026	A resolution supporting the designation of 2026 as the "International Year of the Woman Farmer" to recognize and honor the critical role of women in agriculture.
S.Res. 593	January 29, 2026	A resolution honoring the victims of the 2025 Potomac River mid-air collision.
S.Res. 594	January 29, 2026	A resolution supporting the contributions of Catholic schools in the United States and celebrating the 52nd annual National Catholic Schools Week.
S.Res. 595	January 30, 2026	A resolution congratulating the Indiana University Hoosiers football team for winning the 2026 College Football Playoff National Championship and completing an undefeated 16–0 season.
S.Res. 596	February 4, 2026	A resolution designating April 2026 as "Financial Literacy Month".
S.Res. 600	February 5, 2026	A resolution recognizing January 2026 as "National Mentoring Month".
S.Res. 601	February 9, 2026	A resolution raising awareness and encouraging the prevention of stalking by designating January 2026 as "National Stalking Awareness Month".
S.Res. 602	February 9, 2026	A resolution supporting the goals and ideals of Career and Technical Education Month.
S.Res. 603	February 9, 2026	A resolution congratulating the North Dakota State University Bison football team for winning the 2025 National Collegiate Athletic Association Division I Football Championship Subdivision National Championship.
S.Res. 609	February 12, 2026	A resolution designating February 2026 as "National Teen Dating Violence Awareness and Prevention Month".
S.Res. 610	February 12, 2026	A resolution celebrating the 100th anniversary of the 1926 serum run to Nome, Alaska, and the historic journey of the mushers and sled dogs that delivered lifesaving diphtheria antitoxin.
S.Res. 611	February 12, 2026	A resolution expressing support for the designation of February 14, 2026, as "National Bison Day".
S.Res. 613	February 12, 2026	A resolution celebrating Black History Month.
S.Res. 614	February 12, 2026	A resolution authorizing the production of records by the Permanent Subcommittee on Investigations of the Committee on Homeland Security and Governmental Affairs.
S.Res. 615	February 12, 2026	A resolution to authorize testimony and representation in United States v. Charles.
S.Res. 617	February 17, 2026	A resolution designating February 17, 2026, as "National Defense University Day".
S.Res. 618	February 17, 2026	A resolution expressing support for the designation of the week of February 16 through February 20, 2026, as "National Entrepreneurship Week".
S.Res. 619	February 17, 2026	A resolution honoring the life and legacy of former Senator Robert "Bob" Dole.
S.Res. 620	February 17, 2026	A resolution recognizing the significance of the 2026 Winter Olympics and Paralympics and wishing luck to United States athletes.
S.Res. 622	February 24, 2026	A resolution celebrating the 150th anniversary of the founding of the Johns Hopkins University.
S.Res. 626	March 2, 2026	A resolution designating March 2, 2026, as "Read Across America Day".
S.Res. 627	March 3, 2026	A resolution expressing support for the designation of March 3, 2026, as "World Wildlife Day".
S.Res. 629	March 4, 2026	A resolution congratulating the players, coaches, and staff of the Kansas City Chiefs for their victory in Super Bowl LX.
S.Res. 642	March 17, 2026	A resolution supporting the goals and ideals of National Women's History Month.
S.Res. 644	March 18, 2026	A resolution recognizing the 100th anniversary of the founding of the American Association of Physicists in Medicine.
S.Res. 647	March 19, 2026	A resolution designating March 2026 as "National Colorectal Cancer Awareness Month".
S.Res. 648	March 23, 2026	A resolution commemorating the 100th anniversary of the United States Foreign Service.
S.Res. 649	March 24, 2026	A resolution honoring the life and legacy of former First Lady Rosalynn Carter.
S.Res. 650	March 24, 2026	A resolution designating March 24, 2026, as "National Women's History Day".
S.Res. 652	March 25, 2026	A resolution congratulating the University of South Carolina Gamecocks women's basketball team for winning the 2026 National Collegiate Athletic Association Division I Women's Basketball Tournament.
S.Res. 653	March 26, 2026	A resolution honoring the memory of the victims of the targeted attack in Boulder, Colorado, on March 22, 2021.
S.Res. 655	March 30, 2026	A resolution designating April 2026 as "National Donate Life Month".
S.Res. 656	March 30, 2026	A resolution supporting the goals and ideals of National Public Health Week.
S.Res. 660	April 1, 2026	A resolution authorizing the production of records by the Permanent Subcommittee on Investigations of the Committee on Homeland Security and Governmental Affairs.
S.Res. 661	March 25, 2026	A resolution recognizing the 205th anniversary of the independence of Greece and celebrating democracy in Greece and the United States.
S.Res. 664	March 26, 2026	A resolution to constitute the majority party's membership on certain committees for the One Hundred Nineteenth Congress, or until their successors are chosen.
S.Res. 665	March 27, 2026	A resolution designating April 2026 as "National Native Plant Month".
S.Res. 666	April 1, 2026	A resolution designating the first week of April as "National Asbestos Awareness Week".
S.Res. 668	April 14, 2026	A resolution designating April 2026 as "Second Chance Month".
S.Res. 669	April 14, 2026	A resolution supporting the goals and ideals of "Deep Vein Thrombosis and Pulmonary Embolism Awareness Month".
S.Res. 670	April 15, 2026	A resolution supporting the goals and ideals of the 2026 Day of Silence in bringing attention to anti-LGBTQI+ bullying, harassment, discrimination, and other forms of victimization faced by individuals in schools, and calling on communities across the country to take action to demand equal educational opportunity, basic civil rights protections, and freedom from erasure for all students, particularly LGBTQI+ young people, in K-12 schools.
S.Res. 673	April 15, 2026	A resolution supporting the goals and ideals of National Safe Digging Month.
S.Res. 676	April 16, 2026	A resolution recognizing and honoring National Mushroom Day and the contributions of Chester and Berks Counties to the national mushroom industry and to healthy diets.
S.Res. 679	April 16, 2026	A resolution recognizing April 14, 2026, as "World Quantum Day", and commemorating and supporting the goals of World Quantum Day.
S.Res. 680	April 20, 2026	A resolution commemorating the 10th anniversary of the Columbine Day of Service and honoring the memories of the victims, survivors, and their families.
S.Res. 681	April 20, 2026	A resolution relating to the life and death of Chuck Norris.
S.Res. 685	April 22, 2026	A resolution designating April 22, 2026, as "National Assistive Technology Awareness Day".
S.Res. 686	April 22, 2026	A resolution recognizing the significance of Community College Month in April as a celebration of more than 1,000 institutions throughout the United States supporting access to higher education, workforce training, and more broadly sustaining and advancing the economic prosperity of the United States.
S.Res. 689	April 27, 2026	A resolution congratulating the University of South Carolina Aiken women's polo team on winning the 2026 United States Polo Association Division I Women's National Intercollegiate Championship.
S.Res. 690	April 27, 2026	An executive resolution authorizing the en bloc consideration in Executive Session of certain nominations on the Executive Calendar.
S.Res. 692	April 28, 2026	A resolution designating the week of April 20 through April 24, 2026, as "National Home Visiting Week".
S.Res. 693	April 28, 2026	A resolution recognizing and supporting the goals and ideals of National Sexual Assault Awareness and Prevention Month.
S.Res. 694	April 28, 2026	A resolution designating April 2026 as "Financial Literacy Month".
S.Res. 695	April 28, 2026	A resolution commemorating April 6, 2026, as the day the Artemis II crew surpassed the record for the furthest distance traveled by astronauts into deep space and celebrating the success of the Artemis II mission.
S.Res. 696	April 28, 2026	A resolution expressing support for the designation of the month of April 2026 as "Parkinson's Awareness Month".
S.Res. 697	April 28, 2026	A resolution welcoming Their Majesties King Charles III and Queen Camilla of the United Kingdom to the United States on the occasion of His Majesty's address to a joint meeting of Congress, and recognizing the historic global significance of the United States–United Kingdom relationship.
S.Res. 701	April 29, 2026	A resolution designating the week of April 20 through 26, 2026, as "National Dark Sky Week".
S.Res. 702	April 29, 2026	A resolution commending the American Chemical Society on the occasion of its 150th anniversary and recognizing its many years of service to the United States.
S.Res. 703	April 29, 2026	A resolution expressing support for the designation of the week of May 3, 2026, through May 9, 2026, as "National Small Business Week" to celebrate the contributions of small businesses and entrepreneurs in every community in the United States.
S.Res. 704	April 29, 2026	A resolution supporting the mission and goals of National Fentanyl Awareness Day in 2026, including increasing individual and public awareness of the impact of fake or counterfeit fentanyl pills on families and young people.
S.Res. 705	April 29, 2026	A resolution commending the "Donut Dollies" for their patriotic service and steadfast support of United States servicemembers in combat and honoring their extraordinary contributions to the morale and well-being of United States servicemembers during wartime.
S.Res. 706	April 29, 2026	A resolution expressing support for the designation of April 2026 as "National Child Abuse Prevention Month", and the goals and ideals of National Child Abuse Prevention Month.
S.Res. 708	April 30, 2026	A resolution amending rule XXXVII of the Standing Rules of the Senate to prohibit Senators from trading on prediction markets.
S.Res. 711	April 30, 2026	A resolution expressing support for the designation of May 2026 as "National Beef Month" to recognize the important role cattle play in the United States, and to consumers.
S.Res. 718	April 30, 2026	A resolution commending and congratulating the University of California, Los Angeles Bruins women's basketball team for winning the 2026 National Collegiate Athletic Association Division I Women's Basketball National Championship.
S.Res. 719	April 30, 2026	A resolution celebrating the 154th anniversary of Arbor Day.
S.Res. 720	April 30, 2026	A resolution recognizing the significance of Asian American, Native Hawaiian, and Pacific Islander Heritage Month as an important time to celebrate the significant contributions of Asian Americans, Native Hawaiians, and Pacific Islanders to the history of the United States.
S.Res. 723	May 11, 2026	A resolution honoring the life of Dirk Arthur Kempthorne, former United States Senator for the State of Idaho.
S.Res. 724	May 11, 2026	A resolution recognizing the roles and contributions of the teachers of the United States in building and enhancing the civic, cultural, and economic well-being of the United States.
S.Res. 725	May 12, 2026	A resolution congratulating the University of Oklahoma women's gymnastics team for winning the 2026 National Collegiate Athletic Association Championship, the eighth national title in program history.
S.Res. 726	May 12, 2026	A resolution expressing support for the designation of May 5, 2026, as "National Day of Awareness for Missing and Murdered Indigenous Women and Girls".
S.Res. 727	May 13, 2026	A resolution supporting the designation of May 29, 2026, as "Mental Health Awareness in Agriculture Day" to raise awareness around mental health in the agricultural industry and workforce and to continue to reduce stigma associated with mental illness.
S.Res. 728	May 13, 2026	A resolution expressing the sense of the Senate that the President should prioritize securing the release of Pastor Jin Mingri, Pastor Gao Quanfu, Pang Yu, Jimmy Lai, Dr. Gulshan Abbas, and Ekpar Asat detained by the People's Republic of China during future engagements with Chinese President Xi Jinping.
S.Res. 729	May 14, 2026	A resolution recognizing and honoring Meriwether Lewis and William Clark, and the Corps of Discovery, for their expedition to explore the Louisiana Purchase.
S.Res. 730	May 14, 2026	A resolution congratulating the University of Hawaii men's volleyball team for winning the 2026 National Collegiate Athletic Association Men's Volleyball Championship.
S.Res. 733	May 14, 2026	A resolution expressing the sense of the Senate that public servants should be commended for their dedication and continued service to the United States during Public Service Recognition Week and throughout the year.
S.Res. 734	May 14, 2026	A resolution designating May 16, 2026, as "Kids to Parks Day".
S.Res. 735	May 14, 2026	A resolution designating the week of May 10 through May 16, 2026, as "National Police Week".
S.Res. 736	May 14, 2026	A resolution supporting the goals and ideals of National Hospital Week, to be observed from May 10 through May 16, 2026.
S.Res. 737	May 14, 2026	A resolution recognizing National Foster Care Month as an opportunity to raise awareness about the challenges of children in the foster care system and to encourage Congress to implement policies to improve the lives of children in the foster care system.
S.Res. 738	May 19, 2026	A resolution recognizing the significance of Jewish American Heritage Month and calling on elected officials and civil society leaders to counter antisemitism.
S.Res. 739	May 19, 2026	A resolution honoring the life and legacy of John Seymour, the late Senator for the State of California.
S.Res. 740	May 19, 2026	A resolution expressing support for the designation of May 2026 as "Motorcycle Safety Awareness Month".
S.Res. 741	May 20, 2026	A resolution designating May 2026 as "National Wildfire Preparedness Month".
S.Res. 745	May 20, 2026	A resolution to authorize production of records to the United States Attorney.
S.Res. 746	May 20, 2026	A resolution designating May 2026 as "National Brain Tumor Awareness Month".
S.Res. 747	May 21, 2026	A resolution expressing support for the designation of May 2026 as "Renewable Fuels Month" to recognize the important role that renewable fuels play in lowering fuel prices for consumers, lessening reliance on foreign adversaries, supporting rural communities, and reducing carbon impacts.
S.Res. 749	May 21, 2026	A resolution designating May 2026 as "Older Americans Month".
S.Res. 750	May 21, 2026	A resolution recognizing "National Public Works Week" and the contributions of public works professionals.
S.Res. 751	May 21, 2026	A resolution designating May 2026 as "ALS Awareness Month".
S.Res. 755	June 1, 2026	A resolution honoring the life of the Honorable Donald W. Riegle Jr., former Senator for the State of Michigan.
S.Res. 757	June 8, 2026	A resolution designating June 11, 2026, as "National Seersucker Day", designating every subsequent Thursday through the last Thursday in August 2026 as "Seersucker Thursday", and designating June 2026 as "Seersucker Appreciation Month".
S.Res. 758	June 8, 2026	A resolution expressing support for the designation of the month of June 2026 as "National Post-Traumatic Stress Awareness Month" and June 27, 2026, as "National Post-Traumatic Stress Awareness Day".
S.Res. 761	June 9, 2026	A resolution designating June 23, 2026, as "Social Media Harms Victim Remembrance Day".
S.Res. 764	June 9, 2026	A resolution congratulating the students, parents, teachers, and leaders of charter schools across the United States for making ongoing contributions to education and supporting the ideals and goals of the 27th Annual National Charter Schools Week, to be held May 10 through May 16, 2026.
S.Res. 765	June 9, 2026	A resolution expressing support for the designation of July 2026 as "National Sarcoma Awareness Month".
S.Res. 768	June 11, 2026	A resolution commemorating the anniversary of the antisemitic attack on participants in the Run for Their Lives walk in Boulder, Colorado on June 1, 2025.
S.Res. 770	June 15, 2026	A resolution designating June 6, 2026, as National Naloxone Awareness Day.
S.Res. 771	June 17, 2026	A resolution congratulating the New York Knicks on winning the 2026 National Basketball Association Finals.
S.Res. 776	June 17, 2026	A resolution honoring the life of Kyle Busch.
S.Res. 777	June 17, 2026	A resolution designating May 1, 2026, as "United States Foreign Service Day" in recognition of the men and women who have served, or are presently serving, in the United States Foreign Service, and honoring those who have given their lives in the line of duty.
S.Res. 783	June 22, 2026	A resolution expressing support for the designation of June 11, 2026, as "Anti-Illicit Trade Awareness Day".
S.Res. 786	June 23, 2026	A resolution designating July 15, 2026, as "Glioblastoma Awareness Day".
S.Res. 792	June 24, 2026	A resolution designating June 30, 2026, as "Asteroid Day".
S.Res. 793	June 24, 2026	A resolution congratulating the Johnson County Community College Cavaliers on winning the 2026 National Junior College Athletic Association Division I Baseball National Championship.
S.Res. 794	June 24, 2026	A resolution expressing support for the designation of July 10, 2026, as Journeyman Lineworkers Recognition Day.
S.Res. 795	June 24, 2026	A resolution commemorating the 150th anniversary of the Battle of the Little Bighorn.

== See also ==
- List of acts of the 119th United States Congress
- Procedures of the U.S. Congress
- List of United States federal legislation
- List of executive actions by Donald Trump
- List of executive orders in the second presidency of Donald Trump
