= Donut Dollies =

Donut Dollies may refer to:

- Women who volunteered in the American Red Cross Clubmobile Service during World War II
- Women who volunteered in the ARC Supplemental Recreation Overseas Program during the Vietnam war
