= History of health care reform in the United States =

The history of health care reform in the United States has spanned many decades with health care reform having been the subject of political debate since the early part of the 20th century. Recent reforms remain an active political issue. Alternative reform proposals were offered by both of the major candidates in the 2008, 2016, and 2020 presidential elections.

== Federal health care proposals ==
=== Late 18th century ===
On July 16, 1798, President John Adams signed the first Federal public health law, "An act for the relief of sick and disabled Seamen." This assessed every seaman at American ports 20 cents a month. This was the first prepaid medical care plan in the United States. The money was used for the care of sick seamen and the building of seamen's hospitals. This act created the Marine Hospital Service under the Department of the Treasury. In 1802 Marine Hospitals were operating in Boston; Newport; Norfolk; and Charleston, S.C. and medical services were contracted in other ports.

=== 19th century ===
Another of the earliest health care proposals at the federal level was the 1854 Bill for the Benefit of the Indigent Insane, which would have established asylums for the indigent insane, as well as the blind and deaf, via federal land grants to the states. This bill was proposed by activist Dorothea Dix and passed both houses of Congress, but was vetoed by President Franklin Pierce. Pierce argued that the federal government should not commit itself to social welfare, which he stated was the responsibility of the states.

After the American Civil War, the federal government established the first system of medical care in the South, known as the Freedmen's Bureau. The government constructed 40 hospitals, employed over 120 physicians, and treated well over one million sick and dying former slaves. The hospitals were short-lived, lasting from 1865 to 1870. Freedmen's Hospital in Washington, D.C. remained in operation until the late nineteenth century when it became part of Howard University.

In 1890, then president Benjamin Harrison voiced his support for a fund that would provide working people with security against incapacity caused by old age, accident or sickness.

The next major initiative came in the New Deal legislation of the 1930s, in the context of the Great Depression.

=== 1900s–1920s ===
In the first 10–15 years of the 20th century Progressivism was influencing both Europe and the United States. Many European countries were passing the first social welfare acts and forming the basis for compulsory government-run or voluntary subsidized health care programs. The United Kingdom passed the National Insurance Act of 1911 that provided medical care and replacement of some lost wages if a worker became ill. It did not, however, cover spouses or dependents. As early as the 1912 presidential election, former president Theodore Roosevelt vaguely called for the creation of a national health service in the 15th plank of his Progressive Party platform. However, neither Roosevelt nor his opponents discussed health care plans in detail, and Roosevelt lost the election to Woodrow Wilson. A unique American history of decentralization in government, limited government, and a tradition of classical liberalism are all possible explanations for the suspicion around the idea of compulsory government-run insurance. The American Medical Association (AMA) was also deeply and vocally opposed to the idea, which it labeled "socialized medicine". In addition, many urban US workers already had access to sickness insurance through employer-based sickness funds.

Early industrial sickness insurance purchased through employers was one influential economic origin of the current American health care system. These late-19th-century and early-20th-century sickness insurance schemes were generally inexpensive for workers: their small scale and local administration kept overhead low, and because the people who purchased insurance were all employees of the same company, that prevented people who were already ill from buying in. The presence of employer-based sickness funds may have contributed to why the idea of government-based insurance did not take hold in the United States at the same time that the United Kingdom and the rest of Europe was moving toward socialized schemes like the UK National Insurance Act of 1911. Thus, at the beginning of the 20th century, Americans were used to associating insurance with employers, which paved the way for the beginning of third-party health insurance in the 1930s.

=== 1930s–1950s ===
With the Great Depression, more and more people could not afford medical services. In 1933, Franklin D. Roosevelt asked Isidore Falk and Edgar Sydenstricter to help draft provisions to Roosevelt's pending Social Security legislation to include publicly funded health care programs. These reforms were attacked by the American Medical Association as well as state and local affiliates of the AMA as "compulsory health insurance." Roosevelt ended up removing the health care provisions from the bill in 1935. Fear of organized medicine's opposition to universal health care became standard for decades after the 1930s.

During this time, individual hospitals began offering their own insurance programs, the first of which became Blue Cross. Groups of hospitals as well as physician groups (i.e. Blue Shield) soon began selling group health insurance policies to employers, who then offered them to their employees and collected premiums. In the 1940s Congress passed legislation that supported the new third-party insurers. During World War II, industrialist Henry J. Kaiser used an arrangement in which doctors bypassed traditional fee-for-care and were contracted to meet all the medical needs for his employees on construction projects up and down the West coast. After the war ended, he opened the plan up to the public as a non-profit organization under the name Kaiser Permanente.

During World War II, the federal government introduced wages and price controls. In an effort to continue attracting and retaining employees without violating those controls, employers offered and sponsored health insurance to employees in lieu of gross pay. This was a beginning of the third-party paying system that began to replace direct out-of-pocket payments.

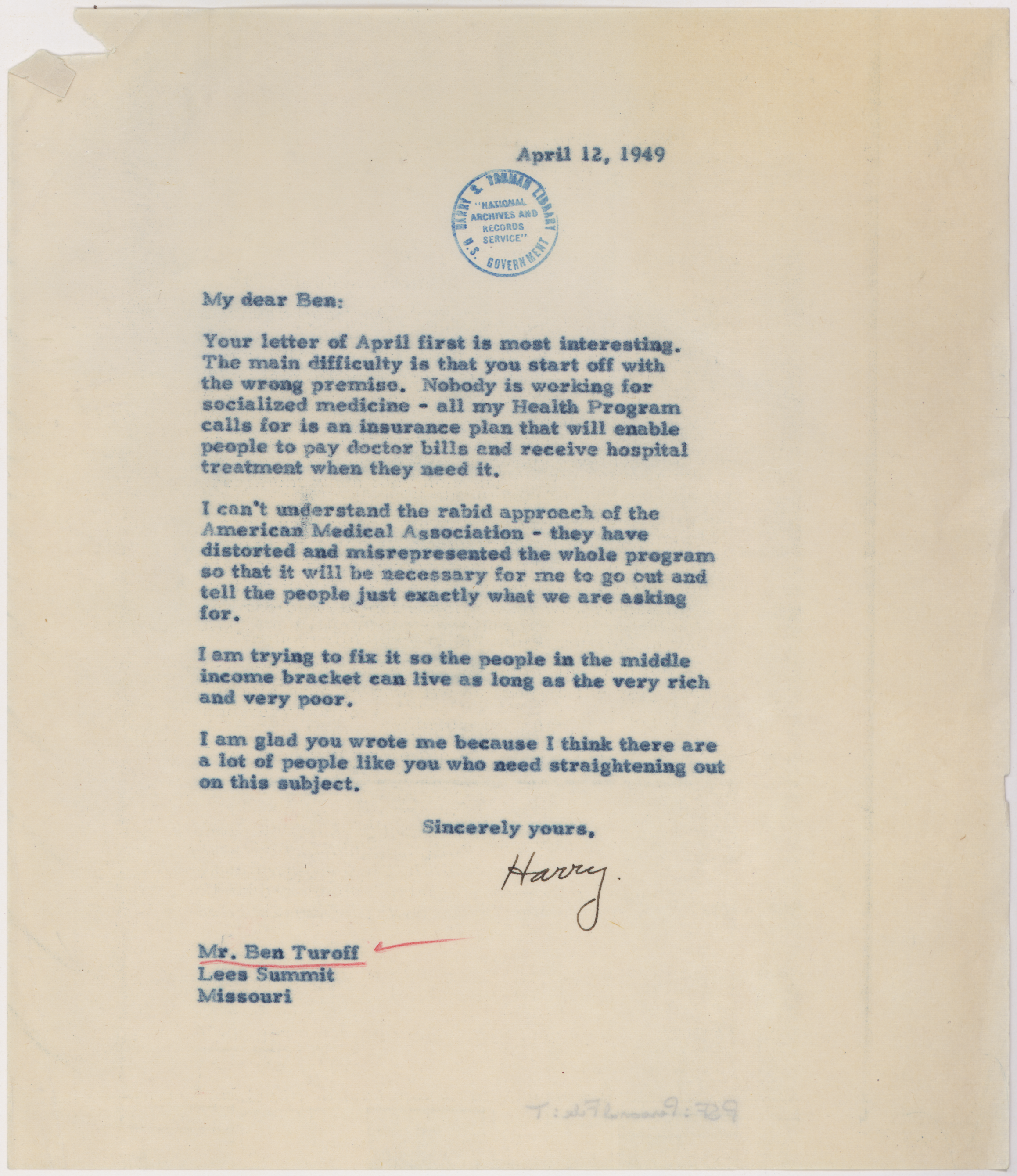
April 1949 letter written by Harry S. Truman defending his proposal for a national health insurance program

Following the war, Harry S. Truman became the first U.S. president to include national health insurance in his domestic agenda. As part of his Fair Deal program, Truman supported the Wagner-Murray-Dingell Bill, which included a system of government health insurance. The bill was supported by labor unions and opposed by the American Medical Association, who denounced the proposal as "socialized medicine". Though repeatedly introduced into Congress, the bill never advanced beyond the committee hearing stage.

In 1946, the National Mental Health Act was passed, as was the Hospital Survey and Construction Act, or Hill-Burton Act. In 1951 the IRS declared group premiums paid by employers as a tax-deductible business expense, which solidified the third-party insurance companies' place as primary providers of access to health care in the United States.

In his 1947 book "Where I Stand!", ex-governor of Minnesota and perennial Republican Party candidate Harold Stassen suggested that everyone on Social Security be provided with insurance and that the heaviest hospital and medical bills ought to be paid through a federal-state insurance approach. Henry A. Wallace, vice-president under Roosevelt from 1941 to 1945 and candidate of the left-wing Progressive Party in 1948, supported a national health insurance plan for all Americans.

=== 1960s–1980s ===
==== 1960s ====
In the Civil Rights era of the 1960s and early 1970s, public opinion shifted towards the problem of the uninsured, especially the elderly. Since care for the elderly would someday affect everyone, supporters of health care reform were able to avoid the worst fears of "socialized medicine," which was considered a dirty word for its association with communism. After Lyndon B. Johnson was elected president in 1964, the stage was set for the passage of Medicare and Medicaid in 1965. Johnson's plan was not without opposition, however. "Opponents, especially the AMA and insurance companies, opposed the Johnson administration's proposal on the grounds that it was compulsory, it represented socialized medicine, it would reduce the quality of care, and it was 'un-American.'" These views notwithstanding, the Medicare program was established when the Social Security Amendments of 1965 were signed into law on July 30, 1965, by President Lyndon B. Johnson. Medicare is a social insurance program administered by the United States government, providing health insurance coverage to people who are either age 65 and over, or who meet other special criteria.

==== 1970s ====
In 1970, three proposals for single-payer universal national health insurance financed by payroll taxes and general federal revenues were introduced in the U.S. Congress. In February 1970, Representative Martha Griffiths (D-MI) introduced a national health insurance bill—without any cost sharing—developed with the AFL–CIO. In April 1970, Senator Jacob Javits (R-NY) introduced a bill to extend Medicare to all—retaining existing Medicare cost sharing and coverage limits—developed after consultation with Governor Nelson Rockefeller (R-NY) and former Johnson administration HEW Secretary Wilbur Cohen. In August 1970, Senator Ted Kennedy (D-MA) introduced a bipartisan national health insurance bill—without any cost sharing—developed with the Committee for National Health Insurance founded by United Auto Workers (UAW) president Walter Reuther, with a corresponding bill introduced in the House the following month by Representative James Corman (D-CA). In September 1970, the Senate Labor and Public Welfare Committee held the first congressional hearings in twenty years on national health insurance.

During his time as Secretary of Health, Education, and Welfare, Elliot Richardson (R-MA) worked on a universal health program plan that could have been administrated through either the federal government or private insurers. Families would have shared costs with the program through income-based payments. The plan lost consideration when Nixon decided to replace Melvin Laird as Secretary of Defense with Richardson.

In January 1971, Kennedy began a decade as chairman of the Health subcommittee of the Senate Labor and Public Welfare Committee, and introduced a reconciled bipartisan Kennedy–Griffiths bill proposing universal national health insurance. In February 1971, President Richard Nixon proposed more limited health insurance reform—an employer mandate to offer private health insurance if employees volunteered to pay 25 percent of premiums, federalization of Medicaid for the poor with dependent minor children, merger of Medicare Parts A and B with elimination of the Medicare Part B $5.30 monthly premium, and support for health maintenance organizations (HMOs). In the same month, Representative Omar Burleson (D-TX) introduced a bipartisan bill supported by the Health Insurance Association of America that proposed voluntary health coverage through private insurers under federal government supervision, while keeping Medicare and Medicaid intact. In March 1971, Senators Hugh Scott (R-PA) and Charles Percy (R-IL) introduced a bill that proposed two health programs, an inpatient care program administered by the federal government, and a voluntary outpatient care program administered by private insurers under federal government supervision. Also in the same month, Senator Russell Long (D-LA) introduced a bipartisan bill that proposed universal catastrophic coverage for people under 65 insured by Social Security, as well as their families. The Health Insurance Act of 1971, a bill supported by conservative Republicans and southern Democrats was worked on by the American Medical Association.

Hearings on national health insurance were held by the House Ways and Means Committee and the Senate Finance Committee in 1971, but no bill had the support of committee chairmen Representative Wilbur Mills (D-AR) or Senator Long.

In October 1972, Nixon signed the Social Security Amendments of 1972 extending Medicare to those under 65 who have been severely disabled for over two years or have end stage renal disease (ESRD), and gradually raising the Medicare Part A payroll tax from 1.1% to 1.45% in 1986. In the 1972 presidential election, Nixon won re-election in a landslide over the only Democratic presidential nominee not endorsed by the AFL–CIO in its history, Senator George McGovern (D-SD), who was a cosponsor of the Kennedy-Griffiths bill, but did not make national health insurance a major issue in his campaign.

In October 1973, Long and Senator Abraham Ribicoff (D-CT) introduced a bipartisan bill for catastrophic health insurance coverage for workers financed by payroll taxes and for Medicare beneficiaries, and federalization of Medicaid with extension to the poor without dependent minor children. In February 1974, Nixon proposed more comprehensive health insurance reform—an employer mandate to offer private health insurance if employees volunteered to pay 25 percent of premiums, replacement of Medicaid by state-run health insurance plans available to all with income-based premiums and cost sharing, and replacement of Medicare with a new federal program that eliminated the limit on hospital days, added income-based out-of-pocket limits, and added outpatient prescription drug coverage. In April 1974, Kennedy and Mills introduced a bill for near-universal national health insurance with benefits identical to the expanded Nixon plan—but with mandatory participation by employers and employees through payroll taxes and with lower cost sharing—both plans were criticized by labor, consumer, and senior citizens organizations because of their substantial cost sharing.

In August 1974, after Nixon's resignation and President Gerald Ford's call for health insurance reform, Mills tried to advance a compromise based on Nixon's plan—but with mandatory participation by employers and employees through premiums to private health insurance companies and catastrophic health insurance coverage financed by payroll taxes—but gave up when unable to get more than a 13–12 majority of his committee to support his compromise plan. In December 1974, Mills resigned as chairman of the Ways and Means Committee and was succeeded by Representative Al Ullman (D-OR), who opposed payroll tax and general federal revenue financing of national health insurance.

In January 1975, in the midst of the worst recession in the four decades since the Great Depression, Ford said he would veto any health insurance reform, and Kennedy returned to sponsoring his original universal national health insurance bill. In April 1975, with one third of its sponsors gone after the November 1974 election, the AMA replaced its "Medicredit" plan with an employer mandate proposal similar to Nixon's 1974 plan. In January 1976, Ford proposed adding catastrophic coverage to Medicare, offset by increased cost sharing. In April 1976, Democratic presidential candidate Jimmy Carter proposed health care reform that included key features of Kennedy's universal national health insurance bill.

In December 1977, President Carter told Kennedy his bill must be changed to preserve a large role for private insurance companies, minimize federal spending (precluding payroll tax financing), and be phased-in so not to interfere with balancing the federal budget. Kennedy and organized labor compromised and made the requested changes, but broke with Carter in July 1978 when he would not commit to pursuing a single bill with a fixed schedule for phasing-in comprehensive coverage.

In May 1979, Kennedy proposed a new bipartisan universal national health insurance bill—choice of competing federally-regulated private health insurance plans with no cost sharing financed by income-based premiums via an employer mandate and individual mandate, replacement of Medicaid by government payment of premiums to private insurers, and enhancement of Medicare by adding prescription drug coverage and eliminating premiums and cost sharing. In June 1979, Carter proposed more limited health insurance reform—an employer mandate to provide catastrophic private health insurance plus coverage without cost sharing for pregnant women and infants, federalization of Medicaid with extension to the very poor without dependent minor children, and enhancement of Medicare by adding catastrophic coverage. In November 1979, Long led a bipartisan conservative majority of his Senate Finance Committee to support an employer mandate to provide catastrophic-only private health insurance and enhancement of Medicare by adding catastrophic coverage, but abandoned efforts in May 1980 due to budget constraints in the face of a deteriorating economy.

==== 1980s ====
The Consolidated Omnibus Budget Reconciliation Act of 1985 (COBRA) amended the Employee Retirement Income Security Act of 1974 (ERISA) to give some employees the ability to continue health insurance coverage after leaving employment.

=== Clinton initiative ===
Health care reform was a major concern of the Bill Clinton administration headed up by First Lady Hillary Clinton. The 1993 Clinton health care plan included mandatory enrollment in a health insurance plan, subsidies to guarantee affordability across all income ranges, and the establishment of health alliances in each state. Every citizen or permanent resident would thus be guaranteed medical care. The bill faced withering criticism by Republicans, led by William Kristol, who communicated his concern that a Democratic health care bill would "revive the reputation of... Democrats as the generous protector of middle-class interests. And it will at the same time strike a punishing blow against Republican claims to defend the middle class by restraining government." The bill was not enacted into law.

The "Health Security Express," a cross-country tour by multiple buses carrying supporters of President Clinton's national health care reform, started at the end of July 1994. During each stop, the bus riders would talk about their personal experiences, health care disasters and why they felt it was important for all Americans to have health insurance.

=== 2000–2008: Bush era debates ===
In 2000 the Health Insurance Association of America (HIAA) partnered with Families USA and the American Hospital Association (AHA) on a "strange bedfellows" proposal intended to seek common ground in expanding coverage for the uninsured.

In 2001, a Patients' Bill of Rights was debated in Congress, which would have provided patients with an explicit list of rights concerning their health care. This initiative was essentially taking some of ideas found in the Consumers' Bill of Rights and applying it to the field of health care. It was undertaken in an effort to ensure the quality of care of all patients by preserving the integrity of the processes that occur in the health care industry. Standardizing the nature of health care institutions in this manner proved rather provocative. In fact, many interest groups, including the American Medical Association (AMA) and the pharmaceutical industry came out vehemently against the congressional bill. Basically, providing emergency medical care to anyone, regardless of health insurance status, as well as the right of a patient to hold their health plan accountable for any and all harm done proved to be the biggest stumbling blocks for this bill. As a result of this intense opposition, the Patients' Bill of Rights initiative eventually failed to pass Congress in 2002.

As president, Bush signed into law the Medicare Prescription Drug, Improvement, and Modernization Act which included a prescription drug plan for elderly and disabled Americans.

During the 2004 presidential election, both the George Bush and John Kerry campaigns offered health care proposals. Bush's proposals for expanding health care coverage were more modest than those advanced by Senator Kerry. Several estimates were made comparing the cost and impact of the Bush and Kerry proposals. While the estimates varied, they all indicated that the increase in coverage and the funding requirements of the Bush plan would both be lower than those of the more comprehensive Kerry plan.

In 2006 the HIAA's successor organization, America's Health Insurance Plans (AHIP), issued another set of reform proposals.

In January 2007 Rep. John Conyers Jr. (D-MI) introduced The United States National Health Care Act (HR 676) in the House of Representatives. As of October 2008, HR 676 had 93 co-sponsors. Also in January 2007, Senator Ron Wyden introduced the Healthy Americans Act (S. 334) in the Senate.

Also in 2007, AHIP issued a proposal for guaranteeing access to coverage in the individual health insurance market and a proposal for improving the quality and safety of the U.S. health care system.

In December 2008, the Institute for America's Future, together with the chairman of the Ways and Means Health Subcommittee, Pete Stark, launched a proposal from Jacob Hacker, co-director of the U.C. Berkeley School of Law Center on Health, that in essence said that the government should offer a public health insurance plan to compete on a level playing field with private insurance plans. This was said to be the basis of the Obama/Biden plan. The argument is based on three basic points. Firstly, public plans success at managing cost control (Medicare medical spending rose 4.6% p.a. compared 7.3% for private health insurance on a like-for-like basis in the 10 years from 1997 to 2006). Secondly, public insurance has better payment and quality-improvement methods because of its large databases, new payment approaches, and care-coordination strategies. Thirdly, it can set a standard against which private plans must compete, which would help unite the public around the principle of broadly shared risk while building greater confidence in government in the long term.

Also in December 2008, America's Health Insurance Plans (AHIP) announced a set of proposals which included setting a national goal to reduce the projected growth in health care spending by 30%. AHIP said that if this goal were achieved, it would result in cumulative five-year savings of $500 billion. Among the proposals was the establishment of an independent comparative effectiveness entity that compares and evaluates the benefits, risks, and incremental costs of new drugs, devices, and biologics. An earlier "Technical Memo" published by AHIP in June 2008 had estimated that a package of reforms involving comparative effectiveness research, health information technology (HIT), medical liability reform, "pay-for-performance" and disease management and prevention could reduce U.S. national health expenditures "by as much as 9 percent by the year 2025, compared with current baseline trends."

=== Debate in the 2008 presidential election ===
Although both candidates had a health care system that revolved around private insurance markets with help from public insurance programs, both had different opinions on how this system should operate when put in place.

Senator John McCain proposed a plan that focused on making health care more affordable. The senator proposed to replace special tax breaks for persons with employer-based health care coverage with a universal system of tax credits. These credits, $2,500 for an individual and $5,000 for a family would be available to Americans regardless of income, employment or tax liability. In his plan, Senator McCain proposed the Guaranteed Access Plan which would provide federal assistance to the states to secure health insurance coverage through high-risk areas.

Senator McCain also proposed the idea of an open-market competition system. This would give families the opportunity to go across state lines and buy health plans, expanding personal options for affordable coverage and force the health insurance companies to compete over the consumers' money on an unprecedented scale.

Barack Obama called for universal health care. His health care plan called for the creation of a National Health Insurance Exchange that would include both private insurance plans and a Medicare-like government run option. Coverage would be guaranteed regardless of health status, and premiums would not vary based on health status either. It would have required parents to cover their children, but did not require adults to buy insurance.

The Philadelphia Inquirer reported that the two plans had different philosophical focuses. They described the purpose of the McCain plan as to "make insurance more affordable," while the purpose of the Obama plan was for "more people to have health insurance." The Des Moines Register characterized the plans similarly.

A poll released in early November 2008, found that voters supporting Obama listed health care as their second priority; voters supporting McCain listed it as fourth, tied with the war in Iraq. Affordability was the primary health care priority among both sets of voters. Obama voters were more likely than McCain voters to believe government can do much about health care costs.

=== 2009 reform debate ===
In March 2009 AHIP proposed a set of reforms intended to address waste and unsustainable growth in the current health care market. These reforms included:

- An individual insurance mandate with a financial penalty as a quid pro quo for guaranteed issue
- Updates to the Medicare physician fee schedule;
- Setting standards and expectations for safety and quality of diagnostics;
- Promoting care coordination and patient-centered care by designating a "medical home" that would replace fragmented care with a coordinated approach to care. Physicians would receive a periodic payment for a set of defined services, such as care coordination that integrates all treatment received by a patient throughout an illness or an acute event. This would promote ongoing comprehensive care management, optimizes patients' health status and assist patients in navigating the health care system
- Linking payment to quality, adherence to guidelines, achieving better clinical outcomes, giving better patient experience and lowering the total cost of care.
- Bundled payments (instead of individual billing) for the management of chronic conditions in which providers would have shared accountability and responsibility for the management of chronic conditions such as coronary artery disease, diabetes, chronic obstructive pulmonary disease and asthma, and similarly
- A fixed rate all-inclusive average payment for acute care episodes which tend to follow a pattern (even though some acute care episodes may cost more or less than this).

On May 5, 2009, US Senate Finance Committee held hearings on Health care reform. On the panel of the "invited stakeholder", no supporter of the Single-payer health care system was invited. The panel featured Republican senators and industry panelists who argued against any kind of expanded health care coverage. The preclusion of the single payer option from the discussion caused significant protest by doctors in the audience.

On June 15, 2009, the U.S. Congressional Budget Office (CBO) issued a preliminary analysis of the major provisions of the Affordable Health Choices Act. The CBO estimated the ten-year cost to the federal government of the major insurance-related provisions of the bill at approximately $1.0 trillion. Over the same ten-year period from 2010 to 2019, the CBO estimated that the bill would reduce the number of uninsured Americans by approximately 16 million. At about the same time, the Associated Press reported that the CBO had given Congressional officials an estimate of $1.6 trillion for the cost of a companion measure being developed by the Senate Finance Committee. In response to these estimates, the Senate Finance Committee delayed action on its bill and began work on reducing the cost of the proposal to $1.0 trillion, and the debate over the Affordable Health Choices act became more acrimonious. Congressional Democrats were surprised by the magnitude of the estimates, and the uncertainty created by the estimates has increased the confidence of Republicans who are critical of the Obama Administration's approach to health care.

However, in a June New York Times editorial, economist Paul Krugman argued that despite these estimates universal health coverage is still affordable. "The fundamental fact is that we can afford universal health insurance—even those high estimates were less than the $1.8 trillion cost of the Bush tax cuts."

In contrast to earlier advocacy of a publicly funded health care program, in August 2009 Obama administration officials announced they would support a health insurance cooperative in response to deep political unrest amongst Congressional Republicans and amongst citizens in town hall meetings held across America. However, in a June 2009 NBC News/Wall Street Journal survey, 76% said it was either "extremely" or "quite" important to "give people a choice of both a public plan administered by the federal government and a private plan for their health insurance."

During the summer of 2009, members of the "Tea Party" protested against proposed health care reforms. Former insurance PR executive Wendell Potter of the Center for Media and Democracy- whose funding comes from groups such as the Tides Foundation- argue that the hyperbole generated by this phenomenon is a form of corporate astroturfing, which he says that he used to write for CIGNA. Opponents of more government involvement, such as Phil Kerpen of Americans for Prosperity- whose funding comes mainly from the Koch Industries corporation counter-argue that those corporations oppose a public-plan, but some try to push for government actions that will unfairly benefit them, like employer mandates forcing private companies to buy health insurance. Journalist Ben Smith has referred to mid-2009 as "The Summer of Astroturf" given the organizing and coordinating efforts made by various groups on both pro- and anti-reform sides.

=== Healthcare debate, 2008–2010 ===
Healthcare reform was a major topic of discussion during the 2008 Democratic presidential primaries. As the race narrowed, attention focused on the plans presented by the two leading candidates, New York Senator Hillary Clinton and the eventual nominee, Illinois Senator Barack Obama. Each candidate proposed a plan to cover the approximately 45 million Americans estimated to not have health insurance at some point each year. Clinton's plan would have required all Americans obtain coverage (in effect, an individual health insurance mandate), while Obama's provided a subsidy but did not include a mandate. During the general election, Obama said that fixing healthcare would be one of his top four priorities if he won the presidency.

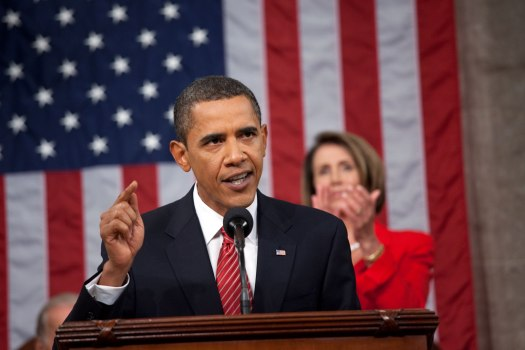
President Obama addressing Congress regarding healthcare reform, September 9, 2009.

After his inauguration, Obama announced to a joint session of Congress in February 2009 his intent to work with Congress to construct a plan for healthcare reform. By July, a series of bills were approved by committees within the House of Representatives. On the Senate side, from June through to September, the Senate Finance Committee held a series of 31 meetings to develop of a healthcare reform bill. This group – in particular, Senators Max Baucus (D-MT), Chuck Grassley (R-IA), Kent Conrad (D-ND), Olympia Snowe (R-ME), Jeff Bingaman (D-NM), and Mike Enzi (R-WY) – met for more than 60 hours, and the principles that they discussed, in conjunction with the other Committees, became the foundation of the Senate's healthcare reform bill.

With universal healthcare as one of the stated goals of the Obama Administration, Congressional Democrats and health policy experts like Jonathan Gruber and David Cutler argued that guaranteed issue would require both a community rating and an individual mandate to prevent either adverse selection and/or free riding from creating an insurance death spiral; they convinced Obama that this was necessary, persuading him to accept Congressional proposals that included a mandate. This approach was preferred because the President and Congressional leaders concluded that more liberal plans, such as Medicare-for-all, could not win filibuster-proof support in the Senate. By deliberately drawing on bipartisan ideas – the same basic outline was supported by former Senate Majority Leaders Howard Baker (R-TN), Bob Dole (R-KS), Tom Daschle (D-SD) and George Mitchell (D-ME) – the bill's drafters hoped to increase the chances of getting the necessary votes for passage.

However, following the adoption of an individual mandate as a central component of the proposed reforms by Democrats, Republicans began to oppose the mandate and threaten to filibuster any bills that contained it. Senate Minority Leader Mitch McConnell (R-KY), who lead the Republican Congressional strategy in responding to the bill, calculated that Republicans should not support the bill, and worked to keep party discipline and prevent defections:

It was absolutely critical that everybody be together because if the proponents of the bill were able to say it was bipartisan, it tended to convey to the public that this is O.K., they must have figured it out.

Republican Senators, including those who had supported previous bills with a similar mandate, began to describe the mandate as "unconstitutional". Writing in The New Yorker, Ezra Klein stated that "the end result was... a policy that once enjoyed broad support within the Republican Party suddenly faced unified opposition." The New York Times subsequently noted: "It can be difficult to remember now, given the ferocity with which many Republicans assail it as an attack on freedom, but the provision in President Obama's healthcare law requiring all Americans to buy health insurance has its roots in conservative thinking."

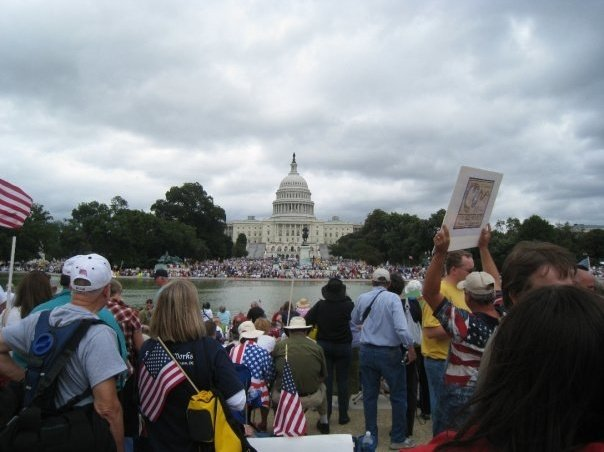
Tea Party protesters at the Taxpayer March on Washington, September 12, 2009.

The reform negotiations also attracted a great deal of attention from lobbyists, including deals among certain lobbies and the advocates of the law to win the support of groups who had opposed past reform efforts, such as in 1993. The Sunlight Foundation documented many of the reported ties between "the healthcare lobbyist complex" and politicians in both major parties.

During the August 2009 summer congressional recess, many members went back to their districts and entertained town hall meetings to solicit public opinion on the proposals. Over the recess, the Tea Party movement organized protests and many conservative groups and individuals targeted congressional town hall meetings to voice their opposition to the proposed reform bills. There were also many threats made against members of Congress over the course of the Congressional debate, and many were assigned extra protection.

To maintain the progress of the legislative process, when Congress returned from recess, in September 2009 President Obama delivered a speech to a joint session of Congress supporting the ongoing Congressional negotiations, to re-emphasize his commitment to reform and again outline his proposals. In it he acknowledged the polarization of the debate, and quoted a letter from the late-Senator Ted Kennedy urging on reform: "what we face is above all a moral issue; that at stake are not just the details of policy, but fundamental principles of social justice and the character of our country." On November 7, the House of Representatives passed the Affordable Health Care for America Act on a 220–215 vote and forwarded it to the Senate for passage.

==== Senate ====
The Senate began work on its own proposals while the House was still working on the Affordable Health Care for America Act. Instead, the Senate took up H.R. 3590, a bill regarding housing tax breaks for service members. As the United States Constitution requires all revenue-related bills to originate in the House, the Senate took up this bill since it was first passed by the House as a revenue-related modification to the Internal Revenue Code. The bill was then used as the Senate's vehicle for their healthcare reform proposal, completely revising the content of the bill. The bill as amended would ultimately incorporate elements of proposals that were reported favorably by the Senate Health and Finance committees.

With the Republican minority in the Senate vowing to filibuster any bill that they did not support, requiring a cloture vote to end debate, 60 votes would be necessary to get passage in the Senate. At the start of the 111th Congress, Democrats had only 58 votes; the Senate seat in Minnesota that would be won by Al Franken was still undergoing a recount, and Arlen Specter was still a Republican.

To reach 60 votes, negotiations were undertaken to satisfy the demands of moderate Democrats, and to try to bring aboard several Republican Senators; particular attention was given to Bob Bennett (R-UT), Chuck Grassley (R-IA), Mike Enzi (R-WY), and Olympia Snowe (R-ME). Negotiations continued even after July 7—when Al Franken was sworn into office, and by which time Arlen Specter had switched parties—because of disagreements over the substance of the bill, which was still being drafted in committee, and because moderate Democrats hoped to win bipartisan support. However, on August 25, before the bill could come up for a vote, Ted Kennedy—a long-time advocate for healthcare reform—died, depriving Democrats of their 60th vote. Before the seat was filled, attention was drawn to Senator Snowe because of her vote in favor of the draft bill in the Finance Committee on October 15, however she explicitly stated that this did not mean she would support the final bill. Paul Kirk was appointed as Senator Kennedy's temporary replacement on September 24.

Following the Finance Committee vote, negotiations turned to the demands of moderate Democrats to finalize their support, whose votes would be necessary to break the Republican filibuster. Majority Leader Harry Reid focused on satisfying the centrist members of the Democratic caucus until the hold-outs narrowed down to Connecticut's Joe Lieberman, an independent who caucused with Democrats, and Nebraska's Ben Nelson. Lieberman, despite intense negotiations in search of a compromise by Reid, refused to support a public option; a concession granted only after Lieberman agreed to commit to voting for the bill if the provision was not included, even though it had majority support in Congress. There was debate among supporters of the bill about the importance of the public option, although the vast majority of supporters concluded that it was a minor part of the reform overall, and that Congressional Democrats' fight for it won various concessions; this included conditional waivers allowing states to set up state-based public options, for example Vermont's Green Mountain Care.

Senate vote by state. Democratic yea Independent yea Republican nay Republican not voting

With every other Democrat now in favor and every other Republican now overtly opposed, the White House and Reid moved on to addressing Senator Nelson's concerns in order to win filibuster-proof support for the bill; they had by this point concluded that "it was a waste of time dealing with [Snowe]" because, after her vote for the draft bill in the Finance Committee, Snowe had come under intense pressure from the Republican Senate Leadership who opposed reform. (Snowe retired at the end of her term, citing partisanship and polarization). After a final 13-hour negotiation, Nelson's support for the bill was won after two concessions: a compromise on abortion, modifying the language of the bill "to give states the right to prohibit coverage of abortion within their own insurance exchanges," which would require consumers to pay for the procedure out-of-pocket if the state so decided; and an amendment to offer a higher rate of Medicaid reimbursement for Nebraska. The latter half of the compromise was derisively referred to as the "Cornhusker Kickback" and was later repealed by the subsequent reconciliation amendment bill.

On December 23, the Senate voted 60–39 to end debate on the bill: a cloture vote to end the filibuster by opponents. The bill then passed by a vote of 60–39 on December 24, 2009, with all Democrats and two independents voting for, and all Republicans voting against except one (Jim Bunning (R-KY), not voting). The bill was endorsed by the AMA and AARP.

Several weeks after the vote, on January 19, 2010, Massachusetts Republican Scott Brown was elected to the Senate in a special election to replace the late Ted Kennedy, having campaigned on giving the Republican minority the 41st vote needed to sustain filibusters, even signing autographs as "Scott 41." The special election had become significant to the reform debate because of its effects on the legislative process. The first was a psychological one: the symbolic importance of losing the traditionally Democratic ('blue') Massachusetts seat formerly held by Ted Kennedy, a staunch support of reform, made many Congressional Democrats concerned about the political cost of passing a bill. The second effect was more practical: the loss of the Democrat's supermajority complicated the legislative strategy of reform proponents.

==== House ====
House vote by congressional district. Democratic yea Democratic nay Republican nay No representative seated

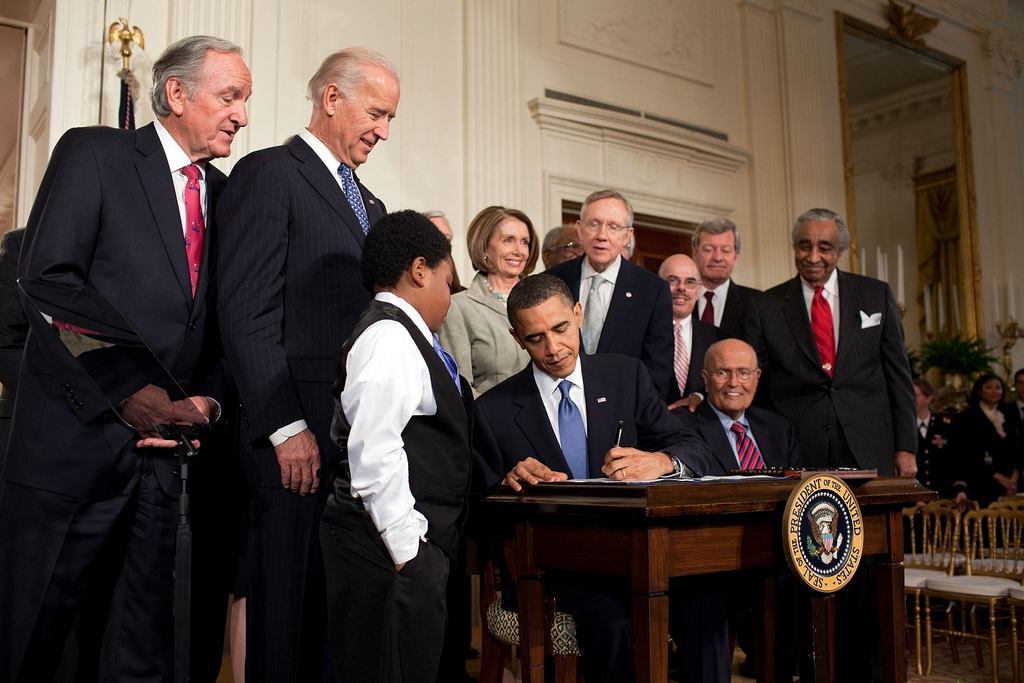
President Obama signing the Patient Protection and Affordable Care Act on March 23, 2010.

The election of Scott Brown meant Democrats could no longer break a filibuster in the Senate. In response, White House Chief of Staff Rahm Emanuel argued the Democrats should scale-back for a less ambitious bill; House Speaker Nancy Pelosi pushed back, dismissing Emanuel's scaled-down approach as "Kiddie Care." Obama also remained insistent on comprehensive reform, and the news that Anthem in California intended to raise premium rates for its patients by as much as 39% gave him a new line of argument to reassure nervous Democrats after Scott Brown's win. On February 22 Obama laid out a "Senate-leaning" proposal to consolidate the bills. He also held a meeting, on February 25, with leaders of both parties urging passage of a reform bill. The summit proved successful in shifting the political narrative away from the Massachusetts loss back to healthcare policy.

With Democrats having lost a filibuster-proof supermajority in the Senate, but having already passed the Senate bill with 60 votes on December 24, the most viable option for the proponents of comprehensive reform was for the House to abandon its own health reform bill, the Affordable Health Care for America Act, and pass the Senate's bill, The Patient Protection and Affordable Care Act, instead. Various health policy experts encouraged the House to pass the Senate version of the bill. However, House Democrats were not happy with the content of the Senate bill, and had expected to be able to negotiate changes in a House–Senate Conference before passing a final bill. With that option off the table, as any bill that emerged from Conference that differed from the Senate bill would have to be passed in the Senate over another Republican filibuster; most House Democrats agreed to pass the Senate bill on condition that it be amended by a subsequent bill. They drafted the Health Care and Education Reconciliation Act, which could be passed via the reconciliation process. Unlike rules under regular order, as per the Congressional Budget Act of 1974 reconciliation cannot be subject to a filibuster, which requires 60 votes to break, but the process is limited to budget changes; this is why the procedure was never able to be used to pass a comprehensive reform bill in the first place, such as the ACA, due to inherently non-budgetary regulations. Whereas the already passed Senate bill could not have been put through reconciliation, most of House Democrats' demands were budgetary: "these changes – higher subsidy levels, different kinds of taxes to pay for them, nixing the Nebraska Medicaid deal – mainly involve taxes and spending. In other words, they're exactly the kinds of policies that are well-suited for reconciliation."

The remaining obstacle was a pivotal group of anti-abortion Democrats, initially reluctant to support the bill, led by Congressman Bart Stupak. The group found the possibility of federal funding for abortion would be substantive enough to warrant opposition. The Senate bill had not included language that satisfied their abortion concerns, but they could not include additional such language in the reconciliation bill, as it would be outside the scope of the process with its budgetary limits. Instead, President Obama issued Executive Order 13535, reaffirming the principles in the Hyde Amendment. This concession won the support of Stupak and members of his group and assured passage of the bill. The House passed the Senate bill with a vote of 219 to 212 on March 21, 2010, with 34 Democrats and all 178 Republicans voting against it. The following day, Republicans introduced legislation to repeal the bill. Obama signed the ACA into law on March 23, 2010. The amendment bill, The Health Care and Education Reconciliation Act, was also passed by the House on March 21, then by the Senate via reconciliation on March 25, and finally signed by President Obama on March 30.

== State and city reform efforts ==
A few states have taken steps toward universal health care coverage, most notably Minnesota, Massachusetts, and Connecticut. Examples include the Massachusetts 2006 Health Reform Statute and Connecticut's SustiNet plan to provide health care to state residents. The influx of more than a quarter of a million newly insured residents has led to overcrowded waiting rooms and overworked primary-care physicians who were already in short supply in Massachusetts. Other states, while not attempting to insure all of their residents, cover large numbers of people by reimbursing hospitals and other health care providers using what is generally characterized as a charity care scheme; New Jersey is an example of a state that employs the latter strategy.

Several single payer referendums have been proposed at the state level, but so far all have failed to pass: California in 1994, Massachusetts in 2000, and Oregon in 2002. The state legislature of California twice passed SB 840, The Health Care for All Californians Act, a single-payer health care system. Both times, Governor Arnold Schwarzenegger (R) vetoed the bill, once in 2006 and again in 2008.

The percentage of residents that are uninsured varies from state to state. In 2008 Texas had the highest percentage of residents without health insurance, 24%. New Mexico had the second highest percentage of uninsured that year at 22%.

States play a variety of roles in the health care system including purchasers of health care and regulators of providers and health plans, which give them multiple opportunities to try to improve how it functions. While states are actively working to improve the system in a variety of ways, there remains room for them to do more.

One municipality, San Francisco, California, has established a program to provide health care to all uninsured residents (Healthy San Francisco).

In July 2009, Connecticut passed into law a plan called SustiNet, with the goal of achieving health care coverage of 98% of its residents by 2014. The SustiNet law establishes a nine-member board to recommend to the legislature, by January 1, 2011, the details of and implementation process for a self-insured health care plan called SustiNet. The recommendations must address (1) the phased-in offering of the SustiNet plan to state employees and retirees, HUSKY A and B beneficiaries, people without employer-sponsored insurance (ESI) or with unaffordable ESI, small and large employers, and others; (2) establishing an entity that can contract with insurers and health care providers, set reimbursement rates, develop medical homes for patients, and encourage the use of health information technology; (3) a model benefits package; and (4) public outreach and ways to identify uninsured citizens. The board must establish committees to make recommendations to it about health information technology, medical homes, clinical care and safety guidelines, and preventive care and improved health outcomes. The act also establishes an independent information clearinghouse to inform employers, consumers, and the public about SustiNet and private health care plans and creates task forces to address obesity, tobacco usage, and health care workforce issues. The effective date of the SustiNet law was July 1, 2009, for most provisions.

In May 2011, the state of Vermont became the first state to pass legislation establishing a single-payer health care system. The legislation, known as Act 48, establishes health care in the state as a "human right" and lays the responsibility on the state to provide a health care system which best meets the needs of the citizens of Vermont. In December 2014, the governor of the state of Vermont suspended plans to implement this single-payer system because of its cost.

== See also ==
- Healthcare reform in the United States
- Health economics
- Health insurance exchange
- Health insurance in the United States
- Health policy analysis
- Health care politics
- History of poverty in the United States
- History of public health in the United States
  - History of public health in Chicago
  - History of public health in New York City
- List of healthcare reform advocacy groups in the United States
- Medicare for All Act
- National health insurance
