= Health insurance mandate =

Requirement that people have health insurance

A health insurance mandate is either an employer or individual mandate to obtain private health insurance instead of (or in addition to) a national health insurance plan.

== Australia ==
Australia's national health insurance program is known as Medicare, and is financed by general taxation including a Medicare levy on earnings; use of Medicare is not compulsory and those who purchase private health insurance get a government-funded rebate on premiums. Individuals with high annual incomes (A$70,000 in the 2008 federal budget) who do not have specified levels of private hospital coverage are subject to an additional 1% Medicare Levy Surcharge. People of average incomes and below may be eligible for subsidies to buy private insurance, but face no penalty for not buying it. Private insurers must comply with guaranteed issue and community rating requirements, but may limit coverage of pre-existing ailments for up to one year to discourage adverse selection.

== Japan ==
Japan has a universal health care system that mandates all residents have health insurance, either at work or through a local community-based insurer, but does not impose penalties on individuals for not having insurance. The Japanese health ministry "tightly controls the price of health care down to the smallest detail. Every two years, the doctors and the health ministry negotiate a fixed price for every procedure and every drug. That helps keep premiums to around $280 a month for the average Japanese family." Insurance premiums are set by the government, with guaranteed issue and community rating. Insurers are not allowed to deny claims or coverage, or to make profits (net revenue is carried over to the next year, and if the carryover is large, the premium goes down). Around 10% evade the compulsory insurance premium; municipal governments do not issue them insurance cards, which providers require. Voluntary private insurance is available through several sources including employers and unions to cover expenditures not covered by statutory insurance, but this accounts for only about 2% of health care spending. In practice, doctors will not deny care to patients in the low-priced universal system because they make up the great majority of patients nationwide, and doctors would not be able to earn enough by serving only the small number of patients with private insurance. Total spending is around half the American level, and taxpayers subsidize the poor.

== Netherlands ==
The Netherlands has a health insurance mandate and allows for-profit companies to compete for minimum coverage insurance plans, though there are also mutual insurers, so the use of a commercial for-profit insurer is not compulsory. The government regulates the insurers and operates a risk equalization mechanism to subsidize insurers that insure relatively more expensive customers. Several features hold down the level of premiums which facilitates public compliance with the mandate. The cost of health care in the Netherlands is higher than the European average but is less than in the United States. Half of the cost of insurance for adults is paid for by an income-related tax with which goes towards a subsidy of private insurance via the risk reinsurance pool operated by the regulator. The government pays the entire cost for children. Forty percent of the population is eligible for a premium subsidy. About 1.5 percent of the legal population is estimated to be uninsured. The architects of the Dutch mandate did not envision any problem with non-compliance, the initial legislation created few effective sanctions if a person does not take out insurance or pay premiums, and the government is currently developing enforcement mechanisms.

== Switzerland ==
Switzerland's system is similar to that of the Netherlands, with regulated private insurance companies competing to provide the minimum necessary coverage to meet its mandate. Premiums are not linked to incomes, but the government provides subsidies to lower-class individuals to help them pay for their plans. About 40% of households received some kind of subsidy in 2004. Individuals are free to spend as much as they want for their plans and buy additional health services if desired. The system has virtual universal coverage, with about 99% of people having insurance. The laws behind the system were created in 1996. A recent issue in the country is their rising health care costs, which are higher than European averages. However, those rising costs are still a little less than the increases in the United States.

== United States ==
=== History ===
An individual mandate to purchase healthcare was initially proposed by The Heritage Foundation in 1989 as an alternative to single-payer health care. Stuart Butler, an early supporter of the individual mandate at The Heritage Foundation, wrote:

If a young man wrecks his Porsche and has not had the foresight to obtain insurance, we may commiserate, but society feels no obligation to repair his car. But health care is different. If a man is struck down by a heart attack in the street, Americans will care for him whether or not he has insurance.

The Heritage Foundation changed its position in 2011, calling the individual mandate unconstitutional.

From its inception, the idea of an individual mandate was championed by Republican politicians as a free-market approach to health care reform. Supporters included Charles Grassley, Mitt Romney, and John Chafee. The individual mandate was felt to resonate with conservative principles of individual responsibility, and conservative groups recognized that the healthcare market was unique.

In 1993, President Bill Clinton proposed a health care reform bill which included a mandate for employers to provide health insurance to all employees through a regulated marketplace of health maintenance organizations and an individual mandate. However, the Clinton plan failed amid concerns that it was overly complex or unrealistic, and in the face of an unprecedented barrage of negative advertising funded by politically conservative groups and the health insurance industry. At the time, Republican senators proposed a bill that would have required individuals, and not employers, to buy insurance, as an alternative to Clinton's plan.

Hillary Clinton's plan in 2008 also included an individual mandate.

=== Purpose ===
The need for mandates to carry coverage in a system structured as currently in the U.S. arises when there is an attempt to make health insurance available to all people, regardless of their pre-existing conditions. It is a tool used when insurance companies are required to offer insurance at the same rates to all those who want it, as they are under the Affordable Care Act.

The purpose of the federal or state mandates to carry coverage is to avoid free-rider problems and adverse selection problems in health insurance pools, so that there are not disproportionately many sicker people, or older people more likely to get sick, in the insurance pools. When there is excessive adverse selection, premiums can get high, or very high, and there can be so called "death spirals", where premiums rise to extreme levels, as only the sickest people are in the pools.

=== Massachusetts ===
An individual health-insurance mandate was initially enacted on a state level: the 2005 Massachusetts health care reform law. In 2006, Republican Mitt Romney, then governor of Massachusetts, signed an individual mandate into law with strong bipartisan support. In 2007, a Senate bill featuring a federal mandate, authored by Bob Bennett (R-UT) and Ron Wyden (D-OR), attracted substantial bipartisan support.

Before the law was passed, per capita health care costs in Massachusetts were the highest for any part of the country except D.C. From 2003 to 2008 (three years prior and two years after enactment), Massachusetts insurance premiums continued to outpace the rest of United States, however the rate of growth year to year for Massachusetts for that period slowed as a result of the law.

As of 2016, more than 97 percent of Massachusetts residents were insured, which made it the state with the lowest percentage of people without health insurance.

The Massachusetts state mandate to carry coverage was not stopped during the ACA, and for many years there was both a Federal and state mandate to carry coverage for MA residents. Post the stopping of the Federal mandate in 2018, the state mandate remains in place.

Some have criticized the state of Massachusetts related to the mandate because post-ACA, the state has kept Medicaid estate recovery regulations broader than the federally-required-minimum (long-term-care associated expenses) so that they recover from estates all medical expenses paid on behalf of Medicaid recipients age 55 and older, including those 55 and older who get the ACA's expanded Medicaid.

The criticism is that people affected are subject to having their estates need to pay back full medical expenses, not even just some kind of premium equivalent. The people affected are subject to the mandate, and would have to pay a penalty for declining the Medicaid or ACA expanded Medicaid. What could be considered unfair is that, although the mandate is for the stated purpose of allowing risk to be pooled effectively for insurance, the people subject to estate recovery of all medical expenses in fact have no risk pooling for themselves, and have to potentially pay back all medical bills paid for them.

=== Other state individual mandates ===
New Jersey and the District of Columbia adopted an individual healthcare insurance mandate effective January 1, 2019, and California, Rhode Island, and Vermont have done so effective January 1, 2020. Other states provide community rating and guaranteed issue without mandates.

=== Affordable Care Act ===
Romney's success in installing an individual mandate in Massachusetts was at first lauded by Republicans. During Romney's 2008 Presidential campaign, Sen. Jim DeMint (R-SC) praised Romney's ability to "take some good conservative ideas, like private health insurance, and apply them to the need to have everyone insured." Romney himself said of the individual mandate: "I'm proud of what we've done. If Massachusetts succeeds in implementing it, then that will be the model for the nation." In the 2008 Presidential campaign Senator Barack Obama campaigned against an individual mandate. Obama attacked Hillary Clinton and John Edwards for their support of the individual mandate during primary debates and in television ads.

However, following the adoption of an individual mandate as a central component of President Obama's Patient Protection and Affordable Care Act in 2009, Republicans began to oppose the mandate. In 2009, every Republican Senator (including Bennett, who had co-written the 2007 bill featuring a mandate) voted to describe the mandate as "unconstitutional". (Explaining his opposition, Bennett later said: "I didn't focus on the particulars of the amendment as closely as I should have, and probably would have voted the other way if I had understood that the individual mandate was at its core. I just wanted to express my opposition to the Obama proposal at every opportunity.") The New York Times wrote: "It can be difficult to remember now, given the ferocity with which many Republicans assail it as an attack on freedom, but the provision in President Obama's health care law requiring all Americans to buy health insurance has its roots in conservative thinking."

Other Republican politicians who had previously supported individual mandates, including Romney and Orrin Hatch, similarly emerged as vocal critics of the mandate in Obama's legislation. Writing in The New Yorker, Ezra Klein stated that "the end result was... a policy that once enjoyed broad support within the Republican Party suddenly faced unified opposition."

The Affordable Care Act signed in 2010 by Obama included an individual mandate to take effect in 2014.

On August 30, 2013, final regulations for the individual mandate were published in the Federal Register (78 FR 53646), with minor corrections published December 26, 2013 (78 FR 78256).

By the Tax Cuts and Jobs Act of 2017, the Affordable Care Act's individual mandate is set at $0 effective 2019. The act does not repeal the individual mandate as this was ruled to violate the reconciliation process.

On December 14, 2018, District Judge Reed O'Connor of Texas ruled that the Obamacare individual mandate was unconstitutional because [the] "Individual Mandate can no longer be fairly read as an exercise of Congress's Tax Power and is still impermissible under the Interstate Commerce Clause—meaning the Individual Mandate is unconstitutional." California and several other states led the appeal of the case to the Fifth Circuit Court. The Fifth Circuit affirmed in part with O'Connor's opinion on the unconstitutionality of the ACA without the individual mandate in December 2019. The case was raised to the Supreme Court to be heard as California v. Texas during the court's 2020–21 term; in a 7–2 decision issued on June 17, 2021, the Court ruled that Texas and other states that initially challenged the individual mandate did not have standing, as they had not shown past or future injury related to the provision. The Supreme Court, otherwise, did not rule on the constitutionality of the individual mandate in this case.

=== Constitutional challenges ===
The ACA mandate was challenged in federal courts by Republican state attorneys general. On June 28, 2012, the U.S. Supreme Court upheld the provision as constitutional. Chief Justice John Roberts delivered the majority opinion in National Federation of Independent Business v. Sebelius, which upheld the Patient Protection and Affordable Care Act by a 5–4 vote. The Court ruled that although the "individual mandate" component of the act was not constitutional under the Commerce Clause, it was reasonably construed as a tax and was therefore valid under the Congressional authority to "lay and collect taxes." In a September 2010 working paper, a forthcoming article in the New York University Journal of Law & Liberty, and a lecture given at NYU, Randy Barnett of Georgetown University Law Center argues that the mandate is unconstitutional under the doctrine of the Commerce and Necessary and Proper Clauses, and that enforcing it is equivalent to "commandeering the people." Penalizing inaction, he argues, is only defensible when a fundamental duty of a person has been established. He also asserted that Congress fails to enforce the mandate under its taxing power because the penalty is not revenue-generating according to the Act itself.

=== Criticism of individual mandate ===
Insurance lobbyists (AHIP) in the United States advocate that the mandate is necessary to support guaranteed issue and community rating, which limit underwriting by insurers; insurers propose that the mandate is intended to prevent adverse selection by ensuring healthy individuals purchase insurance and thus broaden the risk pool. The mandate has been considered at the heart of health care reform proposals in the United States and "absolutely necessary" pre-condition to universal health care, since any non-compulsory reform would fail to expand coverage. A 2008 AHIP/Kaiser forum cited Dutch and Swiss mandates (see above); AHIP's published report does not mention penalties but says Switzerland "enforces the rules in many ways..." In October 2009, Kaiser Health News reported that "The insurance industry is clearly worried about the mandate being defanged."

Some studies of empirical evidence suggest that the threat of adverse selection is exaggerated, and that risk aversion and propitious selection may balance it. For example, several US states have guaranteed issue and limits on rating, but only Massachusetts has an individual mandate; similarly, although Japan has a nominal mandate, around 10% of individuals do not comply, and there is no penalty (they simply remain uninsured - see above). Without mandates, for-profit insurers have necessarily relied on risk aversion to charge premiums over expected risks, but have been constrained by what customers are willing to pay; mandates eliminate that constraint, allowing insurers to charge more. Governments that impose a mandate must subsidize those who cannot afford it, thus shifting the cost onto taxpayers.

University of Chicago economist Casey B. Mulligan argues that, despite adverse selection, an individual mandate is unnecessary and reducing efficiency as long as insurance is subsidized enough. "Consumers who turn down the government aid by failing, say, to buy a subsidized plan are owed gratitude by us Federal taxpayers. The ACA did the opposite with its 'individual mandate'...." A cost-benefit analysis confirming Mulligan's argument appeared in the 2019 Economic Report of the President, which also concludes that adverse selection is not sufficient economic justification for prohibiting unsubsidized plans that exclude "essential benefits" such as coverage for maternity or mental health.

The insurance mandate faced opposition across the political spectrum, from left-leaning groups such as the Green Party and other advocates of single-payer healthcare to right-leaning groups, such as The Heritage Foundation, FreedomWorks, and the Cato Institute and some members of the U.S. Senate and House of Representatives.

Opponents such as Michael Cannon, Director of Health Policy Studies at the Cato Institute, make a philosophical argument that people should have the right to live without government social interference as a matter of individual liberty. He has stated that federal, state, and local governments are not willing or able to raise the necessary funds to effectively subsidize people who cannot currently afford insurance. He has also stated that the costs of increasing coverage are far higher than other reforms, such as reducing the number of errors and accidents in treatment, which would accomplish as much or more benefit to society.

Public opinion polls from 2009 through 2012 continued to find that most Americans rejected penalizing people for not buying health insurance.

== Employer mandates ==
In the United States, the Patient Protection and Affordable Care Act (PPACA) includes both employer and individual mandates that take effect in 2014. The PPACA's employer mandate requires that all businesses with 50 or more full-time employees provide minimum affordable health insurance to at least 95% of their full-time employees and dependents up to age 26, or pay a fee by 2016. In the two largest EU countries, France and Germany, Statutory Health Insurance (SHI) mandates employers and employees pay into statutory sickness funds. In France, private health insurance (PHI) is voluntary and used to increase the reimbursement rate from the statutory sickness system. The same applies in Germany where it is also possible to opt out of SHI if you are a very high earner and into a PHI but if a person has reached the age of 55 and is in the PHI sector he or she must remain covered by PHI and cannot opt back into SHI. Persons who are unemployed can usually continue their payments through social insurance and the very poor receive support from the government to be insured. Most workers are insured through compulsory membership of "sickness funds" that are non-profit entities established originally by trades unions and now given statutory status. In Germany and France, as is the case with most European health care finance, the personal contribution to health care financing varies according to a person's income level and not according to their health status. Only 0.2% of Germans are uninsured, mainly self-employed, rich and poor, and persons who have failed to pay contributions to the statutory insurance or premiums to the private health insurance. Between 1990 and 2000 the share of French SHI income coming directly from employees via salaries fell from around 30% to just 3% and employer direct contributions also fell. The difference was made up by a rise in income from government taxation, thus widening the mandatory contribution base to the health insurance system.

== See also ==
- Health care reform
- Health advocate
- Health economics
- Health insurance
- Health Insurance Innovations
- Individual shared responsibility provision
- Medical necessity
