= Open Referral =

Open Referral in private medical insurance refers to the practice of a General Practitioner referring patients to any consultant with a particular speciality for treatment rather than explicitly naming a specific consultant. The insurance company will then choose a consultant that has the speciality specified from an approved list that they maintain or offer a choice of two or three consultants from this list for the patient to decide between.

== History ==
Open Referral was first introduced on a widespread scale in the UK by Bupa, the largest private medical insurer by subscription income, who adopted this system for schemes offered to their large corporate clients from 1 January 2012. Several other large insurance companies have since introduced similar schemes including Axa PPP and Aviva, the second and third largest private medical insurers respectively. Larger insurance companies can use such a scheme to negotiate discounts with consultants who wish to be included on their approved list, based on the significant volume of purchase they are making. BUPA, AXA PPP and Aviva account for over 78% of the total private medical insurance market in the UK between them, as measured by subscription income. Not being included on the lists of these insurance companies could result in a "significant shortfall in demand" for healthcare providers according to Laing's Healthcare Market Review 2010-11.

== Debate ==
Proponents of Open Referral cite as advantages of the scheme that data they have collected from previous referrals makes them better placed to find a suitable private consultants compared to many GPs. Insurance company Simplyhealth stated that “Open referral recognises that relationships between patients and GPs are different from five or 10 years ago. In the old days, GPs knew all consultants in their area, but now they don’t and they also don’t have such strong relationships with patients.” Using a consultant from an approved list also ensures the cost of treatment is fully covered by the insurance, whereas a GP specified or patient chosen consultant's fee might be higher than the coverage provided by insurance, leaving the patient to make up the shortfall. Insurance companies that provide a choice of consultants also cite increased choice as compared to a single suggestion that may have been offered by a GP.

Doctors have opposed Bupa's open referral system, arguing that the system reduces patient choice. Patients that have previously received treatment from a particular consultant may not be able to use them again if they don't appear on the approved list after moving to a product that uses Open Referral. Some providers cite the removal of consultant choice from the GP and patient as removing one of the primary advantages that private medical insurance provides over public healthcare.

In 2012, a survey carried out by GFKNOP found that 87% of consultants believed that patients would receive worse treatment as a result of Open Referral. A survey carried out by the Office of Fair Trading found that 7% of GPs saw their role as "making a definite recommendation for a particular choice of facility and/or consultant".
