= Medical underwriting =

Health insurance term

Medical underwriting is a health insurance term referring to the use of medical or health information in the evaluation of an applicant for coverage, typically for life or health insurance. As part of the underwriting process, an individual's health information may be used in making two decisions: whether to offer or deny coverage and what premium rate to set for the policy. The two most common methods of medical underwriting are known as moratorium underwriting, a relatively simple process, and full medical underwriting, a more in-depth analysis of a client's health information. The use of medical underwriting may be restricted by law in certain insurance markets. If allowed, the criteria used should be objective, clearly related to the likely cost of providing coverage, practical to administer, consistent with applicable law, and designed to protect the long-term viability of the insurance system.

It is the process in which an underwriter considers the health conditions of the person who is applying for the insurance, keeping in mind certain factors like health condition, age, nature of work, and geographical zone. After looking at all the factors, an underwriter suggests whether a policy should be given to the person and at what price, or premium.

== Health insurance ==
Underwriting is the process that a health insurer uses to weigh potential health risks in its pool of insured people against potential costs of providing coverage.

To search the medical underwriting, an insurer asks people who apply for coverage (typically people applying for individual or family coverage) about pre-existing medical conditions. In most US states, insurance companies are allowed to ask questions about a person's medical history to decide whom to offer coverage, whom to deny and if additional charges should apply to individually-purchased coverage.

While most discussions of medical underwriting in health insurance are about medical expense insurance, similar considerations apply for other forms of individually-purchased health insurance, such as disability income and longterm care insurance.

=== Purpose ===
From the insurers' point of view, medical underwriting is necessary to prevent people from purchasing health insurance coverage only when they are sick, pregnant or need medical care. Adverse selection is a system that attracts high-users and discourages low-users from participating. Proponents of underwriting believe that if given the ability to purchase coverage without regard for pre-existing medical conditions (no underwriting), people would wait to purchase health insurance until they got sick or needed medical care. Waiting to obtain health insurance coverage until one needs coverage then creates a pool of insureds with "high use," which then increases the premiums that insurance companies must charge to pay for the claims incurred. In turn, high premiums further discourage healthy people from obtaining coverage, particularly when they realize that they will be able to obtain coverage when they need medical care.

=== Effects ===
Proponents of medical underwriting thus argue that it ensures that individual health insurance premiums are kept as low as possible. Critics of medical underwriting believe that it unfairly prevents people with relatively minor and treatable pre-existing conditions from obtaining health insurance. Diseases that can make an individual uninsurable include serious conditions, such as arthritis, cancer, and heart disease but also such common ailments as acne, being 20 lb. over or under the ideal weight, and old sports injuries. An estimated 5 million of those without health insurance are considered "uninsurable" because of pre-existing conditions.

One large industry survey, from 2004, found that roughly 13% of those who applied for individual health insurance were denied coverage after undergoing medical underwriting. Declination rates increased significantly with age, rising from 5% for individuals 18 and under to just under a third for individuals to 64. The same study found that among those who received offers for coverage, 76% received offers at standard rates 22% were quoted higher rates. The frequency of increased premiums also increased with age so for applicants over 40, roughly half were affected by medical underwriting, either in the form of denial or increased premiums. The study did not address how many applicants offered coverage at higher premiums decided to decline the policy. A study conducted by the Commonwealth Fund in 2001 found that, among those 19 to 64 who sought individual health insurance during the previous three years, the majority found it expensive, and less than a third ended up purchasing insurance. However, the study did not distinguish between consumers who were quoted increased rates by medical underwriting and those who qualified for standard or preferred premiums.

Measuring the percentage of applicants who were denied coverage does not capture any effect that occurs before an application is submitted. If individuals with serious health conditions never apply because they expect that they will be denied coverage, they will not show up in the declination rate. Conversely, if they apply with multiple insurers in hopes of finding one that will issue them a policy, they will be overrepresented in the declination rate. The 2001 Commonwealth Fund study found that a majority of adults reported that it was at least somewhat difficult to find an affordable health insurance policy. Among adults over 30, the percentage reporting difficulty did not vary significantly by age. Those with health problems were somewhat more likely to report having difficulty obtaining affordable health insurance (77% versus 64% of those in good health).

Some American states have made medical underwriting illegal as a prerequisite for health coverage, which means anyone who asks for health insurance and pays for it will get it. States that have outlawed medical underwriting include New York, New Jersey, Maine, Massachusetts, and Vermont, which also have the highest premiums for individual health insurance.

=== Renewals ===
Prior to the passage of the Affordable Care Act in 2010, health insurance was primarily regulated by the states. Some states mandated individual health insurance policies as "guaranteed renewable:" once a policy had been issued, the policyholder could keep it forever regardless of medical conditions as long as the required premiums were paid. There had been instances in which insurers increased premiums at annual renewals based on an individual's claim history or changes in their health status. That was possible when coverage was marketed to individuals by discretionary group trusts, escaping some states' rules governing the individual health insurance market. The insurer that was first identified by The Wall Street Journal as reunderwriting policyholders has since publicly stated it will discontinue the practice.

However, in most cases, an insurer's ability to "re-underwrite" an existing guaranteed renewable policy is limited by contract provisions and the Affordable Care Act (previously by state law). Even so, premiums fluctuated significantly for existing policies if the average health of the policyholders with a particular product deteriorated, as often happened when rising premiums drove healthier individuals (who were able to buy other policies on more favorable terms) out of the product, leaving those who were relatively less healthy. One factor that drove that is the increase in costs, as individuals who initially pass underwriting develop health problems. In general, claim costs rose significantly over the first five years that an individual health insurance policy is in force.

Several solutions were proposed for the "closed block" problem, including requiring insurers to "pre-fund" for cost increases over the lifetime of a product, providing cross-subsidies between blocks of products by pooling products across durations, providing cross-subsidies by placing limits on the allowed variation in premiums between products, or creating state-sponsored risk pools for individuals trapped in a closed block. The American Academy of Actuaries performed a study of the proposed solutions for the National Association of Insurance Commissioners and modeled the likely impact of each. All of the solutions would increase the initial cost of a new policy and reduce cost increases over time.

=== Rescissions ===
Insurers have the right to cancel individually purchased insurance if the insurer finds that the applicant provided incomplete or inaccurate information on the application, thereby affecting the medical underwriting process. The practice, called rescission, protects insurers from intentional fraud and affects only about 1% of individual policyholders but appears to be on the increase. Rescission practices by several large insurers have attracted media attention, class-action lawsuits, and regulatory attention in several states. In 2007, California passed legislation to tighten the rules governing rescissions. In December 2007, a California appeals court ruled that a health insurer could not rescind coverage without showing that either the policyholder willfully misrepresented health or that the insurer had investigated the application before issuing coverage.

== Life insurance underwriting ==
A distinction between underwriting of individually purchased life insurance and the underwriting of health insurance is generally recognized in US state-specific regulation of insurance. The general legal posture is for states to view life insurance as less of a necessity than health coverage.

== Moratorium underwriting ==
Moratorium underwriting is an alternative method of health insurance which primarily allows for applicants to receive cover without disclosing their entire medical history. Instead, individuals will typically have any pre-existing medical conditions excluded if those have developed within the past five years. If related symptoms occur within a set period of time, then this will affect the final policy.

Moratorium underwriting is, therefore, best suited for healthy individuals who don't foresee any medical difficulties developing.

== Full medical underwriting (FMU) ==
Full medical underwriting requires that applicants disclose their entire medical histories to the insurer. This then allows the insurer to provide the applicants with lists of specific exclusions based on their disclosed pre-existing medical conditions.

== See also ==
- Body mass index (BMI)
- Rohrer's index
