= Nyman's model =

Theory of demand for health insurance

Nyman's model offers an alternative theory of the demand for private health insurance. The theory was developed in the 1990s by John A. Nyman who is an economist and professor at the University of Minnesota.

Conventional theory holds that health insurance is purchased because consumers are averse to risk, and insurance provides a vehicle for converting an uncertain loss into a certain one. Conventional theory also suggests that all moral hazard, that is, all the additional healthcare that is purchased when insured, is inefficient. It is inefficient because the cost of producing it exceeds its value to consumers.

Nyman's model holds that insurance is purchased in order to obtain an income transfer from the insurer in the event of illness. This income transfer allows for the purchase of additional healthcare when ill and represents moral hazard that is efficient, that is, additional healthcare whose value to consumers exceeds its costs. Health insurance is also purchased because this additional income often allows consumers to gain access to valuable healthcare that they would not otherwise be able to afford. This access value of health insurance is an important reason for the demand for health insurance.

== Definition ==
Nyman's model suggests that health insurance is purchased because consumers want to transfer income from their healthy state to their ill state, where it is more valuable to them. It is more valuable because healthcare expenses have suddenly been added to the consumer's budget, making all income dearer. Insurance takes advantage of the fact that not all purchasers of insurance become ill during the same contract year. For example, suppose a certain healthcare procedure costs $100,000, but each person has only a 1 in 50,000 chance of becoming ill and needing that procedure in a given year. The consumer is therefore able to purchase full insurance coverage for that procedure for only $2, or a little more, because for every 1 person who becomes ill, 49,999 other consumers pay $2 into the insurance pool and remain healthy. Thus, insurance acts both to transfer $2 of the consumer's income to the consumer's ill state, and also to augment that income by [$2 x 49,999 =] $99,998 in that state from consumers who remain healthy.

The insurer transfers income from the healthy to the ill. This income transfer is typically accomplished by the insurer paying for the insured patient's care. This money comes out of the pool of premiums that are paid to the insurer by both those who remain healthy and those who become ill. Moral hazard, the additional healthcare consumed because of insurance, can be decomposed into an efficient (welfare increasing) portion and an inefficient (welfare decreasing) one, based on what the insured patient would have done with the income if they had been written a cashier's check for the insurance spending, instead of the insurer purchasing the healthcare for them. The portion of moral hazard that the insured patient would have purchased with the additional income represents the efficient portion of moral hazard. The portion of moral hazard that the insured consumer would not have purchased with the additional income represents the inefficient portion of moral hazard.

=== Examples ===
==== Example of efficient moral hazard ====
Assume that Elizabeth contracts breast cancer. Without insurance, assume she would purchase a mastectomy for $20,000. With insurance that pays for all her care, assume she would purchase a mastectomy for $20,000, a breast reconstruction for $20,000, and 2 extra days in the hospital to recover for $4,000. Moral hazard is represented by the $20,000 breast reconstruction and the $4,000 for 2 extra days in the hospital. To determine whether this moral hazard spending is efficient or inefficient, it would have been necessary to present Elizabeth with a cashier's check at diagnosis for the amount of income that came from the insurance pool to pay for her care ($20,000 + $20,000 + $4,000 = $44,000) and see what she would purchase. Assume that with her original income (minus the premium paid) plus $44,000, she would have purchased the $20,000 mastectomy and the $20,000 breast reconstruction, but not the 2 extra days in the hospital for $4,000. Because she could have purchased anything of her choosing with the additional $44,000 and chose to purchase the $20,000 breast reconstruction, we know that this portion of moral hazard is efficient. That is, it was worth at least as much to her as the $20,000 that it cost to produce it. For that reason, this purchase also increases the welfare of society. Because she did not purchase the 2 extra days in the hospital for $4,000, we know that this portion of moral hazard is inefficient and costs more than it was worth to Elizabeth. It was only purchased with her original insurance because the insurer was paying for all her care. Such a purchase decreases the welfare of society.

The inefficient portion of moral hazard can be seen as representing a transaction cost of using a price reduction (if insurance pays for all care, the price of healthcare to the insured consumer has dropped to $0) to transfer income to Elizabeth. That same amount of income could have been transferred by a cashier's check, but it would probably require even greater resource costs because of the need to monitor for insurance fraud and to write complex legal contracts. If using a price reduction is the lowest cost method for transferring income to the consumer's ill state, then this transaction cost can be ignored.

==== Example of the access value of insurance ====
Ganesha contracts a liver disease that his doctor tells him requires a liver transplant costing $300,000. Without insurance, Ganesha cannot afford to purchase this procedure, even if he were able to liquidate all the assets he owns. Also, because the procedure is risky and because the repayment of a loan is therefore also risky, he is not able to borrow the money he needs from any lender. Moreover, because of the urgency of the situation, he does not have the time or the income necessary to save the additional money he needs. However, Ganesha could have purchased an insurance policy that would cover the cost of his care and gain access to the liver transplant. Because the probability of needing a liver transplant is only 1 in 75,000 a year, Ganesha is able to gain access to the procedure by buying an insurance policy that costs only [$300,000/75,000 =] $4, or a little more. This is because, although he pays only $4, there are 74,999 other purchasers of insurance who each paid $4 into the insurance pool and who contribute altogether an additional $299,996. These consumers pay into the insurance pool, but because they have not contracted this liver disease, they do not incur any of the costs of the liver transplant procedure. That is, even though the cost of this procedure is completely covered by insurance and thus they face a zero price for the procedure, none of these healthy individuals would voluntarily opt to undergo a dangerous and painful procedure like a liver transplant unnecessarily. Through insurance, Ganesha gains access to that procedure.

== Features of Nyman's model ==
The following are some primary features of the model:

- Income transfer and access to care: In conventional models, people buy health insurance to avoid risk. In Nyman's model, the motivation for the purchase of insurance is the desire for an income transfer in the event of illness because income is more valuable when ill. When a person becomes sick, they may be unable to afford the care they need if the procedure is very expensive. Nevertheless, by pooling premiums from many healthy individuals, insurance can allow them to gain access to the expensive but necessary care that they otherwise would not be able to afford.
- Efficient vs inefficient moral hazard: According to conventional theory, all of the additional healthcare received when insured is inefficient and considered wasteful spending. According to Nyman's model, although a portion of moral hazard may still be inefficient, a portion is efficient and represents an important reason for purchasing insurance. That is, Nyman's model makes a distinction between efficient moral hazard and inefficient moral hazard:
  - Efficient moral hazard: This is the portion of additional healthcare consumed by a person with insurance that they would have purchased if they had received the equivalent income from the insurer as a direct cash payment. This portion is efficient because they could have chosen to purchase anything with that income and chose to purchase healthcare.
  - Inefficient moral hazard: This is the portion of the additional healthcare that is consumed only because a price reduction was used to transfer income from the insurance pool to the ill consumer. This healthcare would not have been purchased if the person had received this income as a cash transfer. This portion of moral hazard spending is inefficient because it represents spending that is not worth its cost to the consumer.
- Uncertainty as a vehicle for augmenting income: Under conventional theory, the avoidance of uncertainty is the motivator for purchasing insurance. Under Nyman's model, uncertainty is simply the reason why a consumer can pay a premium when healthy and receive a multiple of that premium as an income transfer if ill. That is, rather than a negative factor to be avoided, uncertainty is a mechanical or deterministic factor that allows for the augmentation of the income transfer in the ill state.

== See also ==
- Healthcare in the United States
- Health insurance in the United States
- Health insurance
