= Death spiral (insurance) =

Insurance market condition

Death spiral is a condition where the structure of insurance plans leads to premiums rapidly increasing as a result of changes in the covered population. It is the result of adverse selection in insurance policies in which lower risk policy holders choose to change policies or be uninsured. The result is that costs supposedly covered by insurance are pushed back onto the insured.

The term is found in the academic literature at least as early as Cutler and Zeckhauser's 1998 paper, "Adverse Selection in Health Insurance", which refers explicitly to an "adverse selection death spiral".

== Procedure ==
When one purchases an individual health insurance policy, one is assigned to a risk pool "group" specifically for subscribers to that policy. That group is not everyone who holds a similar policy issued by the company but only a very small portion of subscribers who hold similar policies. A group is typically open for only a set enrollment period, after which it is closed to any new subscribers. The group size never increases after it is closed, but decreases.

Over time, many policyholders in the group acquire health conditions. Hence, the claims costs for the entire group increase and so does the average health cost for the individuals in the group. The insurer then raises the rates to cover the higher costs. Subscribers with better health realize that they can reapply for and obtain other similar health insurance at low rates for new subscribers that are similar to the original rates of the current policy. Often, the insurer will promote the "new" similar health plans. When one applies for the "new" policy, one's health will be re-evaluated, and one will have to requalify and be re-underwritten. However, if one has acquired certain health conditions over the term of the current policy, one will most likely will be disqualified for the "new" policy, or offered the lower rate at the cost of excluding coverage for the recently acquired health condition that needs treatment.

The people who remain healthy are thus incentivized to flee the group. As the others cannot flee (because they cannot qualify for cheaper health insurance) and the group is closed to new, healthy subscribers, the average cost for the individual group member increases, and premiums are increased to reflect this cost. This incentivizes some of the remaining policyholders to change to more expensive policies which are still cheaper than the newly increased premiums, exacerbating the problem. The cycle continues until none of the remaining sick can justify or even afford paying the premiums. The individual health insurance policy group then goes out of existence. Since the original size of the group was small in relation to the total subscriber base, the event is inconsequential to the insurer.

== Regulation ==
In most US states, it is illegal for health insurers to individually re-underwrite a subscriber (re-evaluate their health risk and increase their premium) after the subscriber files a claim under the policy, unless the subscriber withheld information about a pre-existing medical condition. The process described so far can best be described as "group re-underwriting": evaluating the group's medical costs and adjusting the group's premium accordingly. It accomplishes the same effect: purging companies' risk pool of higher risk individuals or allowing the insurer to eliminate any high-risk pool altogether or excluding individuals' health conditions even though the health conditions were acquired during the terms of the policies with the company and while the premiums were faithfully paid. That has the advantage to insurers to decrease their liability without violating the terms of policy or being accused of individual re-underwriting. It also allows the insurer to claim that the policy offers protection against rises in premiums because of the policyholder acquiring health conditions even though that protection is limited.

== Consequences ==
Through the process of "group re-underwriting", as healthy people transfer to new pools, the insurer is able to keep down the premiums of their health plans at the cost of increasing premiums for those who later become sick. During the lifetime of a specific risk pool, the sick bear an increasing share of their medical costs, negating the benefits of signing up for health insurance in the first place.

== See also ==
- Cancellation (insurance)
- Insurance as regulation
