= Guaranteed issue =

Nondiscriminatory availability of health insurance

Guaranteed issue is a term used in health insurance to describe a situation where a policy is offered to any eligible applicant without regard to health status. Often this is the result of guaranteed issue statutes regarding how health insurance may be sold, or to provide a means for people with pre-existing conditions the ability to obtain health insurance of some kind.

== Description ==
Under the Patient Protection and Affordable Care Act (ACA), all health insurance policies must be sold on a guaranteed issue basis.

Prior to the ACA, a small number of states required insurers to sell all coverage on this basis in the individual health insurance market. In addition, the "creditable coverage" provisions of the Health Insurance Portability and Accountability Act of 1996 are often considered to be a federal guaranteed issue regulation which some states fulfilled using a high-risk pool program.

== See also ==
- Community rating
