= Prescription analytics =

Prescription analytics is the practice of analyzing consumers' prescription drug histories in order to provide useful information for health insurers.

In the United States, two-thirds of health insurers use prescription history reports to help identify consumers who may prove expensive to insure, and to set prices or deny coverage. The reports, created and sold by medical data brokers such as MedPoint and IntelliScript, cost about $15 each and include information going back five years covering drug names, dosage, fill dates, refills, pharmacy and physician information, and possible medical conditions. The reports also include a “risk score”, based on a health risk assessment, predicting what an individual might cost an insurer in the future, as well as listing medical conditions the person may be being treated for.
