= Publicly funded health care =

Form of health care financing

Health expenditure funding sources by country

Publicly funded healthcare is a system of health care financing in which the costs of all or most health care services are paid from publicly managed funds. These funds are usually raised through taxes or mandatory contributions and are overseen by public institutions. Access to healthcare and the services provided are set out in rules that apply to most of the residents who can receive care regardless of their individual income.

The fund may be a not-for-profit trust that pays out for healthcare according to common rules established by the members or by some other democratic form. In some countries, the fund is controlled directly by the government or by an agency of the government for the benefit of the entire population. That distinguishes it from other forms of private medical insurance, the rights of access to which are subject to contractual obligations between an insured person (or their sponsor) and an insurance company, which seeks to make a profit by managing the flow of funds between funders and providers of health care services.

When taxation is the primary means of financing health care and sometimes with compulsory insurance, all eligible people receive the same level of cover regardless of their financial circumstances or risk factors.

== Varieties of public systems ==
Most developed countries have partially or fully publicly funded health systems. Most western industrial countries have a system of social insurance based on the principle of social solidarity that covers eligible people from bearing the direct burden of most health care expenditure, funded by taxation during their working life.

Among countries with significant public funding of healthcare there are many different approaches to the funding and provision of medical services. Systems may be funded from general government revenues (as in Canada, United Kingdom, Brazil and India) or through a government social security system (as in Australia, France, Belgium, Japan and Germany) with a separate budget and hypothecated taxes or contributions. The proportion of the cost of care covered also differs: in Canada, all hospital care is paid for by the government, while in Japan, patients must pay 10 to 30% of the cost of a hospital stay. Services provided by public systems vary. For example, the Belgian government pays the bulk of the fees for dental and eye care, while the Australian government covers eye care but not dental care.

Publicly funded medicine may be administered and provided by the government, as in the Nordic countries, Portugal, Spain, United Kingdom, and Italy; in some systems, though, medicine is publicly funded but most hospital providers are private entities, as in Canada. The organization providing public health insurance is not necessarily a public administration, and its budget may be isolated from the main state budget. Some systems do not provide universal healthcare or restrict coverage to public health facilities. Some countries, such as Germany and France, have multiple public insurance organizations linked by a common legal framework. Some, such as the Netherlands and Switzerland, allow private for-profit insurers to participate.

=== Two-tier healthcare ===
Almost every major country that has a publicly funded healthcare system also has a parallel private system for patients who hold private medical insurance or themselves pay for treatment. In those states, those able to pay have access to treatment and comforts that may not be available to those dependent upon the state system.

From the inception of the NHS model (1948), public hospitals in the United Kingdom have included "amenity beds" which would typically be siderooms fitted more comfortably, and private wards in some hospitals where for a fee more amenities are provided. Patients using these beds are in an NHS hospital for surgical treatment, and operations are generally carried out in the same operating theatres as NHS work and by the same personnel but the hospital and the physician receive funding from an insurance company or the patient. These amenity beds do not exist in all publicly funded systems, such as in Spain. The NHS also pays for private hospitals to take on surgical cases under contract.

== Policy discussion ==
2006 international survey on how responsible people think the government is for healthcare funding

Many countries are seeking the right balance of public and private insurance, public subsidies, and out-of-pocket payments.

Many OECD countries have implemented reforms to achieve policy goals of ensuring access to health care, improving the quality of health care and health outcomes, allocating an appropriate level of public sector other resources to healthcare but at the same time ensuring that services are provided in a cost-efficient and cost-effective manner (microeconomic efficiency). A range of measures, such as better payment methods, have improved the microeconomic incentives facing providers. However, introducing improved incentives through a more competitive environment among providers and insurers has proved difficult.

A 2009 Harvard study published in the American Journal of Public Health found more than 44,800 excess deaths annually in the United States because of Americans' lacking health insurance, equivalent to one excess death every 12 min. More broadly, the total number of people in the United States, whether insured or uninsured, who die because of lack of medical care was estimated in a 1997 analysis to be nearly 100,000 per year.

== See also ==
- Global health
- Health policy
- Health system
- Health law
- Health care compared for varying degrees of public funding
- National health insurance
- Public opinion on health care reform in the United States
- Single-payer health care
- Socialized medicine
- Social insurance
- Universal health care
- National Health Service of the United Kingdom
