= National health insurance =

System of health insurance

National health insurance (NHI), sometimes called statutory health insurance (SHI), is a system of health insurance that insures a national population against the costs of health care. It may be administered by the public sector, the private sector, or a combination of both. Funding mechanisms vary with the particular program and country. National or statutory health insurance does not equate to government-run or government-financed health care, but is usually established by national legislation. In some countries, such as Australia's Medicare system, the UK's National Health Service and South Korea's National Health Insurance Service, contributions to the system are made via general taxation and therefore are not optional even though use of the health system it finances is. In practice, most people paying for NHI will join it. Where an NHI involves a choice of multiple insurance funds, the rates of contributions may vary and the person has to choose which insurance fund to belong to.

== History ==
Germany has the world's oldest national social health insurance system, with origins dating back to Otto von Bismarck's Sickness Insurance Law of 1883.

=== Great Britain ===
In Britain, the National Insurance Act 1911 included national social health insurance for primary care (not specialist or hospital care), initially for about one-third of the population—employed working class wage earners, but not their dependents. This system of health insurance continued in force until the creation of the National Health Service in 1948 which created a universal service, funded out of general taxation rather than on an insurance basis, and providing health services to all legal residents.

== Types of programs ==
National healthcare insurance programs differ both in how the contributions are collected, and in how the services are provided. In countries such as Canada, payment is made by the government directly from tax revenue and this is known as single-payer health care. The provision of services may be through either publicly or privately owned health care providers. In France, a similar system of compulsory contributions is made, but the collection is administered by non-profit organisations set up for the purpose.

An alternative funding approach is where countries implement national health insurance by legislation requiring compulsory contributions to competing insurance funds. These funds (which may be run by public bodies, private for-profit companies, or private non-profit companies), must provide a minimum standard of coverage and are not allowed to discriminate between patients by charging different rates according to age, occupation, or previous health status (pre-existing medical conditions). To protect the interest of both patients and insurance companies, the government establishes an equalization pool to spread risks between the various funds. The government may also contribute to the equalization pool as a form of health care subsidy. This is the model used in the Netherlands.

Other countries are largely funded by contributions by employers and employees to sickness funds. With these programs, funds come from neither the government nor direct private payments. This system operates in countries such as Germany and Belgium. These funds are usually non-profit institutions run solely for the benefit of their members. These systems are characterized by a mixture of three sources of funds in varying degrees: private, employer-employee contributions, and national/subnational taxes.

In addition to direct medical costs, some national insurance plans also provide compensation for loss of work due to ill-health, or may be part of wider social insurance plans covering things such as pensions, unemployment, occupational retraining, and financial support for students.

National schemes have the advantage that the pool or pools of contributors tend to be vast and reflective of the national population. Health care costs tend to be high at the extremes of age and other specific events in life, such as during pregnancy and childbirth. In a national healthcare scheme, these costs are covered by contributions made to the pool over an individual's lifetime (i.e., higher when earning capacity is greatest to meet costs incurred at times when earning capacity is low or non-existent). This differs from the private insurance schemes with contribution rates that vary year by year, according to health risks such as age, family history, previous illnesses, and height/weight ratios. Consequently, some people tend to have to pay more for their health insurance when they are sick or are least able to afford it. These problems do not exist in national health insurance schemes.

== Programs ==
- Aasandha – Maldives
- Health care in Argentina
- Health care in Australia – Medicare (Australia)
- Healthcare in Belgium – Sickness and Invalidity Insurance
- Healthcare in Brazil - SUS
- Health care in Canada
- Health care in Colombia – Law 100 – National Health Insurance Scheme: Contributory Vs. Subsidized coverage (NHIS)
- Health care in France
- Healthcare in Germany
- Health care in Ghana – National Health Insurance Scheme (NHIS)
- Health care in Israel
- Health care in Italy – National Health Service (SSN)
- Healthcare in India - Employees' State Insurance, Ayushman Bharat Yojana, others are provided insurance through their employer.
- Health care in Japan – People without insurance through employers can participate in a national health insurance program administered by local governments.
- Healthcare in Nigeria – National Health Insurance Scheme (NHIS)
- Health care in the Netherlands
- Healthcare in the Philippines – Social Health Insurance Program, a resource pooling, risk sharing health care program that provides quality health care financing not only to the employed but to the sick, elderly, and indigents, as well
- Health care in Poland
- Healthcare in Switzerland – A compulsory health insurance covers a range of treatments which are set out in detail in the Federal Act.
- Healthcare in Taiwan – National Health Insurance (NHI)
- Health care in the United Kingdom – National Insurance
- South Korea National Health Insurance Service

== See also ==
- Health care compared
- Health care politics
- Publicly funded health care
- Single-payer health care
- Universal health care
