= Adverse selection =

Selective trading based on possession of hidden information

In economics, insurance, and risk management, adverse selection is a market situation where asymmetric information results in a party taking advantage of undisclosed information to benefit more from a contract or trade.

In an ideal world, buyers should pay a price which reflects their willingness to pay and the value to them of the product or service, and sellers should sell at a price which reflects the quality of their goods and services. However, when one party holds information that the other party does not have, they have the opportunity to damage the other party by maximizing self-utility, concealing relevant information, and perhaps even lying. This opportunity has secondary effects: the party without the information may take steps to avoid entering into an unfair contract, perhaps by withdrawing from the interaction; a party may ask for higher or lower prices, diminishing the volume of trade in the market; or parties may be deterred from participating in the market, leading to less competition and higher profit margins for participants.

A standard example is the market for used cars with hidden flaws, also known as lemons. George Akerlof in his 1970 paper, "The Market for 'Lemons'", highlights the effect adverse selection has on the used car market, creating an imbalance between the sellers and the buyers that may lead to a market collapse. The paper further describes the effects of adverse selection in insurance as an example of the effect of information asymmetry on markets, a sort of "generalized Gresham's law".

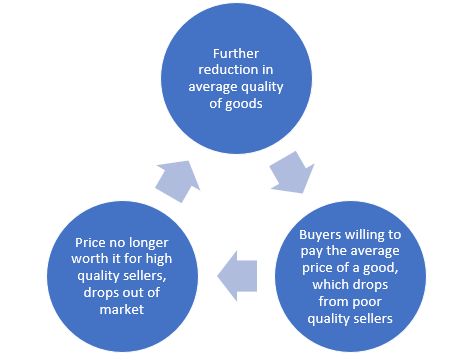
The spiralling effect of how adverse selection worsens the quality of goods in the market

The theory behind market collapse starts with consumers who want to buy goods from an unfamiliar market. Sellers, who have information about which good is high or poor quality, would aim to sell the poor quality goods at the same price as better goods, leading to a larger profit margin. The high quality sellers now no longer reap the full benefits of having superior goods, because poor quality goods pull the average price down to one which is no longer profitable for the sale of high quality goods. High quality sellers thus leave the market, thus reducing the quality and price of goods even further. This market collapse is then caused by demand not rising in response to a fall in price, and the lower overall quality of market provisions. Sometimes the seller is the uninformed party instead, when consumers with undisclosed attributes purchase goods or contracts that are priced for other demographics.

Adverse selection has been discussed for life insurance since the 1860s, and the phrase has been used since the 1870s.

== Examples ==
=== Insurance ===
Adverse selection was first described for life insurance. It creates a demand for insurance which is positively correlated with the insured's risk of loss.

For example, overall, non-smokers have a much lower risk of death than smokers of the same age and sex. If the price of insurance does not vary according to smoking status, then it will be more valuable for smokers than for non-smokers. Thus smokers will have a greater incentive to buy insurance and will purchase more insurance than non-smokers. This increases the average mortality rate of the insured pool, causing the insurer to pay more claims. The insurer relies on the premiums of the healthy non-smokers to cover the costs incurred by the smokers. As more smokers purchase insurance, costs to insure them increases.

In response, the company may increase premiums to correspond to the higher average risk. However, higher prices cause rational non-smokers to cancel their insurance as insurance becomes uneconomic for them, exacerbating the adverse selection problem. Eventually, higher prices will push out all non-smokers in search of better options, and the only people left who will be willing to purchase insurance are smokers. The same applies to health insurance.

To counter the effects of adverse selection, insurers may require premiums that reflect the customer's risk, distinguishing high-risk from low-risk individuals. For instance, medical insurance companies ask a range of questions and may request medical or other reports on individuals who apply to buy insurance. The premium can be varied accordingly, and any unacceptably high-risk individuals are rejected (cf. pre-existing condition). This risk selection process is part of underwriting. In many countries, insurance law incorporates an "utmost good faith" or uberrima fides doctrine, which requires potential customers to answer any questions asked by the insurer fully and honestly. Dishonesty may be met with refusals to pay claims.

Adverse selection can also result from government regulations prohibiting insurers from setting prices based on certain information. This is sometimes referred to as "regulatory adverse selection". For instance, the US government enacted the Affordable Care Act (ACA) which prohibits insurers from charging higher prices based on pre-existing conditions and gender. To help prevent adverse selection, the ACA was designed with a risk adjustment programme to compensate insurers with sicker enrollees. The ACA also required US residents to enroll in healthcare coverage or pay a tax penalty. This was in place to ensure enrollment by healthy individuals, even though they are less likely to claim and thus they may not otherwise have considered the coverage to be financially worthwhile.

Empirical evidence of adverse selection is mixed. Several studies investigating correlations between risk and insurance purchase have failed to show the predicted positive correlation for life insurance, auto insurance, and health insurance. On the other hand, "positive" test results for adverse selection have been reported in health insurance, long-term care insurance, and annuity markets.

Weak evidence of adverse selection in certain markets suggests that the underwriting process is effective at screening high-risk individuals. Another possible reason is the negative correlation between risk aversion (such as the willingness to purchase insurance) and risk level (estimated beforehand based on hindsight observation of the occurrence rate for other observed claims) in the population. If risk aversion is higher among lower-risk customers, adverse selection can be reduced or even reversed, leading to "advantageous" selection. This occurs when a person is both less likely to engage in risk-increasing behaviour are more likely to engage in risk-decreasing behaviour, such as taking affirmative steps to reduce risk.

For example, there is evidence that smokers are more willing to do risky jobs than non-smokers. This greater willingness to accept risk may reduce insurance policy purchases by smokers.

From a public policy viewpoint, some adverse selection can also be advantageous. Adverse selection may lead to a higher fraction of total losses for the whole population being covered by insurance than if there were no adverse selection.

=== Capital markets ===
When raising capital, some types of securities are more prone to adverse selection than others. An equity offering for a company that reliably generates earnings at a good price will be bought up before an unknown company's offering, leaving the market filled with less desirable offerings that were unwanted by other investors. Assuming that managers have inside information about the firm, outsiders are most prone to adverse selection in equity offers. This is because managers may offer stock when they know the offer price exceeds their private assessments of the company's value. Outside investors, therefore, require a high rate of return on equity to compensate them for the risk of buying a "lemon".

Adverse selection costs are lower for debt offerings. When debt is offered, this acts as a signal to outside investors that the firm's management believes the current stock price is undervalued, as the firm would otherwise be keen on offering equity.

Thus the required returns on debt and equity are related to perceived adverse selection costs, implying that debt should be cheaper than equity as a source of external capital, forming a "pecking order".

The example described assumes that the market does not know managers are selling stock. The market could gain access to this information, perhaps by finding it in company reports. In this case, the market will capitalize on the information found. If the market has access to the company's information, the presence of information asymmetry is removed, and as such there is no longer a state of adverse selection.

The presence of adverse selection in capital markets results in excessive private investment. Projects that otherwise would not have received investments due to having a lower expected return than the opportunity cost of capital, received funding as a result of information asymmetry in the market. As such, governments must account for the presence of adverse selection in the implementation of public policies.

=== Contract theory ===
In modern contract theory, "adverse selection" characterizes principal-agent models in which an agent has private information before a contract is written. For example, a worker may know his effort costs (or a buyer may know his willingness-to-pay) before an employer (or a seller) makes a contract offer. In contrast, "moral hazard" characterizes principal-agent models where there is symmetric information at the time of contracting. The agent may become privately informed after the contract is written. According to Hart and Holmström (1987), moral hazard models are further subdivided into hidden action and hidden information models, depending on whether the agent becomes privately informed due to an unobservable action that he himself chooses or due to a random move by nature. Hence, the difference between an adverse selection model and a hidden information (sometimes called hidden knowledge) model is simply the timing. In the former case, the agent is informed at the outset. In the latter case, he becomes privately informed after the contract has been signed.

In most adverse selection models, it is assumed that the agent's private information is "soft" (i.e., the information cannot be certified). Yet, there are also some adverse selection models with "hard" information (i.e., the agent may have evidence to prove that claims he makes about his type are true).

Adverse selection models can be further categorized into models with private values and models with interdependent or common values. In models with private values, the agent's type has a direct influence on his own preferences. For example, he has knowledge over his effort costs or his willingness-to-pay. Alternatively, models with interdependent or common values occur when the agent's type has a direct influence on the principal's preferences. For instance, the agent may be a seller who privately knows the quality of a car.

Seminal contributions to private value models have been made by Roger Myerson and Eric Maskin, while interdependent or common value models have first been studied by George Akerlof. Adverse selection models with private values can also be further categorized by distinguishing between models with one-sided private information and two-sided private information. The most prominent result in the latter case is the Myerson-Satterthwaite theorem. More recently, contract-theoretic adverse selection models have been tested both in laboratory experiments and in the field.

=== Banking ===
When banks and borrowers come together to determine the personal loans, mortgages or business loans, adverse selection is deeply rooted in the discussions.

For example, when a new customer approaches a bank seeking a personal loan, they will always know their spending, saving and potential income better than the bank would. This creates adverse selection as the customer possess information about their life which is unknown to the bank, and they can take an economic advantage due to this information.

Similarly, when a business requests a loan from a bank, this also creates adverse selection. The business possesses information about market trends, insider business knowledge, and other future happenings relevant to the business that a bank would not know when lending money to a company.

A further case where adverse selection is relevant is when banks trade loans. This process creates adverse selection, as when a bank transfers a loan to a new bank, they are unaware of how risky the borrower is and the other associated risks that go along with banks lending their money.

To counteract the effects of adverse selection, banks have moved towards building stronger relationships with their customers, to assist in further understanding some of the hidden information the consumers have when they are borrowing from banks. Furthermore, banks can adjust interest rates to help alleviate some of they unknown risks involved. Banks have also implemented heavier screening on loan applicants so that they are receiving the full picture when they lend their money to borrowers. They are investing significant amounts of resources to gather enough information on borrowers to help estimate the possibility of the loan being repaid by the borrower. Additionally, banks have implemented limits on lending for some borrowers to lower the risk of customers defaulting on their loan.

Banks have been trying to implement as many safeguards as possible on the borrowing process to try to limit the effects of adverse selection on their business.

== Reducing adverse selection ==
Accounting for the significant amount of credence goods in the market, the incentives for misbehaviour among both buyers and sellers serve as large threats to market efficiencies to society as a whole. Since adverse selection largely persists due to asymmetric information, the key steps to reducing its effects starts with eliminating said asymmetry by encouraging transparency between both sides of the market.

=== Signalling and screening ===
In markets where the seller has private information about the product they wish to sell, reputation mechanisms help to reduce adverse selection by acting as a signal of quality. An example would be the online marketplace, eBay. A seller known for selling high-quality goods can further enhance its reputation by utilizing eBay's reputation system. There is an incentive for the seller to do so, as buyers who derive utility from purchasing the product are naturally inclined to source their purchase from high-quality sellers. As such, buyers are able to rely on the reputation system as a signal to filter high-quality sellers from low-quality sellers.

Unlike quality signalling where the better informed party acts first, screening is better suited when the uninformed party needs to make the initial decision in participating in a contract. Recognizing that adverse selection stems from the lack of information, using screening games allows players to try and analyse if the risk of the contract's worst possible outcome makes participating worth it in the first place. Parties can always attempt to be better informed, but if achieving new information is too costly, and the threat of economic loss from the contract is too great, screening methodologies suggest not participating in the contract at all.

For better context using the example of how adverse selection occurs in financial markets, if investors believe the risk of poor returns is too high, and the cost of consulting a trading specialist is not worth it, they have screened the possible outcomes and realize it is not worth making that initial investment from the start.

In health insurance adverse selection can be reduced with premiums which penalize frequent coverage switching.

=== Lemon law ===
Lemon laws act as a form of consumer protection in the event the buyer purchases a defective product. While usually applied to automobiles, lemon laws are also used for most consumer goods. Such regulations were enacted to reduce cases where manufacturers knowingly sold defective products. Lemon laws vary by countries, but generally require the seller to repurchase the product or replace it. For example, the Texas Deceptive Trade Practices allows for consumers to sue for triple damages in the event of sustaining harm as a result of purchasing a defective product as a result of the seller withholding information at the time of the transaction. As such, government regulations act as a deterrent against sellers exploiting the asymmetric information between the parties involved. This, in turn, reduces the problem of adverse selection, as buyers who are knowingly protected by lemon laws are more inclined to engage in transactions they previously would not have done so due to the lack of viable information available to them.

=== Warranties ===
By offering a warranty for the product the seller intends to sell, they are able to indirectly communicate private information about the product to the buyer. Warranties assist in conveying information about the seller's confidence in the product for its quality, by acting as a guarantee on the product. A common example is in the used car market, where apart from warranties offered by the seller itself, the buyer may purchase additional warranties in the form of insurance from third-party companies.

== Moral hazard ==
A related form of market failure is moral hazard. With moral hazard, the asymmetric information between the parties causes one party to increase their risk exposure after the transaction is concluded, whereas adverse selection occurs before. Moral hazard suggests that customers who have insurance may be more likely to behave recklessly than those who do not. Adverse selection, on the other hand, suggests that customers will withhold information about existing health conditions from the health insurer when purchasing insurance.

Adverse selection vs moral hazard
Major differences	Adverse selection	Moral hazard
Asymmetric information regarding the	type of individual	behaviour of an individual
That causes a bias	before entering a contract	after entering a contract

Realistic scenarios that actively involve both economic phenomena would include the market for rental properties. Adverse selection occurs in the process of deciding before renting or buying a property (the contract). Those who are uncommitted to doing the regular upkeep of the house due to time constraints, are ill-prepared to compensate for damages, or just innately irresponsible, are more likely to rent. In contrast to a person who is interested in buying, they would be less willing to maintain a property in good condition for the long-term. These types of renters would then take advantage of the asymmetric information between the landlord, who would ideally want to lease the property to tenants without these characteristics. Moral hazards takes place after the contract. Tenants are more likely to change their behaviour after moving in, as there are less incentives to be good tenants since the property is not theirs and they can leave as soon as their lease ends. This would mean less inclination to maintain good upkeep, or being liable for anything the landlord should be responsible for. Both adverse selection and moral hazard is at play here, but occur at different points in time and are due to asymmetric information regarding different factors. In the latter case, however, it could be argued that there is no real issue of asymmetric information at play, given that the source of the behaviour change is a particular incentive structure which all parties are aware of.

=== Adverse selection in game theory ===
The crisis of various financial markets makes people pay more and more attention to the market analysis of markets with adverse selection, especially the credit market and insurance market. Most of the current market analysis on competitive equilibrium market with adverse selection is based on the research results of Rothschild and Stiglitz (1976). We can also add adverse selection to a broad form of competitive market games. It allows companies to offer any limited contract, as well as a price differential subsidy. At the same time, the company pulled out of the market after initial contract offers were observed. In such cases, Netzer, Nick and Florian (2014) proved that perfect equilibrium in subgames always exists. When the withdrawal is costless, the set of equilibrium outcomes may correspond to the entire set of feasible contracts. We then focus on robust equilibria that continue to exist for small withdrawal costs. Netzer, Nick and Florian (2014) suggested that the Miyazaki—Wilson contracts are the unique, robust equilibrium outcome in this case.

=== Adverse selection in business ===
In business dealings, buyers and sellers often encounter information asymmetry. For example, manufacturers may generally be more accurate than suppliers in predicting demand for their products. Another example is the acquisition of a company in which senior management of the target company has a deeper understanding of the information and value of the company's intangible assets than the acquirer. However, most of the theoretical research on the contract between buyer and seller assumes that private information is unverifiable. Therefore, informed buyers can make arbitrary claims about subjective information parameters. Patrick (2014) believes that private information is verifiable in practice.

=== Adverse selection and collateral in lending market ===
In accordance with the research from Loannidou, Pavanini & Peng in April 2022, the adverse selection theory also plays a significant role in determining the lending market performance based on the incremental costs of collateral and debt contracts.

While the recent research also pointed out that, in separation of ex ante and ex post channels of collateral, the increasing level of adverse selection moral problem is having significant effects on bond markets and lenders' spirit. While the empirical evidences and statistical model both suggested that, the utilization of collateral could reduce the negative effect of adverse selection. In practice, through the promotion of information sharing system and credit rating mechanism, it is expected that, within the lending market regulations on collateral contact, the relevant stakeholder could have better incentives and techniques to reduce the social welfare cost that is caused by adverse selection.

By including a separate borrower, there is sufficient evidence to conclude that, under the diversification lending strategy, the implementation of collateral could effectively mitigate the adverse selection issues, and adjust the borrower's financial behaviour into a positive direction.

=== Adverse selection with asymmetric information in the mortgage market ===
In the acquisition of commercial mortgages between the sellers and borrowers, the adverse selection problem will appear corresponding with the phenomenon of asymmetric information. In case of CMBS, An, Deng & Gabriel (2010) pointed out that, due to the unequal information on the secondary market loans, it reinforce the conduit on lenders about the mortgage quality and information. The investors on mortgage market will effectively consider the effect of adverse selection, which correspondingly lead to a lower price margin on loans and portfolios in the market. To sum up, although the agency problem does not appears in junk loans and bonds, it still add the dissatisfied opinion on investor's behaviours.

== See also ==
- Agency cost
- Community rating
- Death spiral (insurance)
- Unintended consequences
