= Pat Tiberi =

American politician

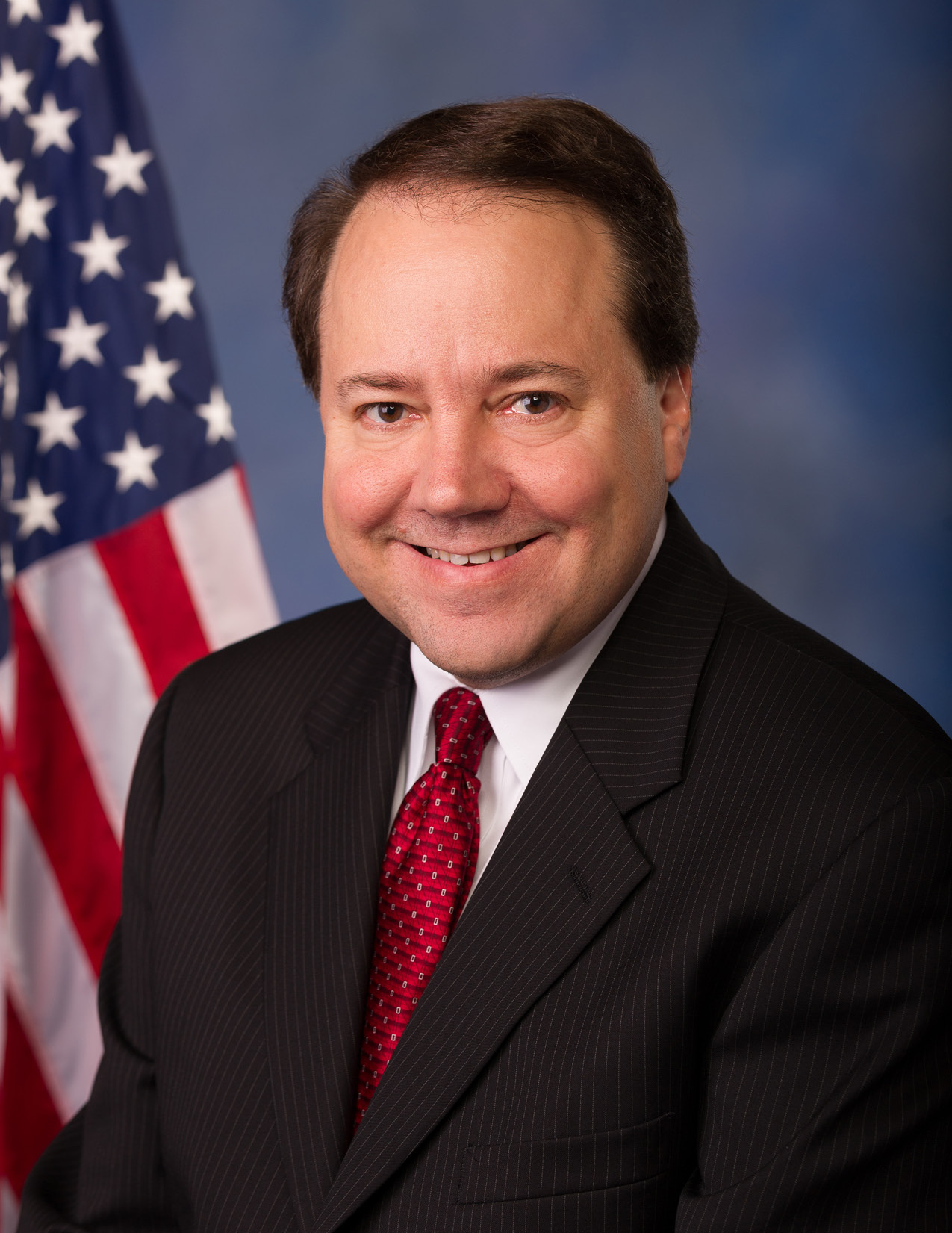
- Official portrait, 2015

Chair of the Joint Economic Committee
- In office January 3, 2017 – January 11, 2018
- Preceded by: Dan Coats
- Succeeded by: Erik Paulsen

Member of the U.S. House of Representatives from Ohio's 12th district
- In office January 3, 2001 – January 15, 2018
- Preceded by: John Kasich
- Succeeded by: Troy Balderson

Member of the Ohio House of Representatives from the 26th district
- In office January 3, 1993 – December 31, 2000
- Preceded by: Constituency established
- Succeeded by: Linda Reidelbach

Personal details
- Born: Patrick Joseph Tiberi; October 21, 1962 (age 63) Columbus, Ohio, U.S.
- Party: Republican
- Spouse: Denice Tiberi
- Education: Ohio State University (BA)

Patrick Joseph Tiberi (/ˈtiːbɛri/; born October 21, 1962) is an American lobbyist and politician who served as the U.S. representative for Ohio's 12th congressional district from 2001 to 2018. His district included communities north and east of Columbus. He is a member of the Republican Party, and previously served in the Ohio House of Representatives from 1993 to 2000. He briefly served as Chair of the new Republican Main Street Congressional Caucus from September 7, 2017.

In October 2017, Tiberi announced his plan to resign from Congress in January 2018 to lead the Ohio Business Roundtable. His last day in office was January 15.

== Early life, education and career ==
Tiberi was born in Columbus, Ohio, the son of Italian immigrants, Rina (Silvestri) and Joe Tiberi. He attended the city's Woodward Park Middle school and Northland High School. Tiberi attended the Ohio State University, where he was a member of The Ohio State University Marching Band. He graduated from Ohio State in 1985 with a degree in journalism. Tiberi was the first person in his family to graduate from college. He was later awarded an honorary doctorate in the Humanities by Capital University in May 2005.

Upon graduation from college, Tiberi worked as a realtor for RE/MAX Achievers, a franchise of RE/MAX, located in Lewis Center, Ohio. He was elected to the Ohio House of Representatives in 1993, and he soon rose to the position of House Majority Leader.

Tiberi is Catholic.

== U.S. House of Representatives ==
Tiberi authored legislation that made it easier for returning military veterans to receive federal jobs and provided for more federal assistance to caregivers of incapacitated adults. Both of the bills were passed in 2006.

Tiberi voted against the American Recovery and Reinvestment Act of 2009, saying the bill was "loaded with Nancy Pelosi's grab bag of big spending wishes." Following passage of the bill, Tiberi wrote a letter to United States Secretary of Agriculture Tom Vilsack in an effort to bring stimulus money to his district.

Tiberi was described as loyal to former House Speaker John Boehner. When Boehner resigned his speakership and was replaced by Paul Ryan, Tiberi sought to replace Ryan as the chairperson of the United States House Committee on Ways and Means. The steering committee selected representative Kevin Brady over Tiberi to chair the committee. Ryan controlled five of the votes and reportedly supported Brady's bid.

Tiberi was considered a potential candidate for the Republican Party's nomination for the Senate in the 2018 election, but he declined to run. His large fundraising haul had fueled speculation of his possible entrance into the race.

=== Oversight of the executive branch ===
==== IRS ====
===== Targeting controversy =====
Tiberi spoke at a Ripon Society forum and addressed the IRS targeting controversy and tax reform. Tiberi said the IRS is one of the worst scandals he has seen in American history, stating that "...it's not like any other. It has Democrats, non-political independents, business owners, other individuals and people who don’t pay attention to government, kind of on their toes, because they know it can happen to them." Tiberi went on to say that the only way out was to show bipartisan partnership among the Administration in order to "...get this scandal off the front page [and] working with Republicans to get comprehensive tax reform done in a way that simplifies our code."

===== Tax returns =====
Tiberi voted against an amendment by Bill Pascrell before the Ways and Means Committee to request President Trump's federal income tax returns. He opposed the amendment as politically motivated and inviting a slippery slope. He said that Trump said "he will release them, and I encourage him to do so."

==== Department of Justice ====
Tiberi said that President Trump's firing of James Comey as the director of the FBI raised "many questions" amidst the FBI's investigation over Russia's involvement in the 2016 presidential election. Tiberi did not support the appointment of a special prosecutor to oversee the investigation. He said that he would support the appointment of a special prosecutor if the relevant congressional subcommittees recommended it.

=== Constituent engagement ===
Tiberi called town hall meetings "not productive" and "shouting matches". He held town hall meetings, including one for Tea Party members of Newark in August 2011 and one on Iran in September 2015.

He cosponsored legislation that would require a commission to host town halls regarding reforms to Medicare and Social Security.

When asked by the Dispatch editorial board if he would hold "a public, in-person town-hall meeting to answer questions from your constituents", Tiberi reiterated his opposition to town halls.

During the congressional recess of February 2017, Tiberi did not hold a town hall meeting to discuss healthcare reform with his constituents, but met in private with small groups. Prior to the recess, a constituent petition for a town hall with Tiberi surpassed 1,500 signatures. Over 200 small group meetings would be necessary to meet the demand of signatories alone. Constituents organized their own for February 22, 2017, and invited the congressman. Instead of attending the town hall, Tiberi delivered the keynote speech for a Knox County Republican Party fundraiser.

Tiberi does not represent Knox County as it is in Ohio's 7th congressional district. He joined many of his Republican congressmen in refusing to schedule town halls over the February 2017 recess. Tiberi maintained that he was both "the most accessible Congressman [his constituents have] ever had" and "one of the most accessible members of Congress." Tiberi's claim was questioned when his colleague Representative Joyce Beatty appeared at a town hall the previous night whereas he failed to appear at a citizen-led event. Tiberi, following a majority of his Republican colleagues in the House, did not hold a public meeting with constituents during the May 2017 recess, instead he joined Speaker Paul Ryan at a roundtable with businessmen and a Republican fundraiser at the home of Les Wexner.

One of Tiberi's claims in communications to his constituents about the Affordable Care Act was cited as an example of false claims lawmakers made about the healthcare law. The analysis was conducted by the publications Vox.com, ProPublica, Kaiser Health News, and Stat. Tiberi claimed that "in Ohio, almost one third of counties will have only one insurer participating in the exchange." The analysis concluded that this was true of 23% of counties in Ohio.

=== Committee assignments ===
- Committee on Ways and Means
  - Subcommittee on Health (Chair)
  - Subcommittee on Tax Policy
- Joint Economic Committee (Chair)

=== Congressional caucus memberships ===
- Republican Main Street Partnership
- Tuesday Group
- Congressional NextGen 9-1-1 Caucus
- U.S.-Japan Caucus

== Political positions ==
=== Health care ===
Tiberi was critical of the Affordable Care Act (ACA) and expressed agreement with House Speaker Paul Ryan's framework to replace it. On February 17, 2017, Tiberi told the Ripon Society that his plan to change the ACA was more complex than a single piece of legislation. It involved relying on the regulatory power of Tom Price as HHS Secretary, the budget reconciliation process, and bipartisan legislation. His comments also suggested that he no longer thought a full repeal of the ACA was necessary. He said "it's not just about repealing. Maybe it's about modifying some provisions of the Affordable Care Act." The conservative Club for Growth ran a television ad criticizing Tiberi for his positions on healthcare. The ad accused Tiberi of blocking President Trump's efforts to repeal the ACA. Tiberi refused to hold town hall meetings to discuss healthcare policy during the February and Easter 2017 congressional recesses.

==== Medicaid expansion ====
Tiberi's proposed replacement of the ACA would have defunded the Medicaid expansion. This position was opposed by his seat's predecessor and Ohio Governor, John Kasich, who called eliminating Medicaid coverage for 700,000 Ohioans "a very, very bad idea, because we cannot turn our back on the most vulnerable." The cuts to Medicaid were estimated to cost Ohio between $16–18 billion and would cut services to children in special education.

==== Pre-existing conditions ====
The ACA prevents health insurance companies from both denying coverage and increasing premiums for individuals on the basis of pre-existing medical conditions. Tiberi co-sponsored legislation with Greg Walden to prevent this practice in the event that the ACA is repealed. According to Joseph Antos of the American Enterprise Institute, this policy would be difficult to pair with a repeal of the ACA. This is because without the individual mandate of the ACA, persons with pre-existing conditions would make up a disproportionate amount of the insured pool and drive up insurance premiums. Additionally, an amendment to the AHCA would allow states to waive the requirement that insurers not charge those with pre-existing conditions higher premiums.

==== Employer-sponsored insurance ====
As part of the repeal, Tiberi considered taxing some health benefits provided by employers.

The AHCA bill allows states to eliminate essential health benefits. This removes the protections for employer-provided insurance that limited copayment amounts and lifetime limits.

==== American Health Care Act ====
Tiberi supported the AHCA bill that would partially repeal and replace the ACA through the budget reconciliation process. Among other things, it replaces the individual mandate with a surcharge for those who have a lapse in insurance coverage, substitutes means-tested subsidies for insurance premiums with fixed refundable tax credits tied to age, and repeals taxes on those making over $250,000. For an earlier version of the bill, the Congressional Budget Office has estimated that these provisions, together with the cuts to Medicaid and the elimination of its expansion, would have led to a loss of insurance for 24 million. An analysis of the CBO report by the progressive advocacy group Center for American Progress estimated that 39,500 of those who will lose insurance would come from the congressman's own district. Tiberi praised the CBO report.

The legislation was privately constructed before it was debated by Ways and Means and the Energy and Commerce committees. After 18 hours of debate, Tiberi voted the legislation out of the Ways and Means Committee at 4:30 am on March 9, 2017. The initial version of the bill was not brought to the House floor for a vote.

Tiberi voted for an amended version of the bill that passed the House on May 4, 2017. The amended version exempts Congress from the elimination of essential health benefit protections for the general public. The vote occurred less than 24 hours after the final version was publicly available and before the CBO was able to analyze its cost and consequences. Following the vote, congressional Republicans celebrated the vote with President Trump in the Rose Garden, but Tiberi was not in attendance. The CBO analysis of the final version Tiberi voted for concluded that the legislation would cause 23 million to be left without health insurance, including one million Ohioans.

=== Privacy ===
Tiberi voted to repeal Internet privacy rules established by the FCC. The repeal of the rule was done using the Congressional Review Act. The rule would have allowed ISPs to sell customers' private browsing information only if they consented to such use. Tiberi's only public statement on the issue was a tweet to an opinion article on Forbes' website. A YouGov poll showed that 71% of Americans disapproved of the repeal, while 12% supported it.

=== Labor ===
Tiberi voted to eliminate rules in the Fair Labor Standards Act that required time-and-a-half compensation for working overtime. The legislation allows employers to instead compensate overtime work with time off.

=== Older Americans Act ===
Then-chairman of the Select Education Subcommittee, Tiberi wrote the bill that reauthorized the Older Americans Act through fiscal year 2011. This bill provides most of the funding for social services and nutritional programs for the nation's seniors. Tiberi received an 86 from the Retire Safe-Positions and a 10 from Alliance for Retired Americans-Lifetime Score. Tiberi wrote and sponsored the Older Americans Act Amendments of 2006. Tiberi supported a full repeal of Obamacare, saying "government has no place in getting between a patient's relationship with their doctor."

=== Education reform ===
Tiberi supported reform to the No Child Left Behind bill. He introduced legislation to improve local flexibility by allowing some school districts to go to the Secretary of Education and present their own plan for the allocation of Title 1 federal funding for approval. This amendment was signed into law in 2002. During the 109th Congress, Tiberi served as the Chair the Education and Workforce Subcommittee on Select Education—a subcommittee with jurisdiction over issues related to international and graduate education programs. The Teachers of English to Speakers of Other Languages (TESOL)-Positions rated Tiberi at 50%.

=== Government reform ===
During his first congressional campaign, Tiberi made the campaign promise to make government more accountable to citizens. During the 110th Congress he supported proposed reforms to make earmarks, lines inserted into a bill that direct money to a member of Congress, more transparent. Tiberi's goal was to introduce reform to give the president the authority to rid congressional bill of unrelated spending in bills. Tiberi also wanted to bring reform through a searchable database that would include an assessment of every piece of federal funding and the Education Oversight Subcommittee that he was appointed Vice-Chairman to in his first year in Congress. Citizens Against Government Waste-Positions gave Tiberi a 78% rating.

== Legislation ==
=== School safety ===
Tiberi introduced a bill with Rep. Ron Kind (D-WI) that gives a tax credit to law enforcement officers for any income they earn doing substitute teaching. Tiberi and Kind introduced the bill as one way to add security to schools. The bill was introduced in Washington, D.C., on April 12.

=== Workforce ===
In 2014, Tiberi cosponsored legislation called the Save American Workers Act of 2013 that would make a 40 hours, instead of 30, the standard definition of full-time work.

=== Tax policy ===
On April 10, 2014, Tiberi introduced the America's Small Business Tax Relief Act of 2014 (H.R. 4457; 113th Congress), a bill that would amend section 179 of the Internal Revenue Code, which mostly affects small- to medium-sized businesses, to retroactively and permanently extend from January 1, 2014, increased the cap on the amount of investment that can be immediately deducted from taxable income. The bill would return the tax code to its 2013 status and make the change permanent.

== Political campaigns ==
=== 2000 ===
Tiberi ran for and won the House seat that was vacated by nine-term incumbent and House Budget Committee chairman John Kasich, who retired to work as a consultant for Lehman Brothers. He won by nine points in a district that had long been considered to be far friendlier to the Democrats than the neighboring 15th, despite Kasich's long tenure. However, Tiberi never faced another contest nearly that close, in part because his district was redrawn after the 2000 census.

=== 2006 ===
Tiberi won reelection after defeating former Democratic Congressman Bob Shamansky.

=== 2008 ===
Tiberi defeated Democrat David Robinson.

=== 2010 ===
Tiberi defeated Democratic nominee Franklin County Commissioner Paula Brooks in the general election.

=== 2012 ===
Redistricting made the 12th much more secure for Tiberi. For his first six terms, Tiberi represented a fairly compact district centered around eastern Columbus, as well as most of the northern suburbs. However, the new map pushed the district into more Republican areas north and east of the Columbus area. Tiberi defeated Democratic nominee James Reese and Green party nominee Robert Fitrakis in the general election.

=== 2016 ===
Tiberi defeated Democratic nominee Ed Albertson and Green party nominee Joe Manchik in the general election.

== Electoral history ==
Election results
| Year | Office | Election | Name | Party | Votes | % | Opponent | Party | Votes | % | | Opponent | Party | Votes | % | | Opponent | Party | Votes | % | |
|---|---|---|---|---|---|---|---|---|---|---|---|---|---|---|---|---|---|---|---|---|---|
| 2000 | U.S. House of Representatives | General | Pat Tiberi | Republican | 139,242 | 52.87% | Maryellen O'Shaughnessy | Democratic | 115,432 | 43.83% | | Nick Hogan | Libertarian | 4,546 | 1.73% | | Gregory B. Richey | Natural Law | 2,600 | 0.99% | * |
| 2002 | U.S. House of Representatives | General | Pat Tiberi | Republican | 116,982 | 64.39% | Edward S. Brown | Democratic | 64,707 | 35.61% | | | | | | | | | | | |
| 2004 | U.S. House of Representatives | General | Pat Tiberi | Republican | 198,912 | 61.96% | Edward S. Brown | Democratic | 122,109 | 38.04% | * | | | | | | | | | | |
| 2006 | U.S. House of Representatives | General | Pat Tiberi | Republican | 145,943 | 57.30% | Bob Shamansky | Democratic | 108,746 | 42.70% | | | | | | | | | | | |
| 2008 | U.S. House of Representatives | General | Pat Tiberi | Republican | 197,408 | 54.79% | David Robinson | Democratic | 152,211 | 42.24% | | Steve Linnabary | Libertarian | 10,705 | 2.97% | | | | | | |
| 2010 | U.S. House of Representatives | General | Pat Tiberi | Republican | 150,163 | 55.79% | Paula Brooks | Democratic | 110,307 | 40.98% | | Travis Irvine | Libertarian | 8,710 | 3.24% | | | | | | |
| 2012 | U.S. House of Representatives | General | Pat Tiberi | Republican | 233,869 | 63.47% | Jim Reese | Democratic | 134,605 | 36.53% | | | | | | | | | | | |
| 2014 | U.S. House of Representatives | General | Pat Tiberi | Republican | 150,573 | 68.11% | David Tibbs | Democratic | 61,360 | 27.76% | | Bob Hart | Green | 9,148 | 4.14% | | | | | | |
| 2016 | U.S. House of Representatives | General | Pat Tiberi | Republican | 251,266 | 66.56% | Ed Albertson | Democratic | 112,638 | 29.84% | | Joe Manchik | Green | 13,474 | 3.57% | * | | | | | |

*Write-in and minor candidate notes: In 2000, Charles Ed Jordan received 1,556 votes (0.60%). In 2004, Chuck Spingola received 25 votes. In 2016, John J. Baumeister received 156 votes.

== Italian knighthood ==
Tiberi received the title of Knight, which was conferred by the Italian ambassador to the United States Claudio Bisogniero, in the Order of Merit of the Italian Republic, in May 2013. The Order of Merit of the Italian Republic (Italian: Ordine al merito della Repubblica Italiana) was founded as the senior order of knighthood by the second President of the Italian Republic, Luigi Einaudi, in 1951.

U.S. House of Representatives
| Preceded by John Kasich | Member of the U.S. House of Representatives from Ohio's 12th congressional district 2001–2018 | Succeeded by Troy Balderson |
| Preceded by Dan Coats | Chair of the Joint Economic Committee; 2017–2018 | Succeeded by Erik Paulsen |
Party political offices
| New office | Chair of the Republican Main Street Caucus; 2017 | Succeeded by Rodney Davis |
U.S. order of precedence (ceremonial)
| Preceded by Dennis Kucinich as Former U.S. Representative | Order of precedence of the United States as Former U.S. Representative | Succeeded by Jerry Huckaby as Former U.S. Representative |
