= HCFA =

HCFA may refer to:

- American Health Care Act of 2017, also known as the Health Care Freedom Act
- Centers for Medicare and Medicaid Services, formerly known as the Health Care Financing Administration
