= 2017 Affordable Care Act replacement proposals =

2017 plans considered to replace a U.S. federal statute

Several plans were considered to replace the Affordable Care Act (commonly referred to as the ACA or Obamacare) during the first presidency of Donald Trump, after the Republican Party gained a federal government trifecta in 2016. "Repeal and replace" has been a Republican slogan since March 2010 when the ACA was signed into law. The slogan was adopted by President Donald Trump.

Notecard from the Republican brainstorming session from which the "Repeal and replace" slogan originated, March 2010

== Background ==
Many Republicans including President Donald Trump have vowed to repeal and replace the ACA; President Trump signed an executive order on January 20, 2017, his first day in office, that according to White House Press Secretary Sean Spicer would "ease the burden of Obamacare as we transition from repeal and replace". Spicer would not elaborate further when asked for more details.

On January 12, 2017, the Senate voted 51 to 48 to pass an FY2017 budget resolution, S.Con.Res. 3, that contained language allowing the repeal of the ACA through the budget reconciliation process, which disallows a filibuster in the Senate. In spite of efforts during the vote-a-rama (a proceeding in which each amendment was considered and voted upon for about 10 minutes each until all 160 were completed) that continued into the early hours of the morning, Democrats could not prevent "the GOP from following through on its repeal plans."

== Plans ==
Several media outlets have reported widespread opposition in Congress and the American public against repealing the Affordable Care Act without replacing it. Barack Obama has stated that "The Republicans will own the problems with the health care system if they choose to repeal something that is providing health insurance to a lot of people".

=== Early proposals ===
The proposed CARE Act reverts many of the benefits of the Affordable Care Act.

Senator Rand Paul had said he planned to introduce a replacement plan during the week of January 9, 2017. One key provision in his plan was to offer cheaper, less robust insurance plans for people.

Senators Susan Collins (Maine) and Bill Cassidy (La.) introduced their plan, the Patient Freedom Act of 2017, on January 23, 2017, which would offer states the option to retain the Affordable Care Act, if they chose, or receive a block grant to be used on an alternative plan they prefer.

=== House legislation ===
==== American Health Care Act ====
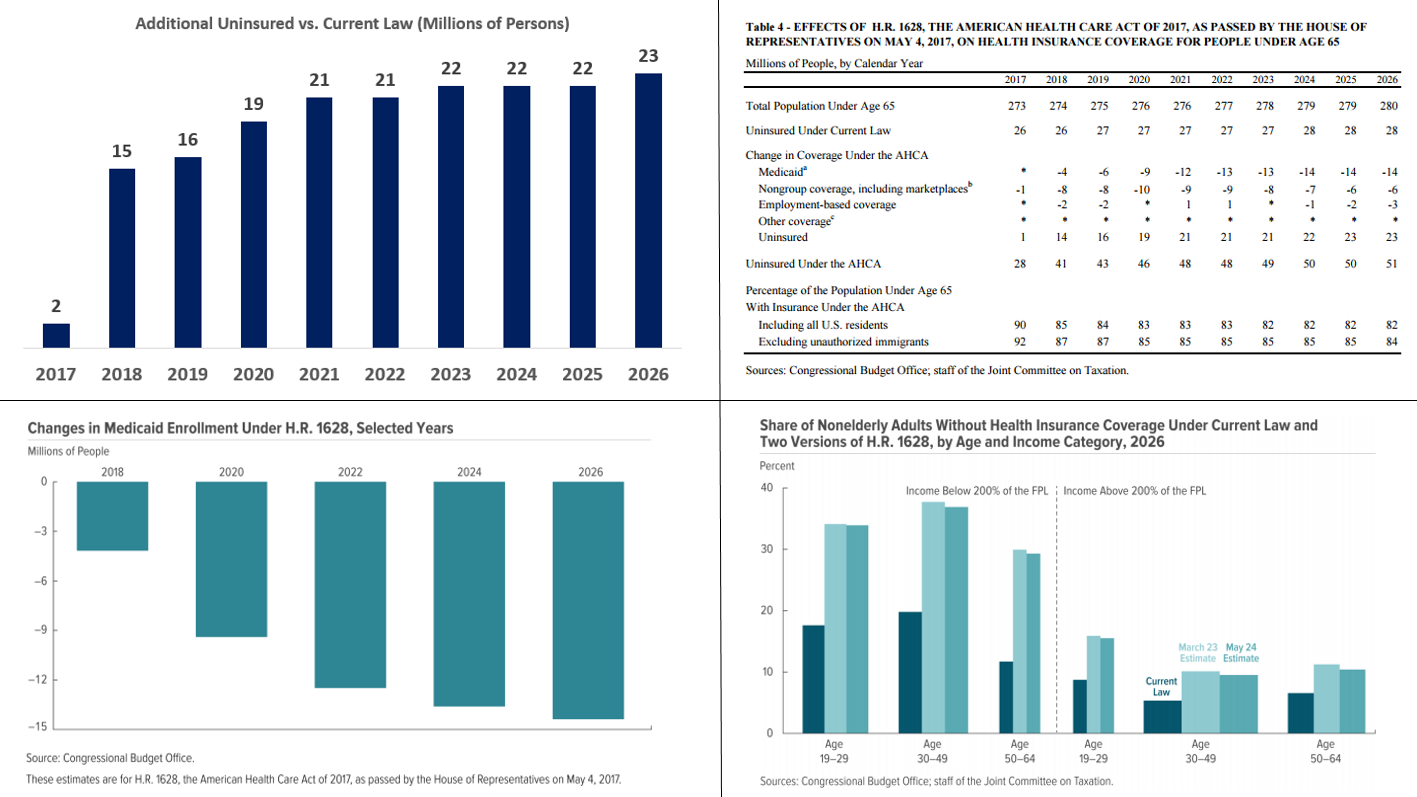
CBO estimated in May 2017 that the Republican AHCA would reduce the number of persons with health insurance by 23 million during 2026, relative to current law.

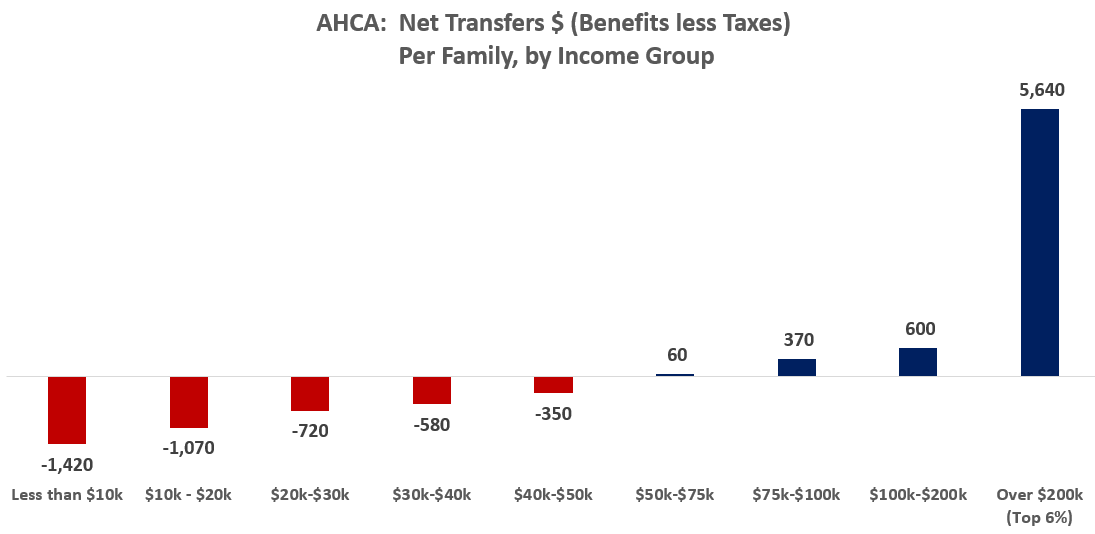
AHCA (Republican healthcare bill) impact on income distribution, as of the year 2022. Net benefits would go to families with over $50,000 income on average, with net costs to those below $50,000. Those earning over $200,000, the top 6%, would get about 70% of the benefits.

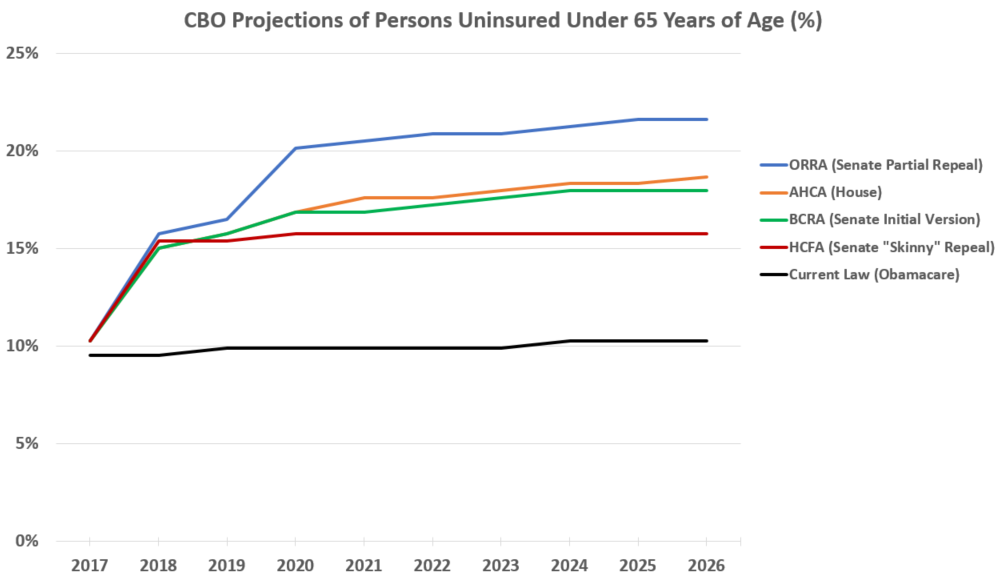
CBO projections of persons without health insurance under 65 years of age (%) under various legislative proposals and current law

A comprehensive plan to replace the Affordable Care Act was announced by the House Republican leadership on March 6, 2017. It retains many features of the Affordable Care Act, but replaces ACT's system of subsidies with tax credits and federally-funded Medicaid coverage with a system of block grants to states based on the nature and number of recipients served. Conservative critics such as Rand Paul characterized the plan as "Obamacare Light" and continued to advocate total repeal, while other Republicans such as Cory Gardner from states which had accepted Medicaid expansion expressed worry about whether the new plan would adequately fund services for Medicaid patients.

The United States House Committee on Ways and Means approved one portion of the bill on March 9, 2017, after an all-night session. The second portion of the bill was also approved March 9 by the United States House Committee on Energy and Commerce on a party-line vote. On March 13 the Congressional Budget Office released its evaluation of the proposal. It projected a rise in uninsured by 24 million by 2028, but savings of $337 billion over ten years. In 2018, most of the reduction would be caused by the elimination of the penalties for the individual mandate, both directly and indirectly. Later reductions would be due to reductions in Medicaid enrollment, elimination of the individual mandate penalty, subsidy reduction, and higher costs for some persons. By 2016 the CBO estimates that the average amount paid for medical insurance would decrease by about 10%. That results from increased prices for older patients and reduced credits which is predicted to increase the proportion of younger people in the pool and reduce the proportion of older people. The bill was approved by the House Budget Committee 19 to 17 on March 16, 2017. Three members of the Freedom Caucus, Dave Brat (Va.), Mark Sanford (S.C.) and Gary Palmer (Ala.) voted against it. It went next to the House Rules Committee, then to the full House. The bill, once it passed the House, would go to the Senate under budget reconciliation rules. Thus, only material which affects the budget can be included and only a simple majority vote will be required in the Senate. Despite his vow not to get involved into day-to-day politics former President Obama became a part of the discussion on March 23, 2017 (the seventh anniversary of ACA and one day prior to the vote on the American Health Care Act) by hailing among other things 20 million more people insured, preexisting conditions covered, young people staying on their parents' plans until 26, lowered costs for women's health care and free preventive care as progress due to the Affordable Care Act. On March 24, 2017, the bill was withdrawn by Speaker Paul Ryan (with the endorsement of President Donald Trump) after failing to gain enough support in the House of Representatives.

On May 4, 2017, the United States House of Representatives narrowly voted to repeal the Patient Protection and Affordable Care Act and passing the American Health Care Act with a narrow vote of 217 to 213, sending the bill to the Senate for deliberation. The Senate indicated they would write their own version of the bill, instead of voting on the House version.

==== Other legislation ====
On March 7, 2017 Pete Sessions sponsored an alternate proposal to repeal and replace the Patient Protection and Affordable Care Act entitled the "World's Greatest Healthcare Plan of 2017". The bill's current format removes the ACA's individual mandate, which taxed individuals without health insurance. Moreover, it maintains some aspects of the ACA including ensuring insurance coverage for pre-existing conditions, allowing children to stay on their parents' health care until they are 26 years old, and banning the use of lifetime spending limits by insurance companies.

=== Senate legislation ===
In response to the passage of the AHCA in the House, Republican leadership in the Senate stated that they would draft their own version of the legislation instead of bringing the House's version to a vote. Thirteen senators began meeting behind closed doors to draft the legislation. The group was criticized for not including women senators. In a meeting of the Senate Finance committee, Senator Claire McCaskill asked chairman Senator Orrin Hatch why no congressional hearings had been held on the proposed legislation. Video of the exchange went viral. In addition to forgoing normal hearings and legislative markup, Senate Republicans instituted new rules to limit the ability of reporters to ask senators about the legislation. When asked if Senate Republicans planned to release the text of the bill to the public, a Senate aide told Axios, "We aren't stupid." According to Don Ritchie, Historian Emeritus of the Senate, such a secretive process has not been seen in the Senate in over a hundred years.

On June 16, 2017, a bipartisan group of seven current governors sent a letter to Senate Majority and Minority Leaders Mitch McConnell and Chuck Schumer criticizing the House's legislation and requesting a bi-partisan effort in the Senate to reform healthcare. The signatories include Governors John Kasich (Ohio), Steve Bullock (Montana), Brian Sandoval (Nevada), John Bel Edwards (Louisiana), John Hickenlooper (Colorado), Charlie Baker (Massachusetts), and Tom Wolf (Pennsylvania).

On July 18, 2017, the healthcare bill in the Senate collapsed following the defections of Senators Mike Lee of Utah and Jerry Moran of Kansas, making them the third and fourth Republicans to defect. President Donald Trump expressed his disappointment and indicated he would "let Obamacare fail".

On July 25, a procedural vote was passed by the Senate to begin debate on the healthcare bill, 51–50 with Vice President Mike Pence breaking the tie. The same day, the bill was soundly defeated 43–57, with nine Republicans defecting and no Democrats or Independents voting for the bill. As the effort to repeal and replace the Affordable Care Act was stalled, Senate Majority Leader Mitch McConnell scheduled a vote on a partial-repeal amendment. This too was defeated, 45–55, with 7 Republicans defecting. Subsequently, a "skinny repeal" of the healthcare bill was voted on in the early hours of July 28. The decisive vote against their own party's bill was cast by Senators John McCain, Susan Collins and Lisa Murkowski; their vote along with the Democrats defeated the bill 49–51.

On September 13, 2017, an amendment to the American Health Care Act, commonly known as Graham-Cassidy, was submitted. The bill is sponsored by Lindsey Graham of South Carolina, with Bill Cassidy of Louisiana as a co-sponsor. A spokesman for the Senate Majority Leader Mitch McConnell said that a vote is planned for, before September 30 which is the deadline to pass bills under budget reconciliation. Rand Paul and John McCain indicated that they would vote against the bill.

On September 26, 2017, Senate Majority Leader Mitch McConnell announced that the Senate would not vote on the Graham-Cassidy bill.

=== Administration ===
The Trump administration ended subsidy payments to health insurance companies, in a move expected to raise premiums in 2018 for middle-class families by an average of about twenty percent nationwide and cost the federal government nearly $200 billion more than it saved over a ten-year period. The administration made it easier for businesses to use health insurance plans not covered by several of the ACA's protections, including for preexisting conditions, and allowed organizations not to cover birth control. In justifying the action, the administration made false claims about the health harms of contraceptives.

The administration proposed substantial spending cuts to Medicare, Medicaid and Social Security Disability Insurance. Trump had previously vowed to protect Medicare and Medicaid. The administration reduced enforcement of penalties against nursing homes that harm residents. As a candidate and throughout his presidency, Trump said he would cut the costs of pharmaceuticals. During his first seven months in office, there were 96 price hikes for every drug price cut. Abandoning a promise he made as candidate, Trump announced he would not allow Medicare to use its bargaining power to negotiate lower drug prices.
