= World's Greatest Healthcare Plan of 2017 =

- Long title: World's Greatest Healthcare Plan of 2017

The "World's Greatest Healthcare Plan of 2017", is the title for a United States of America legislative bill proposed on March 7, 2017, by Republican Party legislator Pete Sessions to repeal and replace the Patient Protection and Affordable Care Act ("ACA" or "Obamacare"). The bill's current format removes the ACA's individual mandate, which taxed individuals without health insurance. Moreover, it maintains some aspects of the ACA including ensuring insurance coverage for pre-existing conditions, allowing children to stay on their parents' health care until they are 26 years old, and banning the use of lifetime spending limits by insurance companies. This is not to be confused with the American Health Care Act, which was the bill backed by President Trump and most Republicans.
