= America's Small Business Tax Relief Act of 2014 =

Proposed United States law

- Long title: To amend the Internal Revenue Code of 1986 to permanently extend increased expensing limitations, and for other purposes.
- Announced in: the 113th United States Congress
- Sponsored by: Rep. Patrick J. Tiberi (R, OH-12)
- Number of co-sponsors: 6

Legislative history
- Introduced in the House as H.R. 4457 by Rep. Patrick J. Tiberi (R, OH-12) on April 10, 2014; Committee consideration by United States House Committee on Ways and Means

The America's Small Business Tax Relief Act of 2014 (H.R. 4457) was a bill that would amend section 179 of the Internal Revenue Code, which mostly affects small- to medium-sized businesses, to retroactively and permanently extend from January 1, 2014, increased the cap on the amount of investment that can be immediately deducted from taxable income. The bill would return the tax code to its 2013 status and make the change permanent.

The bill was introduced into the United States House of Representatives during the 113th United States Congress, but was not enacted into law.

== Background ==
In 2013, businesses could write-off the full cost of some capital investments up to $500,000 per investment and a total of $2 million. After that provision of the tax code expired, the limit was dropped to $25,000 per investment and a total of only $200,000.

== Provisions of the bill ==
This summary is based largely on the summary provided by the Congressional Research Service, a public domain source.

The America's Small Business Tax Relief Act of 2014 would amend the Internal Revenue Code, with respect to the expensing allowance for depreciable business property, to make permanent: (1) the increased $500,000 expensing allowance for such property, (2) the increased $2,000,000 threshold amount for such property over which the amount of the expensing allowance is reduced, (3) expensing of computer software, and (4) rules for the expensing of qualified real property (i.e., leasehold improvement, restaurant, and retail improvement property). The bill would allow an inflation adjustment to the dollar amounts of the expensing allowance for taxable years beginning after 2014. The bill would eliminate the exclusion of air conditioning and heating units as property eligible for the expensing allowance.

== Congressional Budget Office report ==
This summary is based largely on the summary provided by the Congressional Budget Office, as ordered reported by the House Committee on Ways and Means on April 29, 2014. This is a public domain source.

H.R. 4457 would amend section 179 of the Internal Revenue Code, which mostly affects small- to medium-sized businesses, to retroactively and permanently extend from January 1, 2014, increased limitations on the amount of investment that can be immediately deducted from taxable income. H.R. 4457 also indexes the limitations for inflation and expands the definition of property that qualifies for that immediate deduction.

Permanently extending to $500,000 the annual cost of property eligible for expensing under section 179, expanding the qualifying property eligible under section 179, and indexing the amounts for inflation, would allow firms to deduct immediately from their taxable income the full costs of up to $500,000 in investment of certain equipment from their taxable income, instead of spreading the costs out over time. The benefit of the immediate expensing phases out if total qualifying investment exceeds $2 million, indexed for inflation.

The staff of the Joint Committee on Taxation (JCT) estimates that enacting H.R. 4457 would reduce revenues, thus increasing federal deficits, by about $73 billion over the 2014-2024 period.

The Statutory Pay-As-You-Go Act of 2010 establishes budget-reporting and enforcement procedures for legislation affecting direct spending and revenues. Enacting H.R. 4457 would result in revenue losses in each year beginning in 2014.

JCT has determined that the bill contains no intergovernmental or private-sector mandates as defined in the Unfunded Mandates Reform Act.

== Procedural history ==
The America's Small Business Tax Relief Act of 2014 was introduced into the United States House of Representatives on April 10, 2014 by Rep. Patrick J. Tiberi (R, OH-12). The bill was referred to the United States House Committee on Ways and Means. It was reported (amended) on May 2, 2014 alongside House Report 113-432. The bill was scheduled to be considered on June 12, 2014.

== Debate and discussion ==
According to the Tax Foundation, "raising the Section 179 expensing limits to 2013 levels and making them permanent is a positive move." They argued that "the uncertainty created by having a temporary tax law that needs to be renewed periodically reduces its effectiveness in promoting business investments and economic growth."

The Association of Equipment Manufacturers (AEM) strongly supporting the bill. AEM President Dennis Slater said that "small businesses have been especially hard hit and still trying to recover from the Great Recession; permanent Section 179 expensing reduces uncertainty so owners can make longer-term business decisions that ensure their companies continue to grow and provide jobs. This legislation will help small businesses not only more easily reinvest in their businesses, but also invest in a stronger America."

Dan Danner, the president and CEO of the National Federation of Independent Business, argued that Congress could help small business by passing the bill since it would enable small businesses to "plan for the future, invest in the economy and hire new workers."

Rep. Sander Levin (D-MI) said he would vote against the bill because he thinks "voting permanent is counter-productive." Levin thought the bill would increase the deficit. Rep. Richard Neal (D-MA) also said he was opposed to the bill, but did favor extending the tax cut for two years.

The White House issued a veto threat against the bill.

== See also ==
- List of bills in the 113th United States Congress
