= National Federation of Independent Business =

Association of small businesses in the United States

National Federation Of Independent Business Inc
- Abbreviation: NFIB
- Formation: 1943; 83 years ago
- Type: 501(c)(6)
- Headquarters: Nashville
- Region served: United States
- President: Brad Close
- Revenue: $113 million USD (2023)
- Expenses: $124 million USD (2023)
- Website: nfib.com

NFIB FED PAC
- Formation: August 1, 1978; 48 years ago
- Type: Membership Organization political action committee
- Registration no.: C00101105
- Headquarters: Washington, DC
- Revenue: $998,969.12 USD (January 2023 to December 2024)
- Expenses: $971,136.95 USD (January 2023 to December 2024)

The National Federation of Independent Business (NFIB) is an association of small businesses in the United States. It is headquartered in Nashville, Tennessee, with offices in Washington, D.C., and all 50 state capitals. The stated goal of the NFIB is to advance the interests of small businesses.

Since 1990, it has donated $725,551 to Democratic candidates and party committees compared to $11,972,074 to Republican candidates and party committees. It was a key opponent of President Bill Clinton's attempt to reform American health care in 1993, as well as a lead plaintiff in the lawsuit to have the Affordable Care Act deemed unconstitutional. The NFIB has criticized both the Occupational Safety and Health Administration (OSHA) and the Environmental Protection Agency (EPA). The NFIB has lobbied against "click-to-cancel" rules (which would require companies to make cancellations as easy as the process to subscribe), as well as beneficial ownership rules (which would require companies to disclose their true owners).

== Activities and politics ==
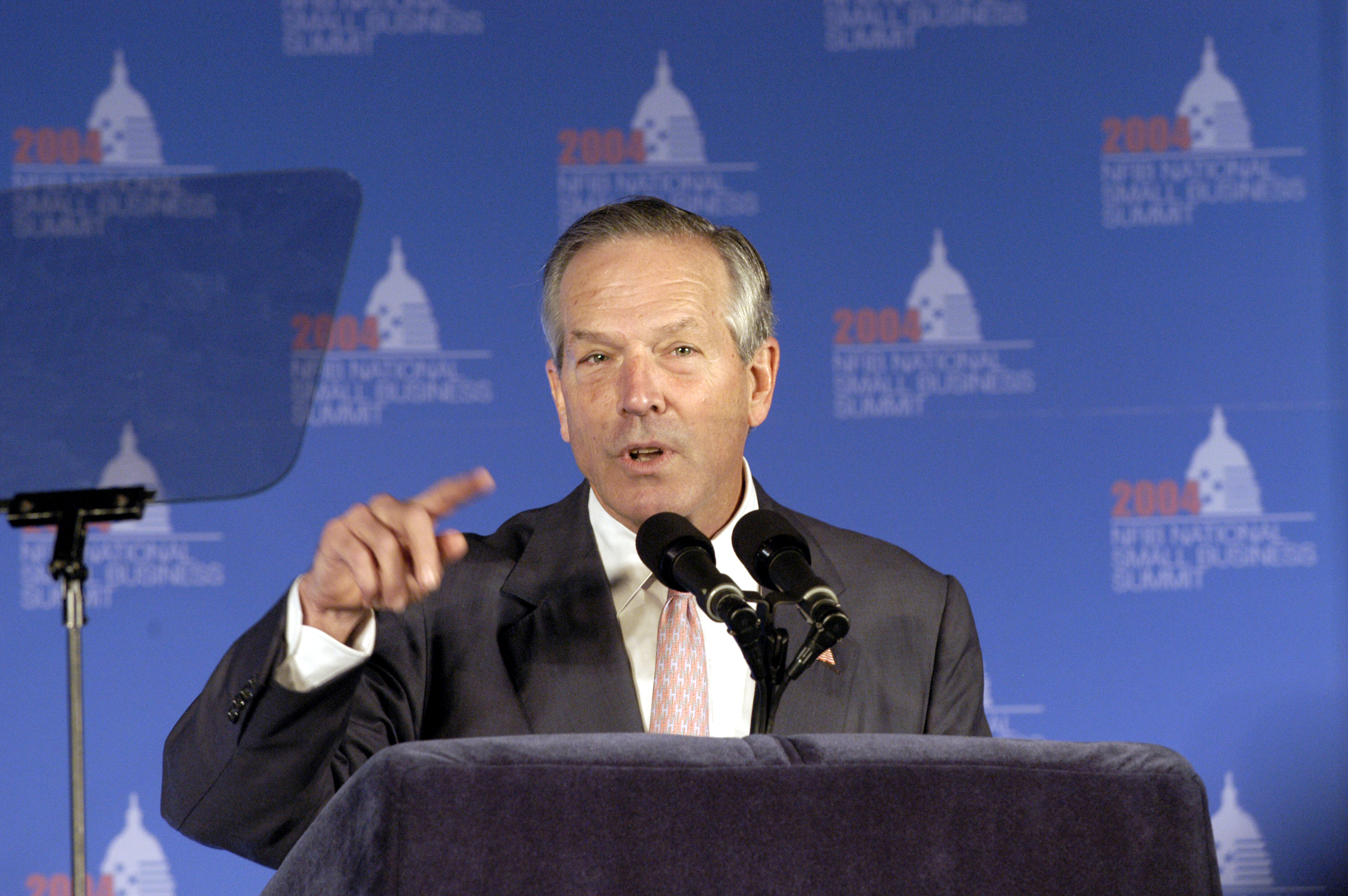
Commerce Secretary Donald Evans speaks at the NFIB Small Business Summit in 2004.

The Federation states it provides advocacy counsel on matters including legislation and taxes, as well as guidance to small business owners on management, operations, and marketing. It also provides information on legal issues and health care, and it hosts a podcast on various concerns facing small businesses.

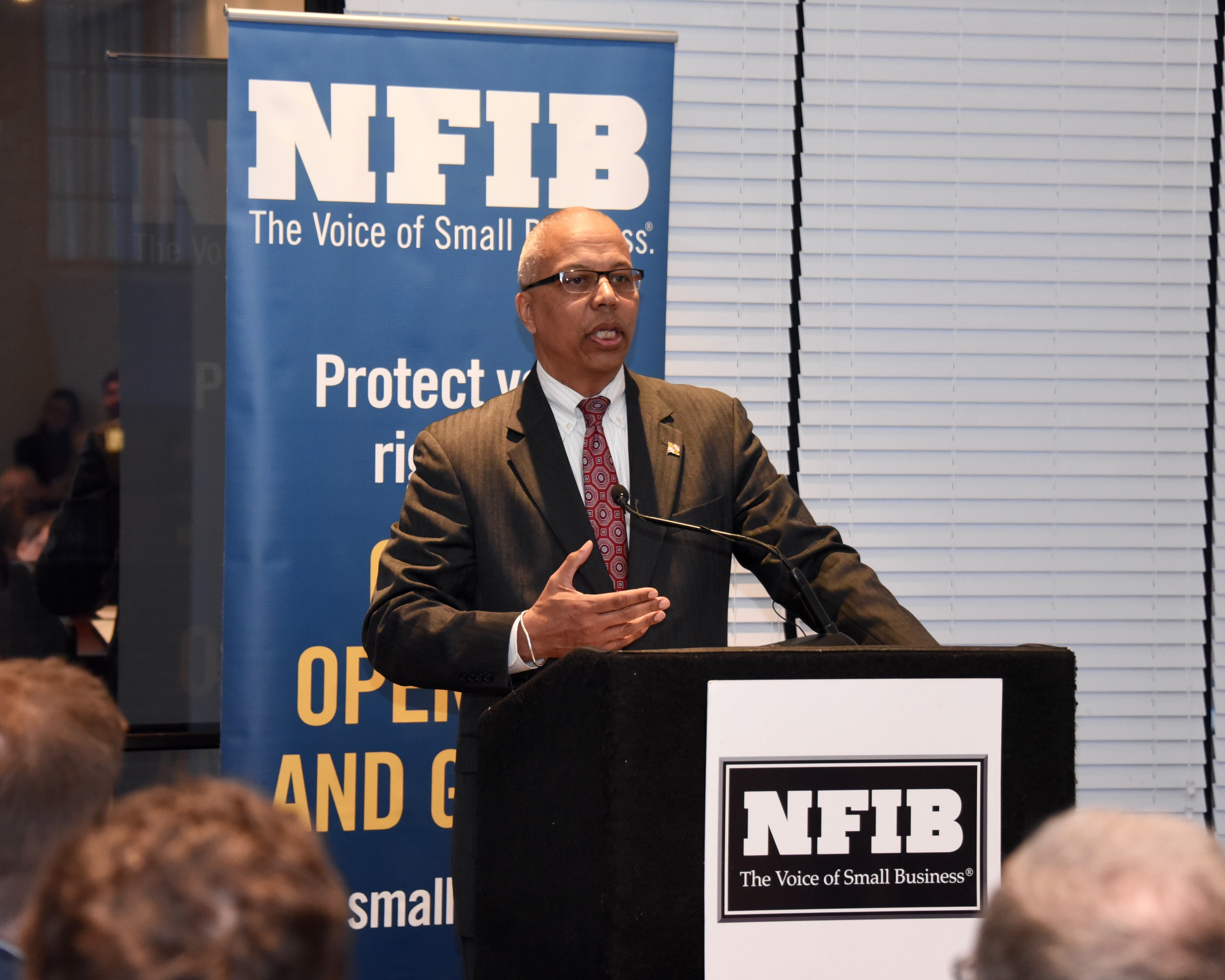
Maryland Lieutenant Governor Boyd Rutherford addresses an NFIB event in 2017.

On its website, the NFIB states that it is a "nonprofit, nonpartisan organization founded in 1943". In 2010, 25 of its members, all Republican, were elected to the 112th Congress.

In 2010, the NFIB became the lead plaintiff opposing the Patient Protection and Affordable Care Act health care reform legislation. The organization joined 26 states in the lawsuit challenging the constitutionality of the act. The case reached the Supreme Court, which issued its ruling on National Federation of Independent Business v. Sebelius on June 28, 2012, upholding most provisions of the act. Karl Rove's conservative Crossroads GPS PAC gave the NFIB $3.7 million to help fund the court fight.

The NFIB supported the America's Small Business Tax Relief Act of 2014 (H.R. 4457; 113th Congress), a bill that would amend section 179 of the Internal Revenue Code, which mostly affects small- to medium-sized businesses. The bill sought to retroactively and permanently extend, from January 1, 2014, increased limitations on the amount of investment that can be immediately deducted from taxable income. The bill would return the tax code to its 2013 status and make the change permanent. Dan Danner, the president and CEO at that time, argued that Congress could help small businesses by passing the bill, as it would enable them to "plan for the future, invest in the economy and hire new workers."

In 2017, the NFIB endorsed the confirmation of SCOTUS nominee Neil Gorsuch.

In 2021, it successfully sued OSHA before the Supreme Court to oppose a COVID-19 vaccine mandate for businesses, resulting in OSHA withdrawing the mandate.

In fiscal year 2022, the NFIB had total revenue of $105,848,770.

In October 2023, the federation reported a slight decline in small business optimism due to inflation and staffing concerns.

In October 2024, the NFIB, along with the Michigan Press Association, sued to block the U.S. Federal Trade Commission (FTC) from implementing its so-called "click-to-cancel" rule. This rule is a set of revisions to the FTC's Negative Option Rule that would require businesses to make the cancellation process for subscriptions, renewals, and free trials that convert to paid memberships as easy as the signup process, as well as to obtain proof of consent before billing customers for such services.

The NFIB sued to stop the federal government from enforcing the Corporate Transparency Act's beneficial ownership rules. The rules would have required foreign and domestic companies to disclose their true owners.

The NFIB filed an amicus brief in Ryan, LLC. v. Federal Trade Commission, "supporting a challenge to the FTC’s final rule banning noncompete agreements".

The NFIB filed a legal challenge to overturn 2024 Missouri Proposition A.

== Guardian of Small Business Award ==
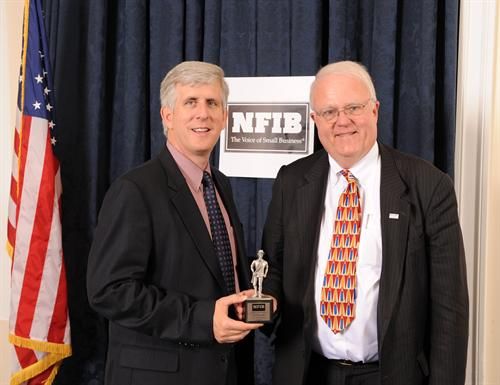
Todd Stottlemyer presents Jim Sensenbrenner with the Guardian of Small Business Award in 2008.

The NFIB presents the Guardian of Small Business Award to legislators who vote consistently with the organization's positions on key issues identified by small business owners.

== See also ==
- Union of Industrial and Employers' Confederations of Europe (UNICE, now BusinessEurope)
- European Association of Craft, Small and Medium-Sized Enterprises
- Canadian Federation of Independent Business
