= Save American Workers Act of 2013 =

Proposed United States law

- Long title: To amend the Internal Revenue Code of 1986 to repeal the 30-hour threshold for classification as a full-time employee for purposes of the employer mandate in the Patient Protection and Affordable Care Act and replace it with 40 hours.
- Announced in: the 113th United States Congress
- Sponsored by: Rep. Todd C. Young (R, IN-9)
- Number of co-sponsors: 111

Codification
- Acts affected: Internal Revenue Code of 1986, Patient Protection and Affordable Care Act

Legislative history
- Introduced in the House as H.R. 2575 by Rep. Todd C. Young (R, IN-9) on June 28, 2013; Committee consideration by United States House Committee on Ways and Means

The Save American Workers Act of 2013 (H.R. 2575) is a bill that would change how the Patient Protection and Affordable Care Act defines full-time worker, by raising the threshold for offering employer-provided insurance from a minimum of 30 to 40 work hours a week. This is in order to remove the incentive some companies may have to reduce their employees' hours in order to avoid the employer healthcare mandate.

The bill was introduced into the United States House of Representatives during the 113th United States Congress.

== Background ==
The Patient Protection and Affordable Care Act's employer mandate is a penalty that will be incurred by employers with more than 50 employees that do not offer health insurance to their full-time workers. This provision was included as a disincentive for employers considering dropping their current insurance plans once the insurance exchanges began operating as an alternative source of insurance. Proponents of the reform law wanted to address the parts of the healthcare system they believed to not be working well, while causing minimal disruption to those happy with the coverage they have. Lawmakers recognized that approximately 80% of Americans already have insurance, of whom 54% (44% of the total population) are covered directly or indirectly through an employer, and 29% (23% of the total population) are covered by the government—mainly though Medicare and Medicaid. While 73% of the total population reported themselves satisfied with their insurance situation, significant minorities, even among those that reported favorably, had medically-related financial troubles and/or dissatisfaction with aspects of their insurance coverage, especially among the poor and sick. The intent of the employer mandate (along with a grandfather clause in the ACA) is to help ensure that existing employer-sponsored insurance plans that people like will stay in place.

As no company with fewer than 50 full-time employees will face this penalty, many are concerned that the employer mandate creates a perverse incentive for business to employ people part-time instead of full-time. Several businesses and the State of Virginia have clarified the contracts of their part-time employees by adding a 29-hour-a-week cap, to reflect the 30-hour threshold for full-time hours, as defined by the law. Some labor market experts claim such shifts are not clearly attributable to the implementation of the ACA: pre-existing, long-term trends in working hours, and the effects of the Great Recession correlate with part-time working hour patterns. The impact of this provision on employers' decision-making is partially offset by other factors: offering healthcare helps attract and retain employees, while increasing productivity and reducing absenteeism; and to trade a smaller full-time workforce for a larger part-time work force carries costs of training and administration for a business. The number of employers with over 50 employees is relatively small, and more than 90% of these already offer insurance, so changes in employer plans from this provision are expected to be small. Workers who do not receive insurance from an employer plan would be able to purchase insurance on the exchanges.

Regardless of the rationale for maintaining existing insurance arrangements for those happy with them, most policy analysts (on both the right and left) are critical of the employer mandate provision on the policy merits. They argue that the perverse incentives regarding part-time hours, even if they do not change many existing insurance plans, are real and harmful; that the raised marginal cost of the 50th worker for businesses could limit companies' growth; that the costs of reporting and administration—the paperwork for businesses and the state enforcement—are not worth the trade-off of incentivizing the maintenance of current employer plans; and note that the employer mandate, unlike the individual mandate, is a non-essential part of the law. Some analysts have suggested that an alternate 'pay or play' version of the employer mandate would partially avoid these problems, by instead taxing business that do not offer insurance by a percentage of their payroll rather than using the 50-employee and 30-hour cut-offs. Furthermore, many healthcare policy analysts think it would be better to transition away from the employer-based system to systems (whether state- or market-based) where insurance is more portable and stable, and hence think that it is a bad idea to even try to maintain existing employer insurance systems. The effects of the provision have also generated vocal opposition from business interests and some unions not granted exemptions.

== Provisions of the bill ==
This summary is based largely on the summary provided by the Congressional Research Service, a public domain source.

The Save American Workers Act of 2014 would amend the Internal Revenue Code, as amended by the Patient Protection and Affordable Care Act, to redefine "full-time employee," for purposes of the mandate requiring employers to provide health care coverage for their employees, as an employee who is employed on average at least 40 hours of service a week (currently, at least 30 hours of service a week). The bill would make this Act applicable to months beginning after December 31, 2013.

== Congressional Budget Office report ==
This summary is based largely on the summary provided by the Congressional Budget Office, as ordered reported by the House Committee on Ways and Means on February 4, 2014. This is a public domain source.

H.R. 2575 would alter the calculation of the number of full-time equivalent employees for the purposes of determining which employers are subject to penalties under the Affordable Care Act (ACA) for not offering health insurance for their employees or for offering insurance that does not meet certain criteria specified in the law. In addition, the legislation would change the definition of "full-time employee" used for the calculation of those penalties. Specifically, the bill would raise the threshold that defines full-time employment from 30 hours per week under current law to 40 hours per week.

Those changes to the employer responsibility requirements of the ACA would reduce the number of employers assessed penalties and lower the penalties assessed against employers that do not offer insurance (or offer insurance that does not meet certain criteria) and that have at least one full-time employee receiving a subsidy through a health insurance exchange. As a result, the largest budgetary effect of H.R. 2575 would be to reduce the amount of penalties collected from employers.

As a result of those changes in who would pay penalties and what amounts they would have to pay, the Congressional Budget Office (CBO) and the staff of the United States Congress Joint Committee on Taxation (JCT) estimate that enacting H.R. 2575 would change the sources of health insurance coverage for some people. Specifically, in most years over the 2015-2024 period, the CBO and JCT estimate that the legislation would:

- Reduce the number of people receiving employment-based coverage—by about 1 million people;
- Increase the number of people obtaining coverage through Medicaid, the Children's Health Insurance Program (CHIP), or health insurance exchanges—by between 500,000 and 1 million people; and
- Increase the number of uninsured—by less than 500,000 people.

As a consequence of the changes in penalties and in people's sources of insurance coverage, the CBO and JCT estimate that enacting H.R. 2575 would increase budget deficits by $25.4 billion over the 2015-2019 period and by $73.7 billion over the 2015-2024 period. The 2015-2024 total is the net of an increase of $83.0 billion in on-budget costs and $9.3 billion in off-budget savings (the latter attributable to increased revenues). Pay-as-you-go procedures apply because enacting the legislation would affect direct spending and revenues.

JCT has determined that H.R. 2575 contains no intergovernmental or private-sector mandates as defined in the Unfunded Mandates Reform Act.

== Procedural history ==
The Save American Workers Act of 2013 was introduced into the United States House of Representatives on June 28, 2013 by Rep. Todd C. Young (R, IN-9). The bill was referred to the United States House Committee on Ways and Means. It was reported (amendment) by the committee alongside House Report 113-386.

The White House threatened to veto the bill.

== Debate and discussion ==
Republicans argued that this bill is necessary because the ACA's definition of full-time as 30 or more hours a week has led to some employers reducing employees' hours to under 30, which lowers the paychecks of those workers by as much as 25 percent.

Rep. Michael C. Burgess (R-TX) said that the ACA "fundamentally changed the labor law in this country, creating a new standard called the 30-hour workweek." He argued that the result of this change was cut hours for workers and cut productivity, calling the whole situation an example of "what an onerous government regulation can and will do: suppress innovation and disadvantage our businesses." Burgess also argued that this bill is a small fix to the ACA rather than an attempt to repeal it again.

Rep. Louise Slaughter (D-NY) opposed the bill on the basis of the CBO's report, arguing that "this legislation would increase the deficit by $74 billion and force 1 million people to lose their sponsored healthcare coverage and increase the number of uninsured."

== See also ==
- List of bills in the 113th United States Congress
