= National Association for Behavioral Healthcare =

Non-profit organization in USA

- Formerly: The National Association of Psychiatric Health Systems
- Type: Nonprofit organization
- Industry: Psychiatry, Medicine
- Founded: 1933; 93 years ago
- Headquarters: Washington, D.C.
- Key people: Frank A. Ghinassi (President and CEO)
- Website: https://www.nabh.org/

The National Association for Behavioral Healthcare (NABH) is a non-profit organization based in Washington, D.C. and established in 1933. NABH educates health care providers on issues like behavioral health, mental disorders, and substance use.

== Overview ==
NABH was founded in 1933 as the National Association of Private Psychiatric Hospitals (NAPPH). In 1993 NAPPH changed its name to the National Association of Psychiatric Health Systems (NAPHS).

In April 1999, the Association of Behavioral Group Practices (ABGP) merged with NAPHS.

In 2018, the National Association of Psychiatric Health Systems changed its name to National Association for Behavioral Healthcare.

NABH is an industry association that actively lobbies on behalf of America's largest psychiatric hospital chains. Members include "more than 800 specialty psychiatric hospitals, general hospital psychiatric and addiction treatment units, residential treatment centers, youth services organizations, and other providers of care."

NABH issues policy guidelines with regard to mental and behavioral health issues at the state and federal level.

Frank A. Ghinassi serves as the current president and CEO of the organization.

The NABH hosts annual conferences dedicated to mental health policy in the United States.
