= Essential health benefits =

Benefits covered by insurance in the US

In the United States, essential health benefits (EHBs) are a set of ten benefits, defined under the Affordable Care Act (ACA) of 2010, that must be covered by individually-purchased health insurance and plans in small-group markets both inside and outside of health insurance marketplaces. Large-group health plans, self-insured ERISA plans, and ERISA-governed multi-employer welfare arrangements that are not subject to state insurance law are exempted from the requirement.

== Definition ==
The Affordable Care Act (ACA) set forth the following ten categories of essential health benefits, at Section 1302(b)(1) of the ACA, codified at 42 U.S.C. § 18022(b):

1. Ambulatory patient services. [outpatient care]
2. Emergency services.
3. Hospitalization. [inpatient care]
4. Maternity and newborn care
5. Mental health and substance use disorder services, including behavioral health treatment.
6. Prescription drugs.
7. Rehabilitative and habilitative services and devices.
8. Laboratory services
9. Preventive and wellness services and chronic disease management;
10. Pediatric services, including oral and vision care.

Health insurance plans must cover these benefits i.e. they must cap people's out-of-pocket spending and must not limit annual and lifetime coverage.

== Interpretation ==
The essential health benefits are a minimum federal standard and "states may require that qualified health plans sold in state health insurance exchanges also cover state-mandated benefits." The act gives "considerable discretion" to the Secretary of Health and Human Services to determine, through regulation, what specific services within these classes are essential. However, the Act provides certain parameters for the secretary to consider. The secretary (1) must "ensure that such essential health benefits reflect an appropriate balance among the categories ... so that benefits are not unduly weighted toward any category"; (2) may "not make coverage decisions, determine reimbursement rates, establish incentive programs, or design benefits in ways that discriminate against individuals because of their age, disability, or expected length of life"; (3) must take into account "the health care needs of diverse segments of the population, including women, children, persons with disabilities, and other groups"; and (4) must ensure that essential benefits "not be subject to denial to individuals against their wishes on the basis of the individuals’ age or expected length of life or the individuals' present or predicted disability, degree of medical dependency, or quality of life."

According to a Commonwealth Fund report in 2011:

As it stands, federal regulations for 2014 and 2015 do not establish a single, nationally uniform package of health services. Instead, the U.S. Department of Health and Human Services (HHS) gave states discretion to determine the specific benefits they deem essential. This approach was well-received by many state officials, who valued the opportunity to tailor benefit standards to reflect state priorities, and by insurers, who retained more control over benefit design. Groups representing consumers and providers were less supportive, however, expressing concern that the degree of flexibility found in the rules undermines the law's promise of consistent, meaningful coverage.

== Law history ==
Coverage of essential health benefits was first required by the 2010 Patient Protection and Affordable Care Act (PPACA or ACA), which was a major piece of health care reform legislation. The EHB provisions of the ACA was an amendment to the Public Health Service Act. Lavarreda, director of health insurance studies for the UCLA Center for Health Policy Research, explained that before the ACA's passage, U.S. health insurance sector experienced "a race to the bottom, with insurers cutting benefits to lower premiums." The establishment of essential health benefits "set a standard for insurance. Anything below that is not true health insurance." The EHB requirement came into effect on January 1, 2014.

Revision and repeal of essential health benefits coverage was proposed in the Republican part American Health Care Act of 2017. House Freedom Caucus members lobbied during legislation discussion with House Speaker Paul Ryan to remove EHBs as a condition for approval of the AHCA bill.

== Comparison with minimum essential coverage ==
Essential health benefits should not be confused with minimum essential coverage (MEC). MEC is the minimum amount of coverage that an individual must carry to meet the individual health insurance mandate, while EHBs are a set of benefits that qualified health plans (QHPs) must offer. MEC is a low threshold; many forms of coverage that do not provide essential health benefits are nevertheless considered minimum essential coverage.

== See also ==
- Broccoli mandate

== Sources ==
- Sara Rosenbaum, Joel Teitelbaum & Katherine Hayes, The Essential Health Benefits Provisions of the Affordable Care Act: Implications for People with Disabilities, Commonwealth Fund (March 2011).
- Justin Giovannelli, Kevin W. Lucia & Sabrina Corlette, Implementing the Affordable Care Act: Revisiting the ACA’s Essential Health Benefits Requirements Commonwealth Fund (October 2014).
