= American Health Care Act of 2017 =

Proposed U.S. law

- Long title: An Act to provide for reconciliation pursuant to title II of the concurrent resolution on the budget for fiscal year 2017
- Acronyms (colloquial): AHCA
- Nicknames: Trumpcare, Ryancare, Obamacare Lite, Wealthcare
- Announced in: the 115th United States Congress

Codification
- Acts affected: Affordable Care Act, Medicare Access and CHIP Reauthorization Act of 2015, Social Security Act, Balanced Budget and Emergency Deficit Control Act of 1985, Public Health Service Act

Legislative history
- Introduced in the House as H.R. 1628 by Diane Black (R-TN) on March 20, 2017; Committee consideration by House Energy and Commerce Committee: passed as "Budget Reconciliation Legislative Recommendations Relating to Repeal and Replace of the Patient Protection and Affordable Care Act" on March 9, 2017 (31–23); House Ways and Means Committee: passed on March 9, 2017 as "Budget Reconciliation Legislative Recommendations Relating to Repeal and Replace of Health-Related Tax Policy" (23–16), "Repeal of Certain Consumer Taxes" (24–16), "Repeal of Tanning Tax" (24–15), "Remuneration from Certain Insurers"(23–16), and "Repeal of Net Investment Income Tax" (24–15); House Budget Committee: passed as "American Health Care Act of 2017" on March 16, 2017 (19–17); House Rules Committee: passed with amendments on March 24, 2017 (9–3) and with further amendments on May 3, 2017 (8–3); Passed the House on May 4, 2017 (217–213)

The House bill passed by a 217–213 vote with twenty Republican representatives voting no. Republican "aye" Republican "no" Democratic "no" Republican "abstain"

The American Health Care Act of 2017 (often shortened to the AHCA or nicknamed Ryancare) was a bill in the 115th United States Congress. The bill, which was passed by the United States House of Representatives but failed the United States Senate, would have partially repealed the Affordable Care Act (ACA).

Republican Party leaders had campaigned on the repeal of the ACA since its passage in 2010, and the 2016 elections gave Republicans unified control of Congress and the presidency for the first time since the ACA came into effect. Upon the start of the 115th Congress, Congressional Republicans sought to pass a partial repeal of the ACA using the reconciliation process, which allows legislation to bypass the Senate filibuster and pass with a simple majority in the Senate. With the support of President Donald Trump, House Republicans introduced the AHCA in early 2017, and the bill passed the House in a close vote on May 4, 2017. All House Democrats, along with several members of the centrist Tuesday Group and some other House Republicans, voted against the AHCA. The bill would have repealed the individual mandate and the employer mandate, dramatically cut Medicaid spending and eligibility, eliminated tax credits for healthcare costs, abolished some taxes on high earners, and altered rules concerning pre-existing conditions and essential health benefits.

Senate Republicans initially sought to pass the Better Care Reconciliation Act of 2017 (BCRA), a healthcare bill containing provisions largely similar to those of the AHCA. The BCRA was never voted on in its original form due to opposition from several Republican senators. Senate Majority Leader Mitch McConnell instead sought to pass the Health Care Freedom Act (HCFA), which was colloquially referred to as a "skinny repeal" by Republicans since it would only repeal the individual mandate and the employer mandate. On July 27, the Senate rejected the HCFA in a 51-to-49 vote, with Republican senators Susan Collins, Lisa Murkowski, and John McCain joining with all Senate Democrats in voting against it. In September 2017, some Republican senators pushed a renewed effort to repeal the ACA, but their bill never received a vote in the Senate. The 115th Congress ultimately did not pass an ACA repeal bill, though it did pass the Tax Cuts and Jobs Act of 2017, which repealed the individual mandate. The AHCA was a significant issue in the midterm elections the following year, which saw the election of a Democratic House majority and defeat of several of the bill's supporters for re-election. Members of Congress who voted for the AHCA were more likely to lose their re-election bids.

The nonpartisan Congressional Budget Office projected that the AHCA would have increased the number of uninsured people by 23 million over 10 years, but would have decreased the federal budget deficit by $119 billion over the same period. Polling consistently showed that the AHCA was deeply unpopular with the American population during and after its evaluations in Congress. Business Insider stated that the AHCA was "the least popular major bill in decades", and major medical organizations, including the American Medical Association and the American Academy of Pediatrics, strongly condemned the bill and excoriated its supporters in Congress.

== Background ==
The ACA (colloquially called "Obamacare"), a major reform of health care in the United States, was passed in 2010 by the 111th Congress and signed by President Barack Obama in 2010 after nearly a year of bipartisan debate. The ACA draws from many conservative ideas proposed by The Heritage Foundation in the 1980s and 1990s, which included a mandate that all have coverage to prevent "free riders", subsidy tax credits, and Medicaid reform. Heritage proposed funding program costs by taxing health insurance premiums paid by employers on behalf of workers (presently exempt from income), which would have affected all workers covered by employers, while ACA primarily relied on tax rate increases on roughly the top 5% of households.

From Obama's inauguration in January 2009 until the November 2010 elections, both houses of Congress and the presidency were controlled by the Democratic Party. During the 2012 presidential election, Republican nominee Mitt Romney, running against Obama, promised to repeal the ACA, despite its similarity to Romneycare. After Romney's defeat, the ACA remained in effect for the duration of Obama's presidency despite Republican efforts to repeal it. In the 114th Congress, Republicans passed a bill that would have repealed much of the ACA, but the bill was vetoed by Obama. After winning the 2016 presidential election, President Donald Trump promised to "repeal and replace" the ACA with a new law. The 2016 elections left Republicans in control of the executive and legislative branches of the U.S. government, but with 52 seats in the 100-member Senate, Republicans would still have to rely on at least some Senate Democrats to overcome a filibuster. However, Senate rules provide for a special budget rule called reconciliation, which allows certain budget-related bills to bypass the filibuster and be enacted with a simple majority vote. Republican leaders were seeking to pass the AHCA through the Senate by using the reconciliation rule.

In 2015, U.S. health care costs were approximately $3.2 trillion, or nearly $10,000 per person on average. Major categories of expense include hospital care (32%), physician and clinical services (20%), and prescription drugs (10%). U.S. costs in 2016 were substantially higher than other OECD countries, at 17.2% GDP versus 12.4% GDP for the next most expensive country (Switzerland). For scale, a 5% GDP difference represents about $1 trillion or $3,000 per person. Some of the many reasons cited for the cost differential with other countries include: Higher administrative costs of a private system with multiple payment processes; higher costs for the same products and services; more expensive volume/mix of services with higher usage of more expensive specialists; aggressive treatment of very sick elderly versus palliative care; less use of government intervention in pricing; and higher income levels driving greater demand for health care. Healthcare costs are a fundamental driver of health insurance costs, which leads to coverage affordability challenges for millions of families. There is ongoing debate whether the current law (ACA/Obamacare) and the Republican alternatives (AHCA and BCRA) do enough to address the cost challenge.

== Overview ==
Both the Republican House AHCA and Senate BCRA bills have proposed major reforms relative to current law (ACA) that would substantially reduce the number of persons covered, moderately lower the budget deficit over a decade, reverse the tax increases on the top 5% (mainly the top 1%), dramatically cut Medicaid payments (25-35%) that benefit lower-income persons, and expand choice by allowing lower quality insurance to be purchased at lower prices for the young and middle-aged.

Key provisions of the Republican Senate BCRA take effect over several years and include:

- Eliminate employer and individual mandates and related penalties, substituting a one-time premium increase of 30% for persons that were without coverage previously for a specified time period (63 days).
- States would be allowed more flexibility in establishing essential health benefits (i.e., insurance policy content).
- Change tax credit/subsidy formulas used to help pay for insurance premiums (initially age-based, later modified to income-based) and eliminate a "cost-sharing subsidy" that reduced out-of-pocket costs.
- Provide funding to health insurers to stabilize premiums and promote marketplace participation, via a "Long-Term State Stability and Innovation Program" with features analogous to a high-risk pool.
- Reduce income ceiling used for Medicaid eligibility and substitute a tax credit for those below 100% of the poverty line.
- Reduce Medicaid payments relative to current law, by capping the growth in per-enrollee payments for non-disabled children and non-disabled adults, by using a lower inflation index.
- Repeal taxes on high-income earners established under ACA/Obamacare, repeal the annual fee on health insurance providers, and delay the excise tax on high premium health plans (the so-called "Cadillac tax").
- Allow insurers to charge premiums up to five times as much to older people vs. young people, instead of three times, unless the state sets a different limit.
- Remove federal cap on the share of premiums that may go to insurers' administrative costs and profits (the "minimum medical loss ratio").

Public opinion regarding the Republican House (AHCA) and Senate (BCRA) bills was very negative (i.e., opposed), with approval ratings between 12 and 38%, and disapproval ratings between 41% and 62%, measured between March and June 2017 (refer to "Specific poll results" table below for sources). Views were split along party lines. For example, the monthly Kaiser Family Foundation health tracking poll for May 2017 indicated that:

- More view the Republican AHCA unfavorably (55%) than favorably (31%).
- Views are split along party lines, with % in favor of AHCA: Democrats 8%, Independents 30%, Republicans 67%.
- Although historically more people viewed the current law (ACA/"Obamacare") unfavorably than favorably, in May 2017 more had a favorable view (49%) than unfavorable (42%).
- More favorably view the ACA/Obamacare (49%) than the Republican AHCA (31%).

Health care experts from across the political spectrum – liberal, moderate, and conservative – agreed that the House Republican health care bill was unworkable and suffered from fatal flaws, although specific objections varied depending on ideological perspective. Experts agreed that the bill fell far short of the goals laid forth by President Donald Trump during his 2016 campaign – "Affordable coverage for everyone; lower deductibles and health care costs; better care; and zero cuts to Medicaid" – because the bill was (1) "almost certain" to reduce overall health care coverage and increase deductibles and (2) would phase out the Medicaid expansion. Among the key concerns identified by health-care experts were that (1) the tax credits funded at the level proposed in the bill are insufficient to pay for individual insurance, and could lead to Americans dropping out of the health care market; (2) the bill's elimination of the ACA's community rating provision (barring insurance companies from charging older people more than three times what they charge younger people) would increase cost disparities between age groups and would increase premiums for Americans more prone to illness; (3) the dropping of healthy people from the health insurance market (adverse selection) could lead to insurer "death spirals" that would decrease choice; and (4) the phaseout of the Medicaid expansion was likely to result in a loss of healthcare for poorer Americans.

== Estimated impact of the Republican AHCA and BCRA ==
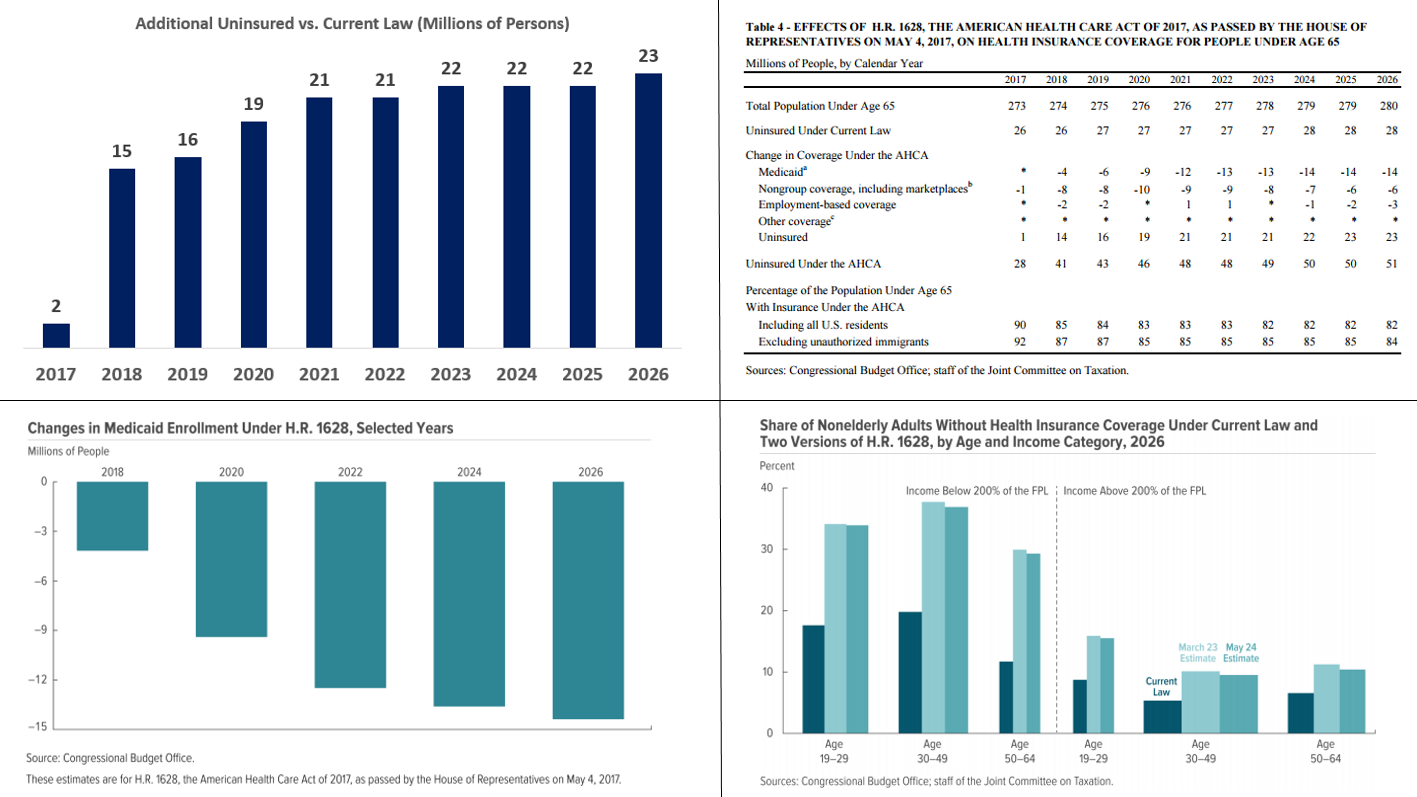
CBO estimated in May 2017 that under the Republican AHCA, about 23 million fewer people would have health insurance in 2026, compared with current law.

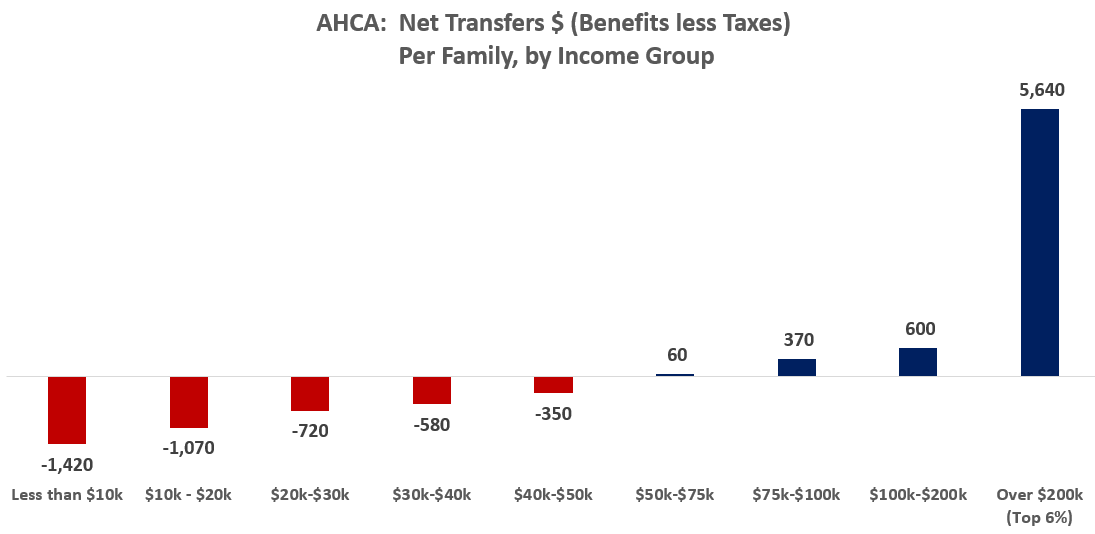
AHCA (Republican healthcare bill) impact on income distribution, as of the year 2022. Net benefits would go to families with over $50,000 income on average, with net costs to those below $50,000.

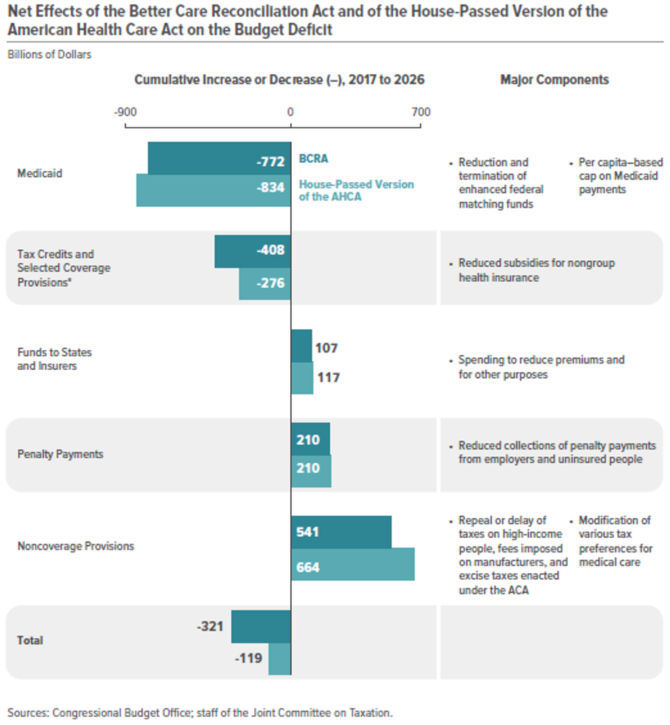
Impact on the budget deficit of the Republican healthcare bills (AHCA and BCRA). Cuts to Medicaid more than offset tax cuts, resulting in moderate deficit reduction.

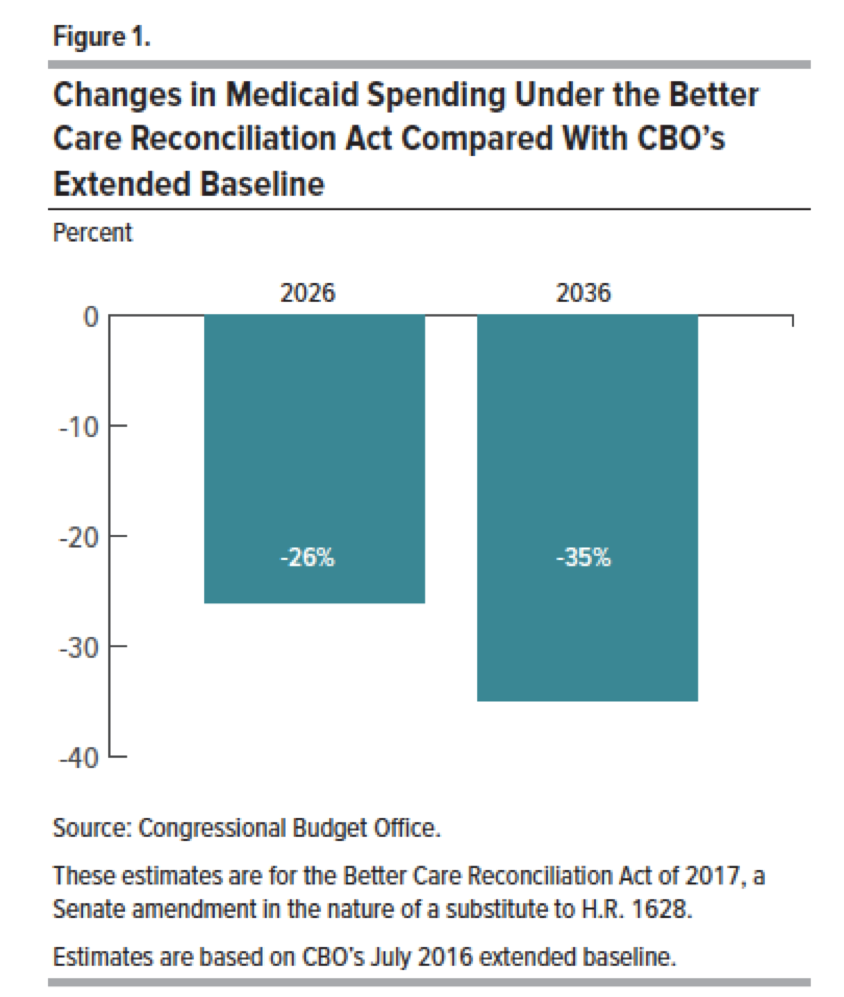
Changes in Medicaid Spending Under the Better Care Reconciliation Act Compared With CBO's Extended Baseline

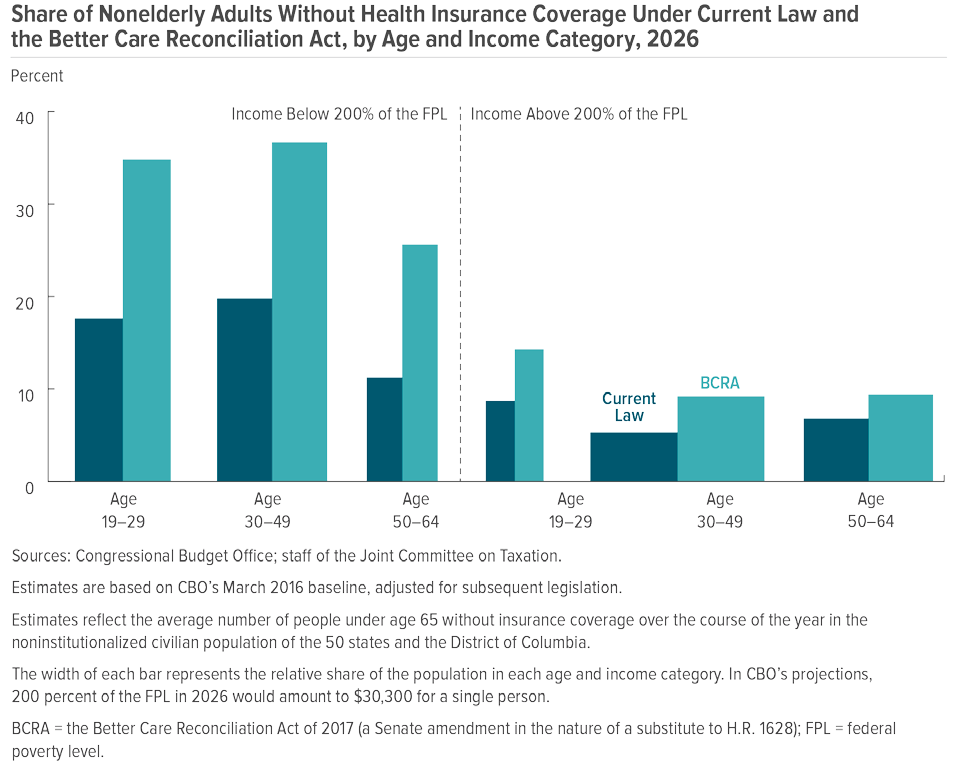
Share of Nonelderly Adults Without Health Insurance Coverage Under Current Law and the Better Care Reconciliation Act, by Age and Income Category, 2026

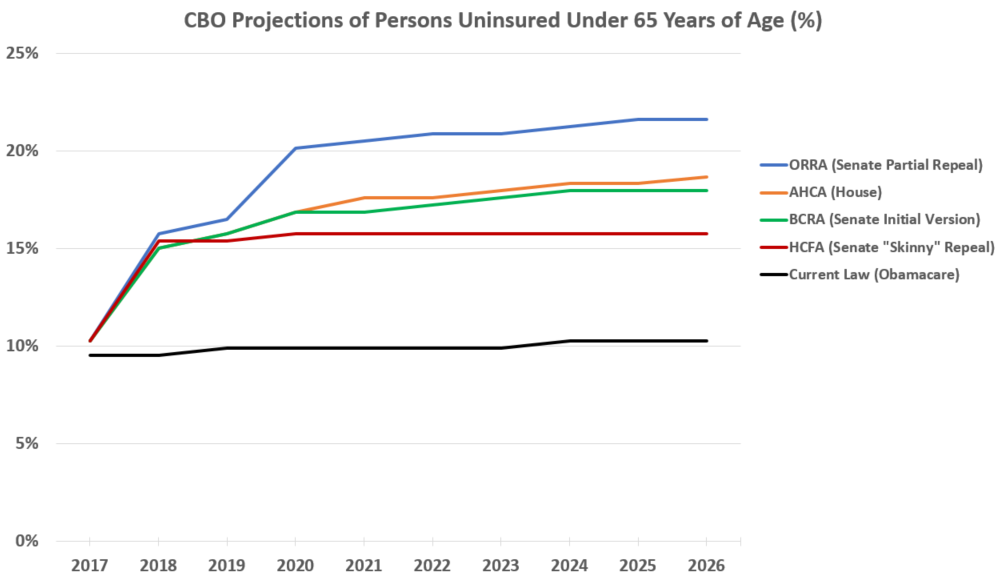
CBO projections of persons without health insurance under 65 years of age (%) under various legislative proposals and current law

The nonpartisan Congressional Budget Office has evaluated ("scored") the AHCA (initial and revised) and BCRA with respect to health insurance coverage, impact on the annual budget deficit, cost of insurance, and quality of insurance (i.e., the actuarial value, or percent of costs a given policy is expected to cover). Other groups have evaluated some of these elements, as well as the distributional impact of the tax changes by income level and impact on job creation. The results of these analyses are as follows:

=== Health insurance coverage ===
According to each of the CBO scores, passage of the Republican bills would result in a dramatic reduction in the number of persons with health insurance, relative to current law.

- Persons with healthcare insurance coverage would be reduced by 14 million in 2018, 21 million in 2020, and 24 million in 2026 relative to current law.
- In 2018, most of the reduction would be caused by the elimination of the penalties for the individual mandate, both directly and indirectly. Later reductions would be due to reductions in Medicaid enrollment, elimination of the individual mandate penalty, subsidy reduction, and higher costs for some persons.
- By 2026, an estimated 49 million people would be uninsured under the Senate BCRA, versus 28 million under current law.

==== Non-CBO coverage estimates ====
- According to a report viewed by Politico, the White House Office of Management and Budget's own analysis of the AHCA estimated that 26 million people would lose coverage over the next decade if enacted. According to White House Communications Director Michael Dubke, the analysis tried to use similar methodology as the CBO.
- Other individuals and organizations such as the Brookings Institution and S&P estimated sizable coverage losses due to the AHCA.
- According to a report published by the Center on Budget and Policy Priorities, the legislation would lead to 3 million more children (defined as persons under 18 years old) losing healthcare coverage.

=== Budget deficit ===
CBO has evaluated the impact on the budget deficit in each of its scores, generally finding a moderate reduction relative to current law:

- CBO AHCA March 13: The AHCA would reduce the deficit relative to current law by $337 billion over a decade. Approximately $1.2 trillion less would be spent over that time, while $900 billion less in tax revenue would be collected. Medicaid spending would be cut considerably. Taxes on the roughly top 5% of income-earners under current law would considerably drop.
- CBO AHCA Revised March 24: In negotiations after the initial report, the law was modified such that the CBO estimated the deficit reduction would total about $150 billion over a decade.
- CBO BCRA June 26: A reduction of $321 billion over a decade.

For scale, CBO has estimated that the U.S. will add approximately $9.4 trillion to the debt total over the 2018-2027 period, based on laws in place as of January 2017. The $321 billion therefore represents a reduction of about 3.5% of the total debt increase over the decade, while the $150 billion is about 1.6%.

=== Insurance costs and quality ===
There are many variables that affect premiums, deductibles, and out-of-pocket amounts, including (among others) age and health of plan participants, availability of subsidies, funding for high-risk pools, required insurance coverage elements, lifetime limits, maximum ratio of prices charged to older persons versus younger, and the quality of insurance offered. Regarding quality, the "actuarial value" is an estimate of the percentage of total cost that a particular insurance plan is expected to cover. CBO reported that:

- CBO AHCA March 13: Insurance premiums would rise initially relative to current law, but would be reduced in the future moderately: "Starting in 2020, the increase in average premiums from repealing the individual mandate penalties would be more than offset by the combination of several factors that would decrease those premiums: grants to states from the Patient and State Stability Fund (which CBO and JCT expect to largely be used by states to limit the costs to insurers of enrollees with very high claims); the elimination of the requirement for insurers to offer plans covering certain percentages of the cost of covered benefits; and a younger mix of enrollees. By 2026, average premiums for single policyholders in the nongroup market under the legislation would be roughly 10 percent lower than under current law..."
- CBO AHCA March 13: Premium changes would vary significantly by age: "Under the legislation, insurers would be allowed to generally charge five times more for older enrollees than younger ones rather than three times more as under current law, substantially reducing premiums for young adults and substantially raising premiums for older people." This would lead to a mix of younger enrollees, one of the reasons for the lower overall premiums over the longer-term.
- CBO BCRA June 26: "In 2020, average premiums for benchmark plans for single individuals would be about 30 percent lower than under current law. A combination of factors would lead to that decrease—most important, the smaller share of benefits paid for by the benchmark plans and federal funds provided to directly reduce premiums. That share of services covered by insurance would be smaller because the benchmark plan under this legislation would have an actuarial value of 58 percent beginning in 2020. That value is slightly below the actuarial value of 60 percent for "bronze" plans currently offered in the marketplaces."
- CBO BCRA June 26: "Under this legislation, starting in 2020, the premium for a silver plan would typically be a relatively high percentage of income for low-income people. The deductible for a plan with an actuarial value of 58 percent would be a significantly higher percentage of income—also making such a plan unattractive, but for a different reason. As a result, despite being eligible for premium tax credits, few low-income people would purchase any plan..."
- CBO BCRA June 26: CBO has provided a summary (table #5 on page 48) that compares premiums under current law (ACA) with the BCRA, for different ages and income levels, for bronze and silver plans. For example, a single individual 40 years old with annual income of $56,800 (375% of poverty level) would pay $5,000 for a bronze plan under BCRA vs. $5,500 under current law, but receives a lower actuarial value plan of 58 versus 60. For that person, silver plans would be basically identical in terms of cost and quality. Relative to current law, persons aged 64 years old would pay considerably more for either a bronze or silver plan under BCRA, while a 21 year old would pay considerably less under BCRA, due in part to relaxing the rules on how much more older persons can be charged relative to younger.

==== Non-CBO cost estimates ====
- The Chief Actuary of Centers for Medicare and Medicaid Services of the Department of Health and Human Services released a report on June 13, 2017 providing their estimates of the legislation's impact. They estimated that gross premiums would decrease by 13%, but net premiums, the amount paid by consumers after federal subsidies, would increase by 5% by 2026.

=== Taxation and income inequality ===
The current law (ACA) established two taxes on high-income individuals (defined as income over $200,000 for individuals or $250,000 for couples, roughly the top 6% of earners), via a 0.9% Medicare payroll surtax on earnings over that threshold and a 3.8% tax on net investment income. The latter tax is steeply progressive, with the top 1% paying 90% of the tax, as investment income is highly concentrated with the wealthy. The ACA also established a penalty tax (related to the individual mandate) for individuals without adequate insurance, an excise tax on employers with 50 or more workers who offer insufficient coverage, annual fees on health insurance providers, and the "Cadillac tax" (yet to be implemented as of 2017) on generous employer-sponsored health plans. Combined with subsidies that primarily benefit low-income households, the law significantly reduced income inequality after taxes and transfers.

The Republican bills (AHCA and BCRA) essentially repeal all of the taxes, penalties and fees and postpone the "Cadillac tax" further. The Tax Policy Center estimated in March 2017 that the AHCA would significantly reduce taxes for the wealthy, with those IRS tax units (an approximation for families) earning over $200,000 per year (the top 6%) receiving 70.6% of the benefit or a reduction of $5,680 in annual taxes on average. Those with incomes over $1 million (the top 0.4%) would see a tax decrease of $51,410 on average, receiving 46% of the benefit. In general, those with incomes over $50,000 would see a tax cut, while those with income below $50,000 would see a tax increase. Those with income below $10,000 would see a tax cut as well, but this benefit would be offset overall by reductions in Medicaid availability. The effects overall would worsen income inequality.

The Center on Budget and Policy Priorities (CBPP) reported that "The House bill would represent the largest transfer in modern U.S. history from low- and moderate-income people to the very wealthy." CBPP also wrote: "Millionaires would gain roughly $40 billion in tax cuts annually...roughly equivalent to the $38 billion that 32 million households in poverty would lose from cuts to their tax credits and Medicaid."

=== Medicaid ===
Medicaid is the U.S. program for low-income children, adults, seniors and people with disabilities, covering one in five Americans. It is the primary payer of nursing home care. The ACA (current law) expanded Medicaid eligibility; 31 states and the District of Columbia implemented the expansion. Approximately 41% of Medicaid enrollees are white, 25% are Hispanic, and 22% are black. The proportion of white recipients in key swing states are 67% in Ohio, 59% in Michigan, and 58% in Pennsylvania. About 48% of recipients are children (18 or under).

Most of the cost savings (deficit reduction) under AHCA and BCRA is due to reductions in Medicaid spending and coverage relative to current law. CBO estimated that there would be 15 million fewer Medicaid enrollees relative to current law by 2026, the largest component of the reduced coverage discussed above. CBO estimated that Medicaid spending under BCRA would be 26% lower in 2026 and 35% lower in 2036 relative to current law. This would reduce Medicaid spending in 2036 from 2.4% GDP under current law to 1.6% GDP. The reductions are driven by reduced funding to states for those who became covered under the Medicaid expansion in the current law (ACA), reducing the inflation index used to compute per-enrollee payments to states, and eliminating coverage mandates. While the nominal spending amounts continue to rise but at a slower pace, adjusted for inflation the amounts are actually cut moderately relative to 2017 levels.

=== Jobs ===
According to researchers at the Milken Institute School of Public Health at George Washington University, the AHCA legislation would lead to a loss of 924,000 jobs by 2026. The group also studied the BCRA, which would cost an estimated 1.45 million jobs by 2026, including over 900,000 in healthcare. The stimulus effects from tax cuts would initially create jobs, but would be offset by the larger declines in spending as the various parts of the law take effect. Further, gross state products would be $162 billion lower in 2026. States that expanded Medicaid would bear the brunt of the economic impact, as government funds would be reduced more significantly.

=== Exchange stability ===
Under both the ACA (current law) and the AHCA, CBO reported that the health exchange marketplaces would remain stable (i.e., no "death spiral"). Yale Law School professor Abbe R. Gluck, the director of the Solomon Center for Health Law and Policy, writes that Republican elected officials have taken a variety of steps to "sabotage" the ACA, creating uncertainty that has likely adversely impacted enrollment and insurer participation, and then insisting that the exchanges are in difficulty as an argument for repealing the ACA. The Washington Post columnist Dana Milbank has made the same argument. Health insurance writer Louise Norris states that Republicans sabotaged the ACA through:

- Lawsuits, both successful (Medicaid expansion limited) and unsuccessful (mandates and insurance subsidies upheld).
- Lawsuits pending, such as whether cost-sharing subsidies must be paid. President Trump is threatening not to pay these subsidies.
- Prevention of appropriations for transitional financing ("risk corridors") to steady insurance markets, resulting in the bankruptcy of many co-ops offering insurance.
- Weakening of the individual mandate through IRS-related executive orders to limit penalty collection.
- Reduction to funding for advertising for the 2017 exchange enrollment period.
- Ongoing insistence, despite CBO assertions to the contrary, that the exchanges are unstable or in a "death spiral".

=== Other impact ===
- Social Security expenditures would decrease due to earlier mortality: "CBO also estimates that outlays for Social Security benefits would decrease by about $3 billion over the 2017–2026 period."
- Medicaid expenditures would increase due to reduced access to birth control. "By CBO's estimates, in the one-year period in which federal funds for Planned Parenthood would be prohibited under the legislation, the number of births in the Medicaid program would increase by several thousand, increasing direct spending for Medicaid by $21 million in 2017 and by $77 million over the 2017–2026 period."
- Two reports from the Center for Budget and Policy Priorities concluded that the ACHA would have shifted $370 billion in Medicaid costs to the states, which would have then been forced to cut coverage and services, and would make health insurance far less affordable in high-cost states, particularly 11 states in which tax credit would have been more the halved.
- Every year one in 830 uninsured Americans die in a way which could have been prevented with better health care. A Congressional Budget Office report suggests an extra 16 million people would be left uninsured leading to 19,277 preventable deaths. Other uninsured people would develop painful chronic conditions or permanent disabilities which could have been prevented with health insurance.

=== Other provisions ===
The bills would allow states to continue to enroll persons in the ACA Medicaid expansion through January 1, 2020, and would disallow further enrollment after that date. The AHCA will include age-based tax credits for those who earn less than $75,000, or $150,000 for joint filers. The bill would have required insurance companies to cover pre-existing conditions. The AHCA used a standard of 'continuous coverage', defined by a 63-day coverage gap, where an individual who currently has insurance and is changing insurers will not pay a higher rate with their new insurer. Individuals who wished to buy insurance but were outside of the coverage gap would have paid a 30 percent premium surcharge for one year and then return to standard rates. Both healthy and the sick were required to pay the surcharge, which may have caused healthier persons to remain outside of the market, causing overall health care costs to rise (see adverse selection, high-risk pool).

=== Accuracy of CBO coverage forecasts ===
In general, CBO has been more accurate than other significant forecasting entities regarding the coverage impact of the ACA/Obamacare. It has been very accurate with respect to forecasting the number of uninsured and change in uninsured, but off significantly in forecasting the number of persons who would enroll in the exchanges. Instead, many more persons retained their employer-based plan than CBO had anticipated. CBO revises its forecasts for health insurance coverage due to current law (ACA/Obamacare) annually.

- CBO forecast in February 2010 that there would be 31 million fewer uninsured in 2017 due to ACA; the 2016 forecast for 2017 was 24 million (7 million or 23% difference). The Kaiser Family Foundation estimated in October 2015 that 3.1 million additional people were not covered because of 19 states that rejected the Medicaid expansion in the wake of a 2012 Supreme Court decision that preserved their existing Medicaid funding whether or not they expanded coverage. This 2012 event accounts for much of the difference; CBO reduced its Medicaid coverage expansion forecast for the year 2017 by 5 million between 2010 and 2013.
- CBO forecast in February 2013 that there would be 29 million uninsured in 2017; the 2017 forecast is 27 million (2 million or 7% difference).
- CBO forecast in February 2013 that there would be 11 million additional persons covered by Medicaid in 2017; the 2017 forecast is 12 million (1 million or 9% difference).
- CBO forecast in February 2013 that there would be 26 million additional persons covered under the exchanges in 2017; the 2017 forecast is 10 million (16 million or 62% difference). Regarding the inaccuracy of their exchange forecast, CBO explained that one of their assumptions was that more employers would choose to drop their coverage in favor of the exchanges than has actually occurred. CBO wrote in March 2017 that: "...most of the people who are no longer projected to obtain insurance through the marketplaces will instead be covered by employment-based insurance."

== History ==
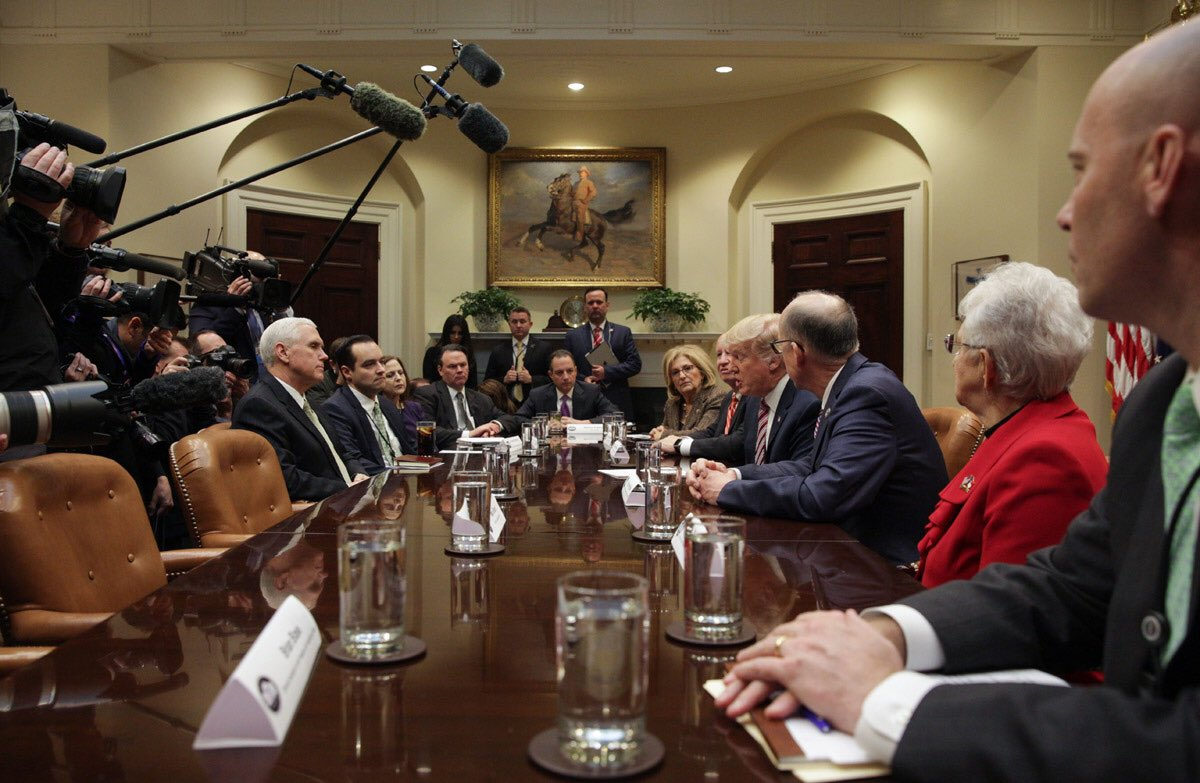
Trump discussing with lawmakers on replacing the ACA at the White House, March 2017

=== Initial version ===
The two bills that constituted the AHCA were introduced into the House Energy and Commerce Committee and the House Ways and Means Committee on March 8, 2017 and passed both committees the next day. Both committees approved the AHCA on a party-line vote without a CBO report, prompting criticism from Democrats. House Minority Leader Nancy Pelosi argued that the bill should not proceed through Congress until the CBO completed its analysis of the bill. Representative Richard Neal, the ranking Democratic member of the House Ways and Means Committee, stated: "To consider a bill of this magnitude without a CBO score is not only puzzling and concerning, but also irresponsible." Trump administration officials, including budget director Mick Mulvaney and economic adviser Gary Cohn, preemptively attacked the CBO, with Cohn saying that the CBO's score would be "meaningless". These criticisms from the White House are unusual: prior administrations of both parties had refrained from questioning the CBO's credibility, and many members of Congress respect the CBO as a neutral body.

The bill next went to the House Budget Committee, which passed it on March 16 by 19 to 17 votes, with three Republicans from the conservative Freedom Caucus joining Democrats in opposition. It next went to the Rules Committee, which sets the terms of the debate before a bill comes to the full House. A House vote was initially scheduled for March 23, but was delayed for at least a day after Republican leaders were unable to find enough votes for passage. On March 24, with both moderate and far-right Republican lawmakers opposing the bill, Speaker Paul Ryan and President Trump chose to withdraw the bill from consideration rather than go through with a full House vote that would have failed.

The comparatively "lightning fast" legislative movement for the AHCA through the House was in contrast to the Affordable Care Act, which took months of negotiations, committee markup, and debate before passage in 2010. The quick process prompted complaints from Democrats "that the Republicans were rushing to approve a repeal bill without hearing from consumers, health care providers, insurance companies or state officials – and without having estimates of the cost or the impact on coverage from the Congressional Budget Office".

In House committees, Democratic representatives offered more than 100 amendments to the legislation, including amendments that "would have required the law to guarantee no one would lose insurance, hospitals would not see an increase in uncompensated care, the deficit would not increase, taxes would not go up on people making less than $250,000, and that people over 55 years old would not lose benefits or pay higher out-of-pocket costs." Democratic Representative Joe Crowley of New York offered an amendment that during the 2010 Affordable Care Act debate had been proposed by Republican Representative Kevin Brady of Texas, requiring "that the bill be posted online for 72 hours before any votes were taken on it, and that every member put a statement in the Congressional Record stating he or she had read the bill." All of these Democratic amendments were rejected, as Brady (the chairman of the House Ways and Means Committee) ruled that the amendments were "not germane" to the bill, and the Republican majority repeatedly upheld these rulings.

==== Division among the House Republicans ====
In the days leading up to the vote, which was originally scheduled for March 23, 2017, there was increased division among House Republicans over the replacement, causing concerns among Republican Party leadership over having the votes needed to pass the bill. Among Republican defectors from the bill, the largest opposition came from members of the House Freedom Caucus, which consists of some of the most conservative members in the House. The Freedom Caucus members, among their primary objections to the bill, were not convinced that the healthcare replacement effectively abolished some elements of the Affordable Care Act, most prominently the essential health benefits. To achieve success in the House, Republicans could not afford more than twenty-one members of their own party voting against the bill, and several days before the vote, dissent within the party, largely from the Freedom Caucus, was a significant threat to its passage. Beyond the conservative members of the Freedom Caucus, there was continued opposition to the bill from more moderate Republicans in the House, such as from members of the center-right Tuesday Group, where there were concerns about loss of coverage and the potential of rising insurance costs.

Amid the division between the Republicans, the party leadership, which was led by House Speaker Paul Ryan, attempted to ease concerns among the Freedom Caucus and others. President Trump also held numerous meetings with Republicans in the House leading up to the vote, though after negotiations with the Freedom Caucus over the ACA's essential health benefits, there was still a considerable amount of opposition from moderates and members of the Freedom Caucus alike. On the day of the scheduled vote, which coincided with the seven-year anniversary of the ACA's signing into law, party leadership continued to struggle with getting the required votes for the bill, and the vote was rescheduled for the following day, March 24, 2017, as requested by the White House.

==== Withdrawal ahead of vote ====
The night before the rescheduled vote, Trump, in a final effort to negotiate with those opposing the bill, announced to the House Republicans that the vote the following day would be their only chance to repeal the Affordable Care Act, a goal long sought after by Republicans in Congress. The following morning the bill was brought to the House floor after being approved by the House Rules Committee for four hours of debate preceding the vote, which was expected in the afternoon. It was reported that a couple hours before the expected vote, Ryan made a sudden visit to the White House to meet with Trump, in which Ryan told Trump that the bill did not have enough votes to pass in the House. Shortly after the time of the expected vote it was announced that the Republicans were withdrawing the AHCA from consideration, a decision made after Ryan met with Trump. Following the withdrawal, Ryan stated in a press conference that the country is "going to be living with Obamacare for the foreseeable future", while Trump said that it was tough to pass the bill without support from Democrats; Ryan and Trump both said they were going to move forward on other policy issues.

=== Revised version ===
Through the various iterations of bill it has been nicknamed variously as Trumpcare, Ryancare, Republicare, and pejoratively as Obamacare-Lite, and Wealthcare.

Map of the House of Representatives' vote on H.R. 1628, the "American Health Care Act of 2017", on May 4, 2017 (sorted by whoever represents each congressional district): 217 Yes (Republican) 20 No (Republican) 1 Not voting (Republican) 4 Vacant 193 No (Democrat)

==== MacArthur Amendment ====
In April 2017, House Republicans tried to reconcile their divisions with the proposed MacArthur Amendment. The MacArthur Amendment, developed by Representative Tom MacArthur of the Tuesday Group (representing more moderate Republicans) and Representative Mark Meadows of the House Freedom Caucus (representing the hard-line right). The language of the proposed amendment became available on April 25, 2017. The amendment allows insurers to charge enrollees in their 50s and early 60s more than younger enrollees. It also allows states to waive essential health benefits and certain sections of the community rating program. As revised by the MacArthur Amendment, the ACHA weakens protections for patients with preexisting conditions; under this version of the bill, insurers would be able to charge people significantly more if they had a pre-existing condition.

==== Passage in House ====
On May 3, House Republicans announced that they had enough votes to pass the bill, after amending it to include an additional $8 billion over five years to subsidize insurance for people with pre-existing conditions. On May 4, 2017, the House of Representatives voted in favor of repealing the Patient Protection and Affordable Care Act and passing the American Health Care Act with a narrow vote of 217 to 213. Upon the bill's passing, congressional Republicans rushed to the White House for a televised celebration. 217 Republican Congressmen voted for the bill, while all 193 Democrats and 20 Republicans voted against it. Most of the Republicans who voted against the bill are members of the centrist Tuesday Group, and only one member of the Freedom Caucus voted against the bill.

=== Senate bills ===
The Senate developed several amendments / bills to modify the AHCA bill that had passed in the House, but none had received enough votes in the Senate to pass as of July 28, 2017. These included the:

- Better Care Reconciliation Act of 2017 (BCRA), which was defeated in a 43–57 vote on July 25, 2017.
- Obamacare Repeal Reconciliation Act of 2017 (ORRA), which would have essentially repealed Obamacare, and was defeated in a 45–55 vote.
- Health Care Freedom Act of 2017 (HCFA) or "skinny repeal", which would have repealed the individual mandate but not the Medicaid expansion, and was defeated in a 49–51 vote.

Under the various Senate bills, the CBO estimated that relative to current law, millions more would be without health insurance and the budget deficit would be reduced moderately (roughly 5% or less over a decade). The effect on insurance premiums would vary widely in the exchange marketplaces (the non-employer market created by Obamacare) depending on the specific legislation.

==== Better Care Reconciliation Act of 2017 (BCRA) ====
In the Senate, Majority Leader Mitch McConnell appointed a group of 13 Republican Senators to prepare an Obamacare repeal bill. Released on June 22, 2017, the bill was known as the Better Care Reconciliation Act of 2017. Democrats, independents, and other Republicans were excluded from the process of preparing the bill and were given no information until the bill was released. The bill's differences from the House bill reflected divergent opinions within the Republican caucus. The phase-out of the Medicaid expansion would be made more gradual, but funding for Medicaid as it stood before the ACA would be reduced. Eligibility for premium subsidies would be tightened for middle-class recipients, but some aid would be extended to enrollees below the poverty level in states that did not expand Medicaid.

The AHCA would have replaced the individual mandate with a provision that would allow an insurer to add a 30 percent surcharge to the premium if an individual goes without coverage for 63 days or more. The original draft of the BCRA would have repealed the ACA's individual mandate but it did not include the AHCA's continuous coverage provision. A few days after the draft's release, it was amended to provide that someone who went without coverage for 63 days or more would have to wait six months to obtain new coverage.

==== Obamacare Repeal Reconciliation Act of 2017 (ORRA) ====
The CBO evaluated the bill, concluding that relative to current law it would reduce the budget deficit by $473 billion over 10 years (roughly 5%), increase the number of uninsured by 17 million in 2018 and 27 million in 2020, and increase average premiums in the marketplaces (non-group/non-employer-based) by roughly 25% in 2018 and by 50% in 2020. Roughly half the U.S. population would live in areas with no insurers participating in the marketplaces.

==== Health Care Freedom Act of 2017 (HCFA) ====
On July 14, Senator John McCain had surgery to remove a blood clot. The next day, McConnell announced that the vote on proceeding to consider the bill would be deferred until McCain returned from his recuperation period. Senate Democrats urged the Republican leadership to "use this additional time to hold public hearings ... on the policies in the bill, especially the radically conservative Cruz/Lee proposal released to the public only five days ago." On July 17, Senators Mike Lee (R-UT) and Jerry Moran (R-KS) came out against the bill, joining Rand Paul and Susan Collins who already opposed it, making it impossible for Republicans alone to pass it through. It was later revealed that John McCain was diagnosed with brain cancer, which was discovered during his surgery.

On July 25, Senate Republicans released a significantly stripped-down version of the healthcare bill, containing only fundamental provisions of the repeal that all Republicans agreed on, designed to only pass the motion to proceed to floor debate, still allowing further amendments to be added on the floor before final passage. The motion to proceed on this version of the bill passed in a 51–50 vote, with a tie-breaking vote cast by Vice President Mike Pence; Senators Susan Collins and Lisa Murkowski diverged from their party and voted against the measure. Senator John McCain traveled to Washington for the vote, returning to Senate for the first time since his cancer diagnosis.

Sen. Mitch McConnell amendment called the Health Care Freedom Act; also Known as "Skinny Repeal"

CBO Score of the "Skinny Bill"

After several failed votes within 24 hours of the bill being passed to floor debate, including a repeal without replace bill, the Republican senate leadership attempted to pass the Health Care Freedom Act (HCFA), referred to as a "skinny repeal." The skinny repeal, which was still being drafted on July 27, only repeals some provisions of the ACA, among them the individual mandate, requiring that all Americans buy insurance or pay a tax penalty, and parts of the employer mandate, which requires employers with greater than 50 employees to pay for health care for their employees. The bill was brought to the floor vote and the vote reached the predicted 49–50, majority being in favor of keeping the ACA as is. A tie would have allowed Vice President Mike Pence to cast a final tie breaking vote. The final vote was to be McCain, who walked to the floor in near silence and held out his hand. In a very climactic moment, he gave a thumbs down and the bill was rejected 49–51, with two other Republican senators, Susan Collins and Lisa Murkowski, siding with all Democrats and Independents.

==== Graham-Cassidy ====
On September 13, 2017, Senators Graham, Cassidy, Heller, and Johnson released a draft amendment to the bill that "repeals the structure and architecture of Obamacare and replaces it with a block grant given annually to states". However, it was not voted upon due to lack of support. On October 12, 2017, due to this failure of Congress to pass a repeal, President Donald Trump issued Executive Order 13813, titled an Executive Order to Promote Healthcare Choice and Competition.

== Reaction ==
=== Initial version ===
President Trump endorsed the bill after its release, calling it "our wonderful new Healthcare Bill" on Twitter. Speaker of the House Paul Ryan referred to the bill as a "conservative wish list" that would provide for "monumental, exciting conservative reform". Conservative economist Douglas Holtz-Eakin described the AHCA as "a good start".

But conservative members of the Republican Party quickly raised skepticism about the proposed reform as they would prefer a complete repeal of the PPACA. The White House sent Mick Mulvaney, executive of the Office of Management and Budget, to convince members of the House Freedom Caucus to support the legislation. According to numerous reports, Mulvaney was unsuccessful. Shortly after the meeting caucus chairman Mark Meadows said, "No new position tonight. Our position is the same. We believe we need to do a clean repeal bill."

A number of conservative groups have also criticized the bill for not being enough of a repeal, calling it "Obamacare 2.0". The Koch brother-supported organizations Americans for Prosperity and Freedom Partners have indicated their intention to put together a multimillion-dollar fund in support of re-election campaigns for conservative lawmakers who take a stand against the bill.

The AARP released a statement opposing the bill. Stating, "On top of the hefty premium increase for consumers, big drug companies and other special interests get a sweetheart deal". The American Medical Association released a statement opposing the bill. America's Essential Hospitals, American Hospital Association, Association of American Medical Colleges, Catholic Health Association of the United States, Children's Hospital Association, Federation of American Hospitals, and National Association of Psychiatric Health Systems also stated their opposition in a joint letter. Conservative groups, including Heritage Action, the Cato Institute, Americans for Prosperity, FreedomWorks, and Tea Party Patriots all oppose the bill.

Progressive groups, including MoveOn.org, American Bridge, the Center for American Progress, and Our Revolution, were resolutely opposed to the bill, as expected. Economist and The New York Times columnist Paul Krugman stated that the bill's "awfulness is almost surreal", writing that what Republican congressional leadership "came up with instead was a dog's breakfast that conservatives are, with some justice, calling Obamacare 2.0. But a better designation would be Obamacare 0.5, because it's a half-baked plan that accepts the logic and broad outline of the Affordable Care Act while catastrophically weakening key provisions." On March 23, 2017 (the seventh anniversary of ACA and one day prior to the vote on the American Health Care Act), former President Obama hailed the successes of the Affordable Care Act, including 20 million more Americans insured, preexisting conditions covered, young people staying on their parents' plans until 26, lowered costs for women's health care and free preventive care.

=== Later versions ===
President Trump celebrating the House passage of the American Health Care Act with Vice President Mike Pence and a number of key Republicans in the White House Rose Garden

After the House passed the AHCA, but before any legislation passed the Senate, Republican congressmen gathered with Trump to celebrate in the Rose Garden. In his speech, Trump described the bill as "very incredibly well-crafted." Republican Senators expressed less enthusiasm about the bill and opted to draft their own bill instead of taking up the House's version. Congressional Democrats and interest groups, such as the AARP, American Medical Association, ACLU, and Planned Parenthood, expressed their opposition to the bill.

At a lunch with Senate Republicans in June 2017, Trump reportedly called the AHCA "mean, mean, mean" and a "son of a bitch". He reportedly implored the Senators to make their version of the bill "more generous, more kind." Later that month, Trump confirmed that he had used the term "mean" to describe the bill.

On June 16, 2017, a bipartisan group of seven current Governors sent a letter to Senate Majority and Minority Leaders Mitch McConnell and Chuck Schumer criticizing the House's legislation and requesting a bipartisan effort in the Senate to reform healthcare. The signatories include Governors John Kasich (Ohio), Steve Bullock (Montana), Brian Sandoval (Nevada), John Bel Edwards (Louisiana), John Hickenlooper (Colorado), Charlie Baker (Massachusetts), and Tom Wolf (Pennsylvania).

When the Senate bill text (BCRA) was released, four conservative Republican Senators – Ted Cruz, Ron Johnson, Mike Lee, and Rand Paul – released a joint statement saying that they would not vote for the bill in that form. This was seen as an attempt to move the bill to the right by bringing pressure on McConnell. The next day, Senator Dean Heller of Nevada announced his opposition. He emphasized the effect on Medicaid, noting that the bill's cuts to Medicaid would "pull the rug" out from under many Nevada residents.

== Public opinion ==
An analysis of national polls by MIT political scientist Christopher Warshaw and Stanford political economist David Broockman showed that the AHCA "is the most unpopular piece of major legislation Congress has considered in decades" more so than Troubled Asset Relief Program legislation ("the bank bailout") and much more unpopular than the ACA. Their estimates of survey results indicate that there is not majority support for the bill in any state.

Public opinion polls show high levels of public opposition to the Republican health-care proposals (the AHCA in the House and the BCRA in the Senate). Approval ratings vary between 12 and 38%, and disapproval ratings between 41% and 62%, measured between March and June 2017 (refer to "Specific poll results" table below for sources). Views were split along party lines. For example, the monthly Kaiser Family Foundation health tracking poll for May 2017 indicated that:

- More view the Republican AHCA unfavorably (55%) than favorably (31%).
- Views are split along party lines, with % in favor of AHCA: Democrats 8%, Independents 30%, Republicans 67%.
- Although historically more people viewed the current law (ACA/"Obamacare") unfavorably than favorably, in May 2017 more had a favorable view (49%) than unfavorable (42%).
- More favorably view the ACA/Obamacare (49%) than the Republican AHCA (31%).

=== Specific poll results ===
The following are the results of polls of public opinion regarding the AHCA.

Poll source	Fieldwork		Support/Approve	Oppose/Disapprove
Poll source	Start	End	Support/Approve	Oppose/Disapprove
CBS News	September 21	September 24	20%	52%
Public Policy Polling	September 20	September 21	24%	50%
Public Policy Polling	August 18	August 21	25%	57%
The Economist/YouGov	July 31	August 1	23%	53%
Quinnipiac University	July 27	August 1	25%	64%
CBS News/YouGov	July 26	July 28	11%	41%
Fox News	July 16	July 18	25%	55%
The Economist/YouGov	July 15	July 18	28%	48%
Public Policy Polling	July 14	July 17	20%	57%
Associated Press-NORC	July 13	July 17	22%	51%
Monmouth University	July 13	July 16	27%	56%
HuffPost/YouGov	July 12	July 14	18%	44%
HuffPost/YouGov	July 12	July 14	16%	45%
Morning Consult/Politico	July 7	July 9	40%	47%
Kaiser Family Foundation	July 5	July 10	28%	61%
The Economist/YouGov	June 25	June 27	28%	48%
Fox News	June 25	June 27	27%	54%
USA Today/Suffolk University	June 24	June 27	12%	45%
Investor's Business Daily/TIPP	June 23	June 29	33%	62%
Quinnipiac University	June 22	June 27	16%	58%
Morning Consult/Politico	June 22	June 24	38%	45%
NPR/PBS NewsHour/Marist	June 21	June 25	17%	55%
The Economist/YouGov	June 18	June 20	28%	45%
NBC News/Wall Street Journal	June 17	June 20	16%	48%
Morning Consult/Politico	June 15	June 19	35%	50%
CBS News	June 15	June 18	32%	59%
Kaiser Family Foundation	June 14	June 19	30%	55%
HuffPost/YouGov	June 13	June 13	24%	45%
Reuters/Ipsos	June 9	June 13	30%	41%
Public Policy Polling	June 9	June 11	24%	55%
The Economist/YouGov	June 4	June 6	29%	47%
Quinnipiac University	May 31	June 6	17%	62%
The Economist/YouGov	May 27	May 30	28%	48%
Quinnipiac University	May 17	May 23	20%	57%
Kaiser Family Foundation	May 16	May 22	31%	55%
The Economist/YouGov	May 13	May 16	31%	47%
Public Policy Polling	May 12	May 14	25%	52%
NBC News/Wall Street Journal	May 11	May 13	23%	48%
The Economist/YouGov	May 6	May 9	31%	47%
HuffPost/YouGov	May 6	May 6	31%	44%
Quinnipiac University	May 4	May 9	21%	56%
Morning Consult/Politico	May 4	May 6	38%	42%
HuffPost/YouGov	March 25	March 25	22%	52%
The Economist/YouGov	March 19	March 21	31%	45%
Quinnipiac University	March 16	March 21	17%	56%
Morning Consult/Politico	March 16	March 19	40%	37%
HuffPost/YouGov	March 16	March 17	24%	45%
CBS News/YouGov	March 15	March 17	12%	41%
Fox News	March 12	March 14	34%	54%
SurveyMonkey	March 10	March 13	42%	55%
Public Policy Polling	March 10	March 12	24%	49%
Morning Consult/Politico	March 9	March 13	46%	35%

=== 2018 elections ===
The Niskanen Center stated that the GOP's support for AHCA in 2017 was a major factor in the party's heavy House losses in the 2018 midterm elections, costing the party its majority in the House, and Snopes publicly identified 33 House Republicans who were voted out of office largely due to their votes in favor of the AHCA, including in states where Republicans control most House seats, such as Kansas and Utah.

== Comparison between versions ==
This table describes major differences and similarities between the ACA, the AHCA as considered in the House in March 2017, the AHCA as passed by the House on May 4, 2017, and the BCRA. The Kaiser Family Foundation has also summarized the differences in a comprehensive table.

Differences and similarities between the ACA, AHCA, BCRA, and the HCFA
	ACA	AHCA (March 2017)	AHCA (May 2017)	BCRA (June 2017)	BCRA (July 2017)	HCFA (July 2017)
Insurance mandates	Individual mandate and an income tax penalty for not having insurance Employer mandate on larger companies	No individual or employer mandate Insurers can impose a one-year 30% surcharge on consumers with a lapse in coverage of more than 63 days		No individual or employer mandate An individual with a lapse in coverage of more than 63 days can be required to wait six months before obtaining new coverage	No individual mandate but incentives and subsidies for those who keep coverage Employer mandate on larger companies but smaller companies who optionally comply will get little to no small business taxes	No individual or employer mandate, but employers must still report
Aid for premiums	Income-based subsidies for premiums that limit after-subsidy cost to a percent of income	Age-based refundable tax credits for premiums, phased out for higher incomes		Income based refundable tax credits for premiums that limit after-subsidy cost to a percent of income	Income based subsidies for premiums that limit after-subsidy cost to a percent of income	
Aid for out-of-pocket expenses	Tax credits for out-of-pocket expenses	No tax credits for out-of-pocket expenses		No tax credits for out-of-pocket expenses after 2019	Tax credits for out-of-pocket expenses	
Medicaid	Matching federal funds to states for anyone who qualifies Expanded eligibility to 138% of poverty level income	Federal funds granted to states based on a capped, per-capita basis starting in 2020; States can choose to expand Medicaid eligibility, but would receive less federal support for those additional persons Lets state impose work requirements on Medicaid recipients		Federal funds granted to states based on a capped, per-capita basis or block grant starting in 2021; Federal government would pay smaller portion of cost in 2021	Matching federal funds to states for anyone who qualifies Expanded eligibility to 138% of poverty level income with continuous funding and incentives to expand coverage by state	No changes
Premium age differences	Insurers can charge older customers up to three times as much as younger customers	Insurers can charge older customers up to five times as much as younger customers	Insurers can charge older customers up to five times as much as younger customers; states can apply for waivers exempting insurers from this limit	Insurers can charge older customers up to five times as much as younger customers; states can change this ratio	Insurers can charge older customers up to four times as much as younger customers; states can apply for waivers to reduce ratio	
Health Savings Accounts	Individuals can put $3,400 and families can put $6,750 into a tax-free health savings account	Individuals can put $6,550 and families can put $13,100 into a tax-free health savings account		Individuals can put up to the maximum allowed for out-of-pocket costs and spouses can make additional contributions	Individuals with incomes below $100,000 a year can save up to $7000 for individuals and $14000 for families in a tax-free health savings account; incomes above that limit will be subject to taxes on a sliding scale	Individuals can put $6,550 and families can put $13,100 in HSA-eligible high-deductible health plans for three years, 2018 to 2020
"Cadillac" tax	Cadillac tax on high-cost employer plans implemented in 2020	Cadillac tax on high-cost employer plans implemented in 2025	Cadillac tax on high-cost employer plans implemented in 2026		Cadillac tax on high-cost employer plans implemented in 2023	
Other taxes	3.8% tax on investment income 0.9% tax on individuals with an income higher than $200,000 or families with an income higher than $250,000 Fee on health insurance providers firms based on plans 2.3% tax on medical devices	Repeal of all four taxes			3% tax on investment income for companies that don't buy or hire American; 0.7% tax on individuals and families with incomes higher than $275,000	Moratorium on the medical device tax extended from December 31, 2017 to December 31, 2020
Essential health benefits	Insurers are required to offer ten essential health benefits	Private plans are required to offer the ten essential health benefits. Some Medicaid plans are not required to offer mental health and substance abuse benefits	States can apply for waivers exempting insurers from the essential health benefits requirement	States could determine what qualifies as an essential health benefit Sunset of essential health benefits on December 31, 2019	Insurers are required to offer ten essential health benefits	
Pre-existing conditions	Insurers are banned from denying coverage or charging more for pre-existing conditions		Each state can allow insurers to increase premiums based on pre-existing conditions after a lapse in coverage, if the state sets up a high-risk pool	Insurers are banned from denying coverage or charging more for pre-existing conditions	Insurers are banned from denying coverage or charging more for pre-existing conditions but will receive funding for unexpected losses due to this requirement	
Dependents staying on plan	Dependents can stay on health insurance plan until age 26					
Annual and lifetime limits	Insurers are prohibited from setting annual and lifetime limits on individual coverage		Insurers may be able to place annual and lifetime limits on individual coverage		Insurers are prohibited for setting annual or lifetime limits on individual coverage	
Treatment of Planned Parenthood and similar organizations	No provisions	Federal payments blocked for one year			No provisions	Federal payments blocked for one year

== See also ==
- 2017 Patient Protection and Affordable Care Act replacement proposals
- World's Greatest Healthcare Plan of 2017
