= Economy of the Netherlands =

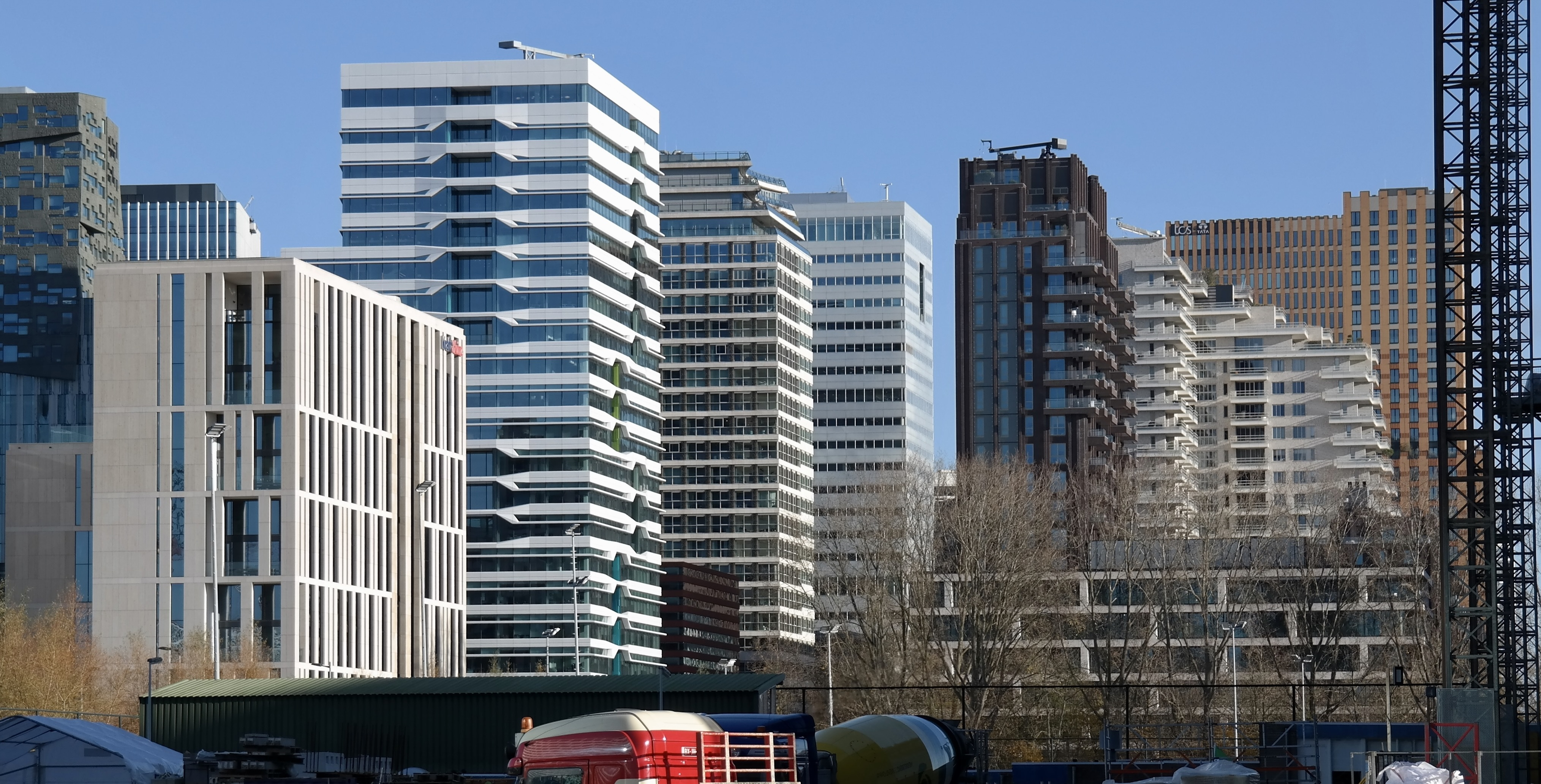
- Zuidas in Amsterdam
- Currency: Euro (EUR, €)
- Fiscal year: Calendar year
- Trade organisations: EU, WTO and OECD
- Country group: Advanced economy; High-income economy; Welfare state

Statistics
- Population: ▲18,130,200 (15 December 2025)
- GDP: ▲$1.413 trillion (nominal; 2026f); ▲$1.581 trillion (PPP; 2026f)
- GDP rank: 18th (nominal; 2025); 28th (PPP; 2025)
- GDP growth: 1.7% (2025f); 1.3% (2026f)
- GDP per capita: ▲$77,881 (nominal; 2026f); ▲$87,173 (PPP; 2026f)
- GDP per capita rank: 10th (nominal; 2025); 10th (PPP; 2025)
- GDP per capita growth: 1.3% (2025)
- GDP by sector: Agriculture: 1.6%; Industry: 17.9%; Services: 80.2%; (2017 est.)
- Inflation (CPI): 4.1% (2023); 3.2% (2024f); 2.3% (2025f); 2.0% (2026f)
- Population below national poverty line: 5% (2017 est.); 17.0% at risk of poverty or social exclusion (AROPE 2023)
- Gini coefficient: 26.4 low (2023)
- Human Development Index: 0.946 very high (2022) (10th); 0.885 very high IHDI (2022, 7th)
- Corruption Perceptions Index: 79 out of 100 points (2023) (8th)
- Labour force: 9,181,373 (2019); 83.5% employment rate (2023)
- Labour force by occupation: Agriculture: 1.2%; Industry: 17.2%; Services: 81.6%; (2017)
- Unemployment: 4% (October 2025); 8.8% youth unemployment (October 2025; 15 to 24 year-olds)
- Average gross salary: €5,190 monthly
- Average net salary: €3,771 monthly
- Main industries: Agriculture, oil and natural gas, metal and engineering products, electronic machinery and equipment, chemicals, petroleum, construction, microelectronics, fishing

External
- Exports: $610 billion (2023)
- Export goods: Refined petroleum, broadcasting equipment, machinery, packaged medicine, crude petroleum (2023)
- Main export partners: Germany 17.1%; Belgium 14.2%; France 10.7%; Italy 6.2%; United Kingdom 4.8%; United States 4.3%; (2023)
- Imports: $710 billion (2023)
- Import goods: Crude petroleum, refined petroleum, natural gas, broadcasting equipment, computers (2023)
- Main import partners: Germany 15.6%; United States 10.1%; China 9.9%; Belgium 9.1%; United Kingdom 5.1%; France 3.4%; (2023)
- FDI stock: $5.499 trillion (2017); Abroad: $6.579 trillion (2017)
- Current account: $90.207 billion (2019)
- Gross external debt: $4.345 trillion (2019)

Public finance
- Government debt: 44.4% of GDP (2025); €524 billion (2025)
- Foreign reserves: $54.016 billion (2021) (41st)
- Budget balance: €14.0 billion surplus (2019); +1.7% of GDP (2019)
- Revenue: 43.6% of GDP (2019)
- Spending: 41.9% of GDP (2019)
- Economic aid: €1.9 billion from European Structural and Investment Funds (2007–2013); €1.72 billion from European Structural and Investment Funds (2014–2020)
- Credit rating: Standard & Poor's: AAA (Domestic); AAA (Foreign); AAA (T&C Assessment); Outlook: Stable; Moody's: Aaa; Outlook: Stable; Fitch: AAA; Outlook: Stable; Scope: AAA; Outlook: Stable
- All values, unless otherwise stated, are in US dollars.

The Netherlands has a highly developed social market economy focused on trade and logistics, manufacturing, services, innovation and technology and sustainable and renewable energy. It is the world's 18th largest economy by nominal GDP and the 28th largest by purchasing power parity (PPP) and is the fifth largest economy in the European Union by nominal GDP. It has the world's 11th highest nominal per capita GDP and the 13th highest PPP-adjusted per capita GDP as of 2023, making it one of the highest earning nations in the world. Many of the world's largest tech companies are based in its capital Amsterdam or have established their European headquarters in the city, such as IBM, Microsoft, Google, Oracle, Cisco, Uber and Netflix. Its second largest city Rotterdam is a major trade, logistics and economic center of the world and is Europe's largest seaport. Netherlands is ranked seventh on the Global Innovation Index in 2026 and fourth on the WEF Global Competitiveness Report. Among OECD nations, Netherlands has a highly efficient and strong social security system; social expenditure stood at roughly 25.3% of GDP.

The Netherlands has a prosperous and open economy, which depends heavily on foreign trade. The economy is noted for stable industrial relations, fairly low unemployment and inflation, a sizable current account surplus (which, compared to the size of the country, is even more than Germany) and an important role as a European transportation hub; Rotterdam is the biggest port in Europe; and Amsterdam has one of the biggest airports in the world. Industrial activity is predominantly in food processing, chemicals, petroleum refining, high-tech, financial services, the creative sector and electrical machinery. Its highly mechanized agricultural sector employs no more than 2% of the labor force but provides large surpluses for the food-processing industry and for exports. The Netherlands, along with 11 of its EU partners, began circulating the euro currency on 1 January 2002.

The Netherlands has had steady natural gas resources since 1959, when a wellspring was discovered. Currently the Netherlands accounts for more than 25% of all natural gas reserves in the European Union. Over the following decades, the sale of natural gas generated a significant rise in revenue for the Netherlands. However, the unforeseen consequences of the country's energy wealth originally impacted the competitiveness of other sectors of the economy, leading to the theory of Dutch disease, after the discovery of the vast Groningen gas field.

The Netherlands is a "conduit country" that helps to funnel profits from high-tax countries to tax havens. It has been ranked as the 7th largest tax haven in the world.

The stern financial was abandoned in 2009, because of the then-current credit crises. The relatively large banking sector was partly nationalized and bailed out through government interventions. The unemployment rate dropped to 5.0% in the summer of 2011, but increased with a sharp rate to 7.3% in May 2013, and 6.8% in 2015. It dropped again to 3.9% in March 2018. The state budget deficit was about 2.2% in 2015, well below the norm of 3.0% in the EU. In 2016, the state budget showed a surplus of 0.4%. It was expected to grow to a surplus of over 1.0% in 2017. The Dutch invented and introduced the stock market, which initially focused on merchandise trading through the Dutch East India Company. The Netherlands is a founding member of the European Union, the OECD and the World Trade Organization.

== History ==
After declaring its independence from the empire of Philip II of Spain in 1581, the Netherlands experienced almost a century of explosive economic growth. A technological revolution in capital, due to Protestant traders of Flanders who fled to the Netherlands, helped the young Republic become the dominant trade power by the mid-17th century. In 1670 the Dutch merchant marine totalled 568,000 tons of shipping—about half the European total. The main reasons for this were the dominance of the Amsterdam Entrepôt in European trade, and that of the Dutch East India Company (or Verenigde Oost-Indische Companie – VOC) and West India Companies in intercontinental trade. These companies were based on the English model and the success of England's joint-stock enterprises and trading guilds.

Beside trade, an early "industrial revolution" (powered by wind, water and peat), land reclamation from the sea, and agricultural revolution, helped the Dutch economy achieve the highest standard of living in Europe (and presumably the world) by the middle of the 17th century. Affluence facilitated what is known as the Dutch Golden Age. This economic boom abruptly came to an end by a combination of political-military upheavals and adverse economic developments around 1670. Still the Netherlands kept a high level of prosperity, due to trade and agriculture.

Towards the 1800s, the Netherlands did not industrialize as rapidly as some other countries in Europe. One explanation for this is that the Netherlands were struggling to come to terms with having lost their dominant economical (based mainly on trade and agriculture) and political position in the world. Griffiths argues that government policies made possible a unified Dutch national economy in the 19th century. They included the abolition of internal tariffs and guilds; a unified coinage system; modern methods of tax collection; standardized weights and measures; and the building of many roads, canals, and railroads.

The rest of Europe in the 19th century saw the gradual transformation of the Netherlands into a modern middle-class industrial society. The number of people employed in agriculture decreased while the country made an effort to revive its stake in the highly competitive industrial and trade business. The Netherlands lagged behind Belgium until the late 19th century in industrialization, then caught up by about 1920. Major industries included textiles and (later) the great Philips industrial conglomerate. Rotterdam became a major shipping and manufacturing center. Poverty slowly declined and begging largely disappeared along with steadily improving working conditions for the population.

It wasn’t until the early 1930's when more interventionist economic policies were heavily considered by the Dutch. The great depression in 1930 raised doubts about the fairness of a pure market system, and its inability to correct the economy on its own. In 1940, Nazi Germany successfully invaded the Netherlands in just 5 days, followed by 5 years of occupation. In the later years of the war (1942–45), the Germans faced significant financial struggles and began to exploit the Dutch economy as much as they could. Two years later, in 1947, the Dutch economy had fully recovered. This was the fastest post-war recovery of any other Western European country. The following period from 1950-1973 is known as the second Golden Age of the Dutch economy.

This second Golden Age was fueled by high cooperation between firms, employers, unions, and the government. The government also adopted more hands-on economic regulations such as the guided wage policy, restrictions on shareholder control, and the expansion of welfare state programs.

In 1959, the Netherlands discovered large natural gas fields. The export of natural gas led to large windfall profits. However, as an unforeseen consequence, these were believed to have led to a decline in the manufacturing sector in the Netherlands.

== Government and economic policy ==
While the private sector is the cornerstone of the Dutch economy, governments at different levels have a large part to play. Public spending, excluding social security transfer payments, was at 28% of GDP in 2011. Total tax revenue was 38.7% of GDP in 2010, which was below the EU average. In addition to its own spending, the government plays a significant role through the permit requirements and regulations pertaining to almost every aspect of economic activity. The government combines a rigorous and stable microeconomic policy with wide-ranging structural and regulatory reforms. The government has gradually reduced its role in the economy since the 1980s. Privatization and deregulation is still continuing. With regards to social and economic policy, the government cooperates with its so called social partners (trade unions and employers' organizations). The three parties come together in the Social-Economic Council (‘Sociaal Economische Raad’), the main platform for social dialogue.

=== Home mortgage interest deduction ===
The Netherlands was one of the few countries in the world where the interest paid on mortgages is almost fully deductible from income tax. Since 2013 big changes were made. The conditions allowing a borrowing of more than 116% of the value of the home were reduced to 106% and are still continuously being reduced every year. The deduction is also capped to 50.5% and reducing every year. Together with the after-effects of the Great Recession the result was a housing crisis, with a decrease of prices almost 25% percent in some areas. Recent years have shown a recovery of 10% to even 20% per year in the most popular cities.

== Social security system ==
The Dutch social security is very comprehensive and multi-faceted, and is divided into the national security (Volksverzekering) and the employee insurance (Werknemersverzekering). Whereas the first covers all living in the Netherlands and the social benefits provided, the latter provides employment-related benefits. All living in the Netherlands are required to pay into the social security system, including residents from outside the Netherlands, with a few exceptions.

The Volksverzekering is compulsory for all and covers the residents under different forms of national insurance:

- Long-term care under the Long-Term Care Act (Wet Langdurige Zorg (WLZ)) (formerly known as The Exceptional Medical Expenses Act (Algemen Wet Bijzondere Ziektekosten (AWBZ)))
- Pension care under the General Old Age Pensions Act (Algemene Ouderdomswet (AOW))
- Survivor benefits under the General Surviving Relatives Act (Algemene nabestaandenwet( ANW)) (formerly known as The General Widow's and Orphans’ Act (Algemene Weduwen-en Wezenwet (AWW)))
- Child benefits under the General Family Allowances Act (Algemene Kinderbijslagwet (AKW))

It is overseen by the Social Insurance Bank (Sociale Verzekeringsbank (SVB)) and financed through earning-related contributions of employers and employees up until a maximum income-ceiling. Whilst employed persons get their contribution deducted automatically from their wage, the unemployed pay by themselves. The AKW is financed by employers, whereas the AOW is financed by the employees. The AOW, additionally, is financed by a small government subsidy.

The Werknemersverzekering is compulsory for all employed people within the Netherlands. It includes the coverage of employees in the following areas:

- Unemployment benefits under the Unemployment Insurance Act (Werkloosheidswet (WW))
- Sick leave under the Sickness Benefits Act (Ziektewet (ZW))
- Disability benefits under the Disablement Insurance Act (Wet werk en inkomen naar arbeidsvermogen (WIA))

The financing for the Werknemersverzekering is automatically deducted from the employee's income by the employer.

=== Unemployment benefits ===
==== Coverage ====
The unemployment benefits in the Netherlands, as set out under the WW, covers almost all employees, that are employees based on a working-contract. Excluded from the WW are the following: self-employed, nationally employed, persons working less than four days a week, heads of stockholders and voluntary workers that earn up to €150 per year.

==== Right to benefits ====
To profit from the benefit the unemployed has to submit an application to the Employee Insurance Agency (Uitvoeringsinstituut Werknemersverzekeringen (UWV)) within one week of becoming unemployed and additionally has to register as job-seeker. The WW only covers employees with a sufficient work history, meaning that an applicant has to have been working for at least 26 weeks in the past 36 weeks before becoming unemployed. If so, the working-weeks requirement is met. Moreover, the employee is only eligible to unemployment benefits if the unemployment has not been due to his own fault (e.g. own termination of the job contract).

==== Benefits ====
The benefits received through the WW are earnings-related and amount to 75% of the previous daily earnings (based on 5 working days per week) for the duration of two months. After those two months the benefits reduce to 70%. Part-time work is taken into account with a calculation of parts of the working hours. If this benefit is less than the minimum income, the benefit can be supplemented under the Additional Allowances Act (Toeslagenwet). If there has been a change of employment, all jobs in the previous twelve months are included in the calculation of the benefits. To continue to receive benefits, the individual needs to be actively looking for work. Moreover, one needs to participate in e-coaching three and twelve months after the start of unemployment. After one year of unemployment one must register with an employment agency.

=== Pensions ===
Under the AOW (General Old Age Pensions Act) of 1956, every Dutch citizen was entitled to a state pension from the age of 65. However the act was amended in 2012 to increase the pension age in several stages up to 67 in 2024. Married couples and those who live together receive 50% of minimum wage per person, and a single person receives 70% of minimum wage. Most (about 70%) earn an extra pension from private pension funds. Employees are obliged to participate in the sector pension funds. The total amount of pension funds at the end of 2009 was some 664 billion euro and by the end of 2019 this had increased to 1560 billion euro, for a population of just over 17 million. Employees receive on average about 70% of their final salary. During the economic crisis and because of low interest rates, pension funds have had difficulty keeping up with inflation.

== Labour market ==
The labour productivity level of the Netherlands is one of highest in Europe. OECD, 2012

Part-time employment rate (%) in OECD countries. The Netherlands has the highest rate.

The Dutch labour market has relatively strict regulations for employers on firing employees, although by June 2014 the House of Representatives has agreed to loosen these regulations. Due to the costs of employees and costs of firing them, a large part of the working force (about 15% of the working force) is an independent one person company (ZZP). They are independent and get paid by delivery without higher social costs. Another big part of the workforce is hired as temporary workforce. State unemployment benefits in the form of a 70% benefit of the employee's last-earned salary for up to three years (with a maximum of roughly 2500 euros per month) are available for fired employees, provided that they have worked for a certain minimum time period, usually 26 weeks. Moreover, the self-employed individuals (zelfstandigen zonder personeel (ZZP)) are not automatically covered under the Werknemersverzekeringen, and are not obligated to enroll into unemployment, sickness or disabilities insurance. Self-employed individuals are therefore required to enroll themselves with private insurance companies. The Dutch Government is however, working hard to combat bogus self-employment by applying significant changes and tightening of rules under Wet Deregulering Beoordeling Arbeidsrelaties (DBA).

== Inequality and redistribution ==
With a Gini coefficient of 25.1 (2013) the income inequality is relatively low in the Netherlands. However, the inequality when measured in distributions of household wealth is high, where the top 1% owns 24% of all net wealth, and the top 10% own 60%. Moreover, rather large wealth disparities persist in the Netherlands in relation to age, where those under 35 years-of-age own 10% as much as older workers. This is a consequence from the low taxation of home ownership and a generous mortgage interest deductibility, which benefit the wealthier households. Due to the generous pensions the pension-related savings are the most important part of wealth in the Netherlands, yet are not subject to capital income taxation, which increases the inequality. The taxation comes as income tax when the saved pension is paid out. People having earned minimum wages only, will not build up any pension. The idea behind a pension is to have a net income after retirement that is comparable to before retirement. The AOW, the Dutch retirement law, guarantees an income up to 70% of minimum wage per person. Therefore, only people earning more than minimum wage need to save to ensure comparable income after retirement.

== Sectors ==
The Service sector accounts for more than half of the national income, primarily in transportation, distribution and logistics, financial areas, software development and the creative industry. The breadth of service providers in financial services has contributed to the Netherlands achieving a DAW Index score of 5 in 2012. Industrial activity is dominated by the machinery, electronics/high tech industry, metalworking, oil refining, chemical, and food-processing industries. Construction amounts to about 6% of GDP. Agriculture and fishing, although visible and traditional Dutch activities, account for just 2%.

=== Agriculture ===
In 2018, in addition to smaller productions of other agricultural products, the Netherlands produced:

- 1.2 million tons of onion;
- 14 million tons of cow milk;
- 247 thousand tons of barley;
- 269 thousand tons of apple;
- 295 thousand tons of lettuce;
- 300 thousand tons of mushroom and truffle;
- 355 thousand tons of bell pepper;
- 402 thousand tons of pear;
- 410 thousand tons of cucumber;
- 538 thousand tons of carrot;
- 6.0 million tonnes of potatoes (10th largest producer in the world);
- 6.5 million tons of sugar beet, which is used to produce sugar and ethanol;
- 910 thousand tons of tomato;
- 961 thousand tons of wheat.

=== Energy sector ===
==== Natural gas ====
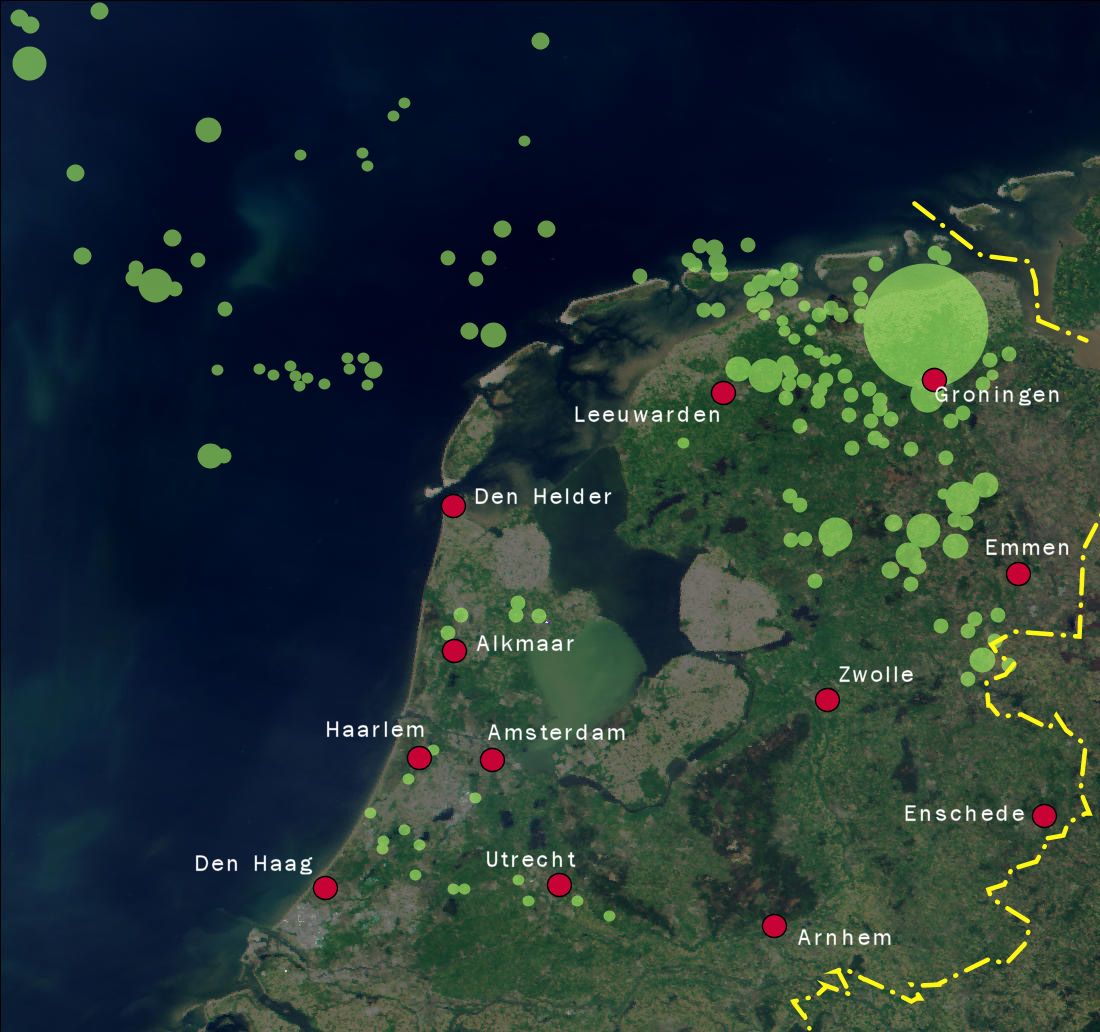
Natural gas concessions in the Netherlands. Today the Netherlands accounts for more than 25% of all Natural Gas reserves in the EU.

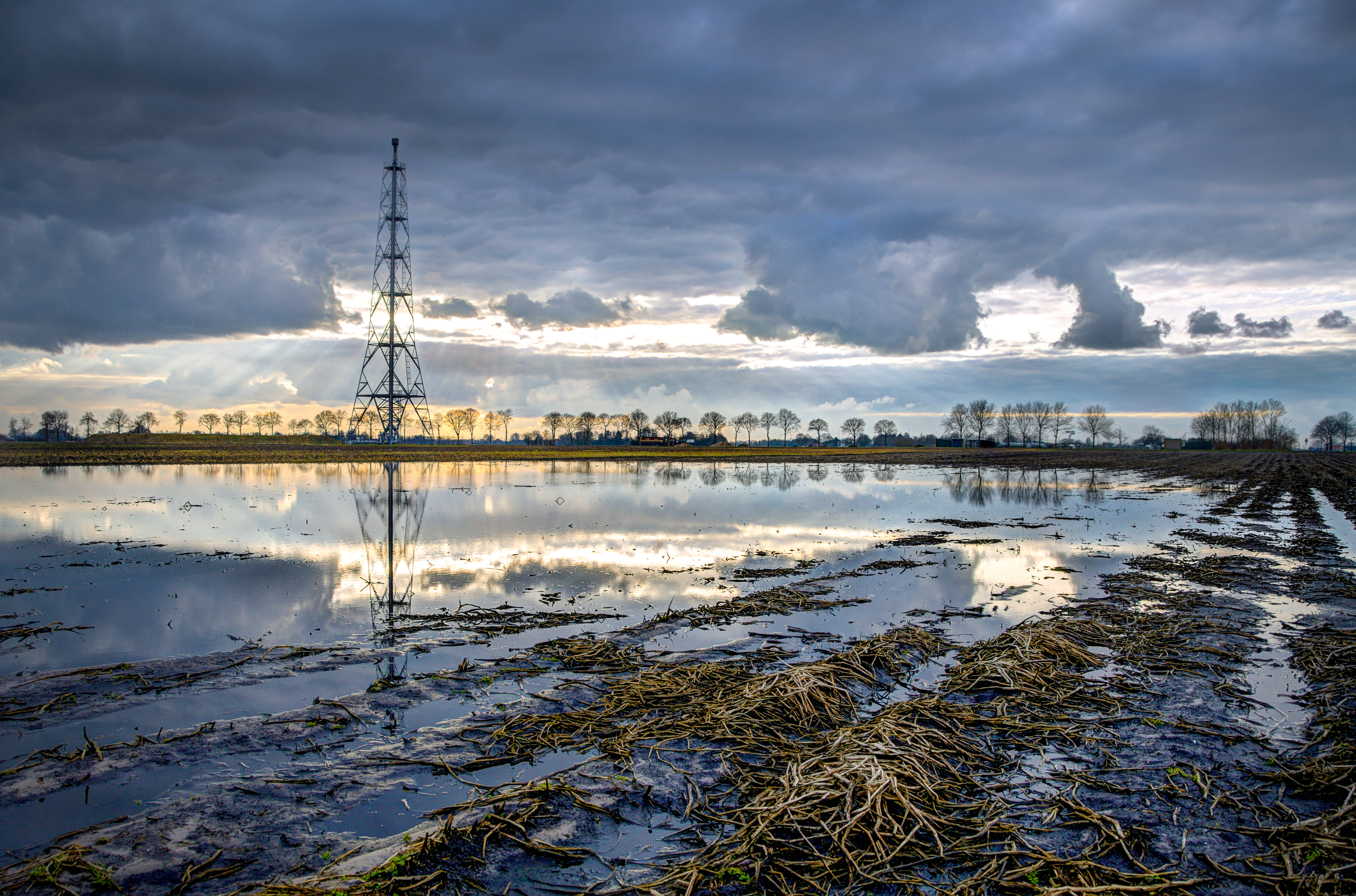
Station Wildervank of the Groningen natural gas field, which transformed the Netherlands economy after its discovery in 1959, leading to the theory of Dutch disease

The discovery of the large Groningen natural gas field in 1959 and the massive windfalls accrued over subsequent decades, were believed to have led to a decline in the manufacturing sector in the Netherlands, leading to the theory of Dutch disease.

While its oil reserves in the North Sea are of little importance, the Netherlands have an estimated 25% of natural gas reserves in the EU. Natural gas reserves of the Netherlands are estimated (as of 2014) to be about 600 billion cubic feet, or about 0.3% of the world total. In 2014–2015 the government decided to reduce the production of gas in the province Groningen significantly due to problems of sinking ground, differential settlement levels and tremors (small earth quakes) causing damages to properties, end 2018 the government decided to completely abandon the gas production in the province of Groningen by reducing the production slightly each year, the production was expected to come to a halt entirely by 2028. On June 23, 2023, the government decided to close the remaining five production facilities as of October 1, 2023. The possibility of reopening one or more facilities is being kept open, citing the uncertain international situation and possibly very cold weather as possible reasons for this. All wells will be permanently closed and dismantled as of October 1, 2024.

To reduce its greenhouse emissions, the government of the Netherlands is subsidizing a transition away from natural gas for all homes in the country by 2050. In the Netherlands, 98% of enterprises are reducing greenhouse gas emissions, beating the EU average of 89%. However, only 48% of Dutch firms set and monitor their own emission targets. Dutch enterprises mostly cut emissions through waste reduction or recycling (86%), as well as energy efficiency programmes (76%).

In the Netherlands, 78% of enterprises have invested in reducing carbon emissions and mitigating the impact of weather disasters as of 2023. Six out of ten (60%) plan to invest in these areas during the next three years. The numbers for 'already invested' and 'intend to invest' above the EU average (56% and 54%, respectively). The largest invested is in trash reduction or recycling (86% of Dutch firms).

Dutch companies are more likely to see the transition to stronger climate laws as an opportunity (39% vs 23% from other European firms).

==== Nuclear energy ====
Researchers in the Netherlands began studying nuclear power in the 1930s and began construction of research reactor Dodewaard in 1955. Researchers’ goal was to introduce nuclear power technology by 1962 and replace fossil fuels. In 1968, a test nuclear reactor was attached to the power grid. This unit was shut down in 1997. In the 1970s, the Dutch chose a policy that required reprocessing all spent nuclear fuel. In 1984, the government decided to create a long-term (100 years) storage facility for all intermediate and low-level radioactive waste and research strategies for ultimate disposal. In September 2003, the Central Organization for Radioactive Waste created an interim storage facility for high-level waste. The Netherlands' only commercial nuclear reactor is Borssele, which became operational in 1973 and as of 2011 produces about 4% of the country's electricity. The older Dodewaard nuclear power plant was a test reactor that later got attached to the national grid but was closed in 1997. A 2MW research reactor known as Reactor Institute Delft (RID) is located in Delft, as part of the physics department of Delft University of Technology. This reactor is not meant for energy provision but used as a neutron and positron source for research.

In 1994, the States General of the Netherlands voted to phase out nuclear power after a discussion of nuclear waste management. In 1997, the power station at Dodewaard was shut down and the government decided it was planning to end Borssele's operating license in 2003. This has since been postponed to 2034, if it complied with the highest safety standards. After the 2010 election, the new government was open to expanding nuclear power. Both of the companies that share ownership of Borssele are proposing to build new reactors. In January 2012, Delta announced it postpones any decision to start building a second nuclear power plant.

==== Renewable energy ====
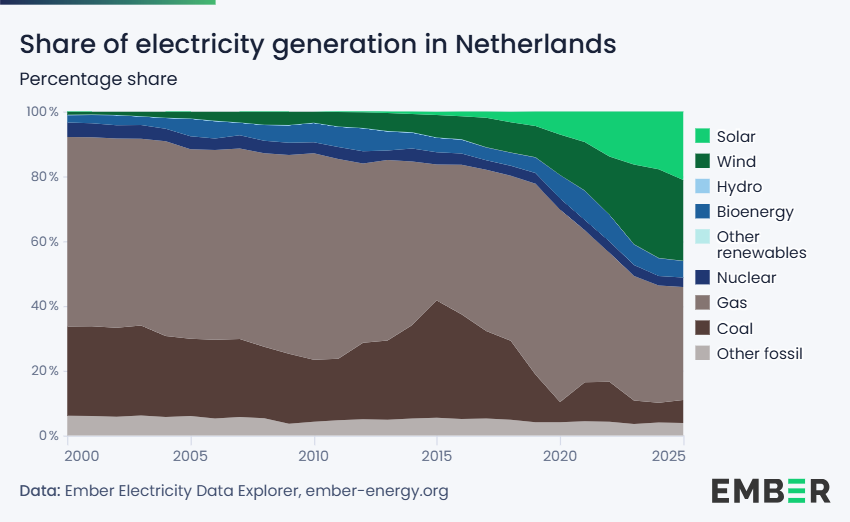
Netherlands electricity generation by source

Despite the historic usage of wind power to drain water and grind grain, the Netherlands today lags 21 of the 26 other member states of the European Union in the consumption of energy from renewable sources. In 2022, the Netherlands consumed just 15% of its total energy from renewables. According to statistics published by Eurostat, it was the last among the EU countries in the shift away from global warming-inducing energy sources. The leading renewable sources in the country are biomass, wind, solar and both geothermal and aerothermal power (mostly from ground source and air source heat pumps). In 2018 decisions were made to replace natural gas as the main energy source in the Netherlands with increased electrification being a major part of this process.

=== Transport ===
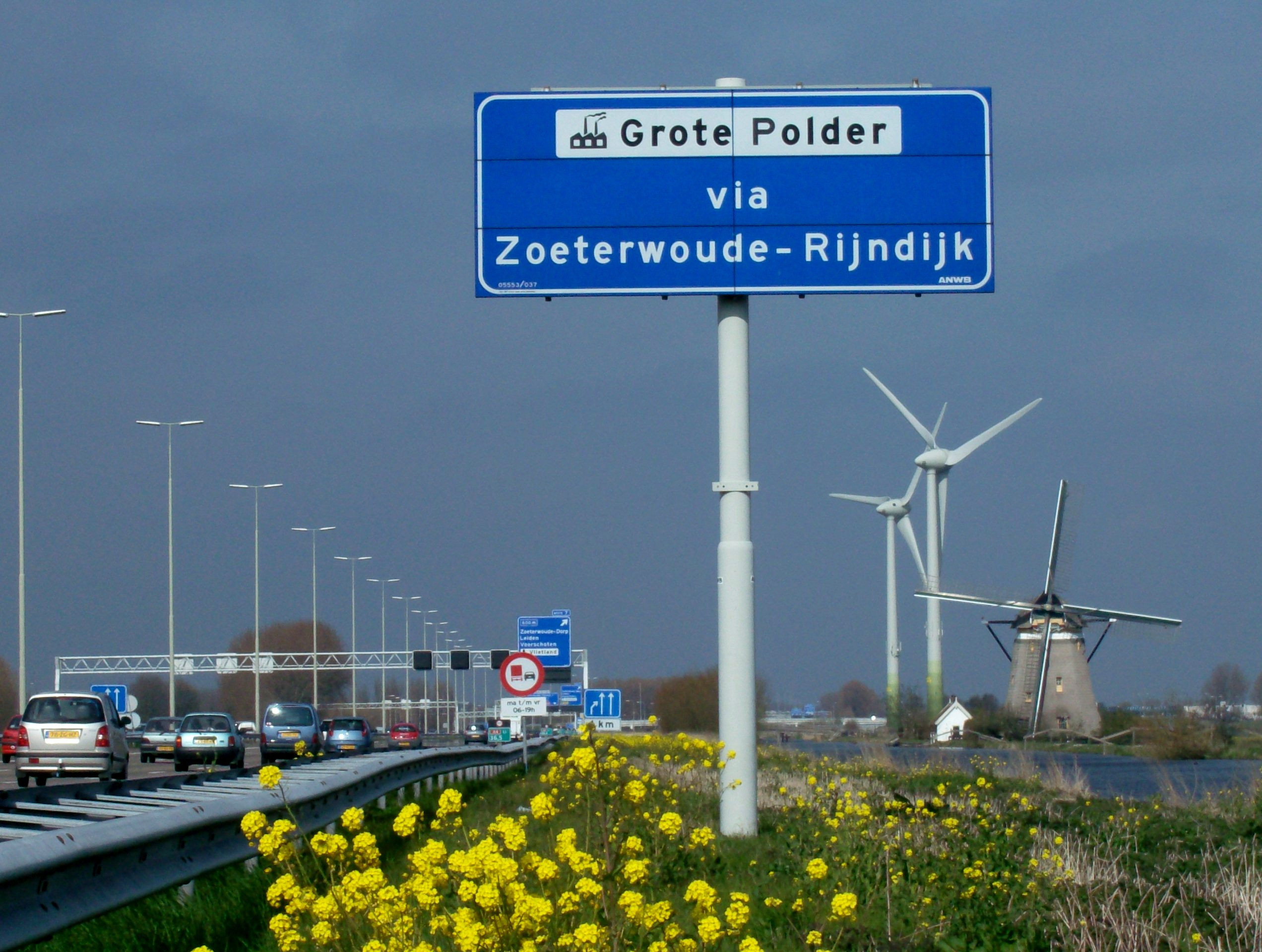
Traffic in the Netherlands

The Netherlands is both a very densely populated and a highly developed country in which transport is a key factor of the economy. Correspondingly it has a very dense and modern infrastructure, facilitating transport with road, rail, air and water networks. In its Global Competitiveness Report for 2014-2015, the World Economic Forum ranked the Dutch transport infrastructure fourth in the world.

With a total road network of 139,000 km, including 3,530 km of expressways, the Netherlands has one of the densest road networks in the world; much denser than Germany and France, though not as dense as Belgium. The Dutch also have a well developed railway network, that connects most towns and cities, as well as a comprehensive dedicated cycling infrastructure, featuring some 35,000 km of track physically segregated from motorised traffic.

The port of Rotterdam is the world's largest seaport outside East Asia, and the largest port of Europe. (Note: The Rotterdam mainport is about as big as Europe's 2nd and 3rd biggest ports combined, handling roughly the total cargo tonnage as those of Antwerp plus Hamburg respectively.) It connects with its hinterland in Germany, Switzerland and France through the rivers Rhine and Meuse. Two thirds of all inland water freight shipping within the EU, and 40% of containers, pass through the Netherlands. Additionally, the port of Amsterdam is Europe's fifth busiest seaport, according to Eurostat.

Mobility in the Netherlands is considerable. On the roads it has grown continuously since the 1950s and now exceeds 200 billion km travelled per year, three quarters of which are done by car. Around half of all trips in the Netherlands are made by car, 25% by bicycle, 20% walking, and 5% by public transport. Additionally, Dutch airports handled at least 70 million passengers in 2016. Excluding air travel, the Dutch journey more than 30 km a day on average, which takes them just over an hour.

In 2010, 1.65 billion tons of goods traffic was registered, half of which moved by sea and inland shipping, and 40% by road transport. The remainder was mostly by pipelines; rail transport only handles 2% of freight movements through the Netherlands.

=== Tourism ===
In 2011, the Netherlands was visited by 11.3 million foreign tourists. In 2012, the Dutch tourism industry contributed 5.4% in total to the country's GDP and 9.6% in total to its employment. With its global ranking of 147th and 83rd place for total contribution to respectively GDP and employment, tourism is a relatively small sector of the Dutch economy. North Holland was by far the most popular province for foreign tourists in 2011. Out of all 11.3 million tourists, 6 million visited North Holland. South Holland took the second place with 1.4 million. Germans, Britons and Belgians made up the majority of foreign tourists, respectively 3, 1.5 and 1.4 million. As of 2020, there are nine World Heritage Sites in the Netherlands. The Netherlands are well known for their art and rich historical heritage.

In the fast food restaurant and snackbar sector McDonald's dominates and employs the most staff, followed by Burger King, FEBO established as only national player, and Kwalitaria. Other chains in the Dutch market are Pizza Hut, Domino's Pizza, and Kentucky Fried Chicken. The Belgium chain Quick retreated from the Dutch market in 2000.

=== Water supply and sanitation ===
Water supply and sanitation in the Netherlands is provided in good quality and at a reasonable price to the entire population. Water consumption is one of the lowest in developed countries at 129 litres per capita per day and water leakage in the distribution network is one of the lowest in the world at only 6%.

A large array of institutions is responsible for providing water and sanitation services: 10 regional water companies provide drinking water, 352 municipalities are in charge of sewers, and 21 water boards treat wastewater. Two Ministries share responsibility for policy-making in the sector. A large number of knowledge institutes, NGOs and two business associations – VEWIN representing the interests of the water companies and UVW representing the water boards - complete the institutional landscape of the sector.

An interesting feature of the Dutch water sector is a performance benchmarking system for water companies first introduced in 1997, which has inspired similar efforts in other European countries. The Dutch parliament passed a law in 2004 banning private sector provision of water supply. However, while the water companies themselves remain publicly owned, they contract many services - such as customer service and repairs - out to the private sector.

== Trade and foreign investment ==
Exports of the Netherlands by product category (2019) Chemical products Transportation Machines Mineral products Plastics and rubbers Metals Foodstuffs Precious metals Textiles Instruments Animal products Vegetable products Paper goods Footwear and headwear Miscellaneous Stone and glass Wood products Animal and vegetable bi-products Animal hides Arts and antiques Weapons

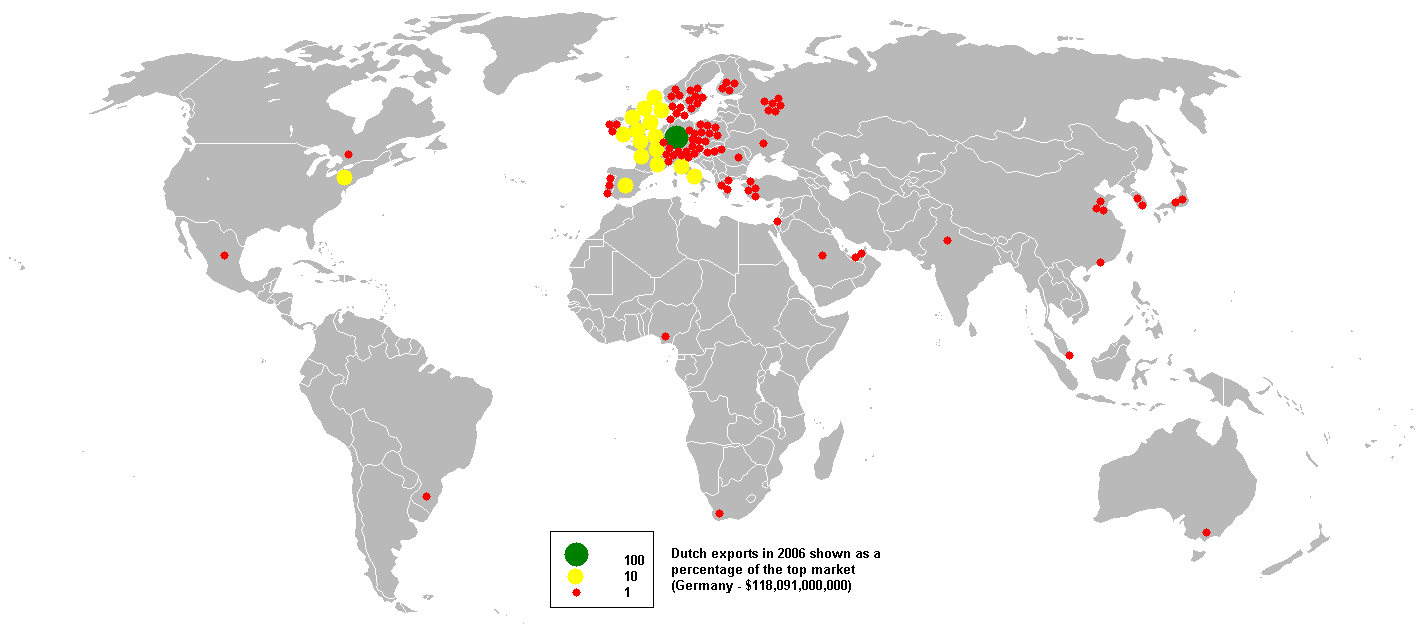
Dutch exports in 2006

In 2025, the Netherlands was the 5th-largest trading nation in the world in terms of combined exports and imports (after the United States, China, Germany and the United Kingdom).

The Netherlands’ main trading partners in 2016 were Germany and Belgium–Luxembourg, followed by the United Kingdom, the United States, China, and France.

The Netherlands continues to be one of the leading European nations for attracting foreign direct investment and is one of the five largest investors in the United States. The economy experienced a slowdown in 2005, but in 2006 recovered to the fastest pace in six years on the back of increased exports and strong investment. The pace of job growth reached 10-year highs in 2007. The Netherlands is the fifth-most competitive economy in the world, according to the World Economic Forum's Global Competitiveness Report of 2012-2013.

== Data ==
The following table shows the main economic indicators in 1980–2021 (with IMF staff estimates in 2022–2027). Inflation under 5% is in green.

Year	GDP (in bn. US$PPP)	GDP per capita (in US$ PPP)	GDP (in bn. US$nominal)	GDP per capita (in US$ nominal)	GDP growth (real)	Inflation rate (in Percent)	Unemployment (in Percent)	Government debt (in % of GDP)
1980	165.0	11,708.1	193.8	13,750.5	n/a	n/a	3.4%	43.6%
1981	▲179.7	▲12,644.4	▼162.4	▼11,429.7	▼-0.5%	▲6.8%	▲4.6%	▲46.9%
1982	▲188.3	▲13,181.8	▼157.3	▼11,013.6	▼-1.3%	▲5.9%	▲6.5%	▲52.5%
1983	▲199.1	▲13,886.6	▼153.2	▼10,682.3	▲1.8%	▲2.9%	▲8.3%	▲58.5%
1984	▲212.7	▲14,779.7	▼142.6	▼9,905.0	▲3.1%	▲3.4%	▼8.1%	▲62.0%
1985	▲225.3	▲15,587.9	▲144.7	▲10,008.0	▲2.7%	▲2.3%	▼7.3%	▲67.2%
1986	▲237.0	▲16,313.5	▲201.6	▲13,875.2	▲3.1%	n/a	▼6.5%	▲69.0%
1987	▲247.4	▲16,926.4	▲246.9	▲16,895.4	▲1.9%	▲-1.0%	▼6.3%	▲71.4%
1988	▲267.8	▲18,202.4	▲264.2	▲17,956.1	▲4.6%	▲0.5%	▼6.2%	▲73.8%
1989	▲290.8	▲19,643.3	▼260.5	▼17,597.3	▲4.5%	▲1.1%	▼5.7%	73.8%
1990	▲314.3	▲21,105.3	▲321.4	▲21,581.6	▲4.2%	▲2.5%	▼5.1%	▲75.1%
1991	▲332.9	▲22,178.4	▲331.1	▲22,057.8	▲2.5%	▲3.2%	▼4.8%	▼74.9%
1992	▲345.9	▲22,863.5	▲366.0	▲24,192.0	▲1.6%	▲2.8%	▲4.9%	▲75.7%
1993	▲358.6	▲23,530.1	▼355.9	▼23,356.3	▲1.3%	▲1.6%	▲5.5%	▲76.8%
1994	▲377.3	▲24,590.5	▲382.6	▲24,935.5	▲3.0%	▲2.1%	▲6.2%	▼73.6%
1995	▲395.8	▲25,664.2	▲452.7	▲29,350.8	▲2.8%	▲1.3%	▲7.7%	▼72.2%
1996	▲417.2	▲26,925.6	▼450.6	▼29,084.1	▲3.5%	▲1.4%	▼7.1%	▼70.5%
1997	▲442.7	▲28,440.8	▼417.3	▼26,808.4	▲4.3%	▲1.9%	▼6.1%	▼64.9%
1998	▲468.6	▲29,936.1	▲438.6	▲28,018.7	▲4.7%	▲1.8%	▼4.9%	▼61.7%
1999	▲499.1	▲31,671.1	▲447.5	▲28,393.8	▲5.0%	▲2.0%	▼4.1%	▼57.5%
2000	▲531.9	▲33,528.1	▼417.7	▼26,327.9	▲4.2%	▲2.3%	▼3.7%	▼50.9%
2001	▲556.5	▲34,811.4	▲431.6	▲26,996.2	▲2.3%	▲5.1%	▼3.1%	▼48.2%
2002	▲566.4	▲35,170.5	▲473.5	▲29,402.0	▲0.2%	▲3.9%	▲3.7%	▼47.5%
2003	▲578.5	▲35,727.5	▲579.9	▲35,814.3	▲0.2%	▲2.2%	▲5.9%	▲48.7%
2004	▲605.8	▲37,263.5	▲658.1	▲40,477.3	▲2.0%	▲1.4%	▲6.8%	▲49.1%
2005	▲637.6	▲39,104.4	▲685.7	▲42,054.9	▲2.0%	▲1.5%	▲7.0%	▼48.5%
2006	▲680.0	▲41,633.3	▲734.0	▲44,936.0	▲3.5%	▲1.7%	▼6.1%	▼44.1%
2007	▲724.8	▲44,306.7	▲848.7	▲51,880.4	▲3.8%	▲1.6%	▼5.3%	▼42.0%
2008	▲754.7	▲46,003.9	▲951.8	▲58,015.4	▲2.2%	▲2.2%	▼4.8%	▲53.8%
2009	▼731.7	▼44,383.2	▼870.6	▼52,807.4	▼-3.7%	▲1.0%	▲5.4%	▲55.8%
2010	▲750.4	▲45,274.1	▼848.1	▼51,165.8	▲1.3%	▲0.9%	▲6.1%	▲59.4%
2011	▲777.9	▲46,703.3	▲905.1	▲54,342.1	▲1.6%	▲2.5%	6.1%	▲61.8%
2012	▲792.0	▲47,341.6	▼839.5	▼50,175.6	▼-1.0%	▲2.8%	▲6.8%	▲66.4%
2013	▲827.5	▲49,314.5	▲877.2	▲52,277.0	▼-0.1%	▲2.6%	▲8.2%	▲67.8%
2014	▲830.3	▲49,337.7	▲892.4	▲53,026.5	▲1.4%	▲0.3%	▲8.3%	▲68.0%
2015	▲852.1	▲50,418.7	▼765.7	▼45,302.8	▲2.0%	▲0.2%	▼7.9%	▼64.6%
2016	▲890.4	▲52,440.8	▲783.8	▲46,165.2	▲2.2%	▲0.1%	▼7.0%	▼61.9%
2017	▲948.2	▲55,509.3	▲833.6	▲48,799.9	▲2.9%	▲1.3%	▼5.9%	▼56.9%
2018	▲993.8	▲57,839.9	▲914.5	▲53,224.7	▲2.4%	▲1.6%	▼4.9%	▼52.4%
2019	▲1,031.3	▲59,674.9	▼910.3	▼52,672.5	▲2.0%	▲2.7%	▼4.4%	▼48.5%
2020	▼1,002.9	▼57,612.5	▼909.1	▼52,222.4	▼-3.9%	▲1.1%	▲4.9%	▲54.6%
2021	▲1,095.4	▲62,685.0	▲1,013.5	▲57,996.9	▲4.9%	▲2.8%	▼4.2%	▼52.3%
2022	▲1,226.7	▲69,714.5	▼990.6	▼56,297.8	▲4.5%	▲12.0%	▼3.5%	▼48.3%
2023	▲1,280.5	▲72,363.5	▲1,019.8	▲57,628.6	▲0.8%	▲8.0%	▲3.9%	▼46.4%
2024	▲1,329.6	▲74,842.4	▲1,077.0	▲60,620.9	▲1.7%	▲2.7%	▲4.0%	▼45.6%
2025	▲1,376.0	▲77,235.7	▲1,125.5	▲63,173.5	▲1.6%	▲2.3%	▲4.2%	▲46.2%
2026	▲1,424.2	▲79,717.7	▲1,173.5	▲65,684.3	▲1.6%	▲2.0%	▲4.4%	▲47.2%
2027	▲1,474.1	▲82,280.9	▲1,223.4	▲68,285.1	▲1.5%	▲2.0%	▲4.6%	▲48.1%

== Companies ==
In 2022, the sector with the highest number of companies registered in Netherlands is Services with 761,749 companies followed by Finance, Insurance, and Real Estate and Retail Trade with 693,255 and 101,025 companies respectively.

In the Netherlands, 91% of enterprises say they have invested appropriately during the past three years (2023 - 2020). This beats the EU average at 82%. Compared to other enterprises in the EU, Dutch firms prioritise new goods or services (26% vs. 34% for replacement). In keeping with the EU average of 10%, just 7% of enterprises in the Netherlands do not plan to invest. Dutch companies were hurt by the energy crisis in 2022 - 2023, albeit to a lower extent than those elsewhere in the EU. While most companies are concerned about energy prices, just 30% consider it a critical issue. This is half of the EU average (59%).

Dutch firms face significant long-term hurdles to investment, including a lack of trained people (71%), and high energy prices (66%). Barriers are diminishing, with numbers lower than the EU average and than 2021. For example, the availability of funding is less of an impediment than across the EU (23% versus 44%).

In 2023, one in ten Dutch enterprises (13%) brought new goods, processes, or services to the Dutch or global market. Majority of Dutch firms are also more technologically oriented than EU peers - almost eight out of ten Dutch firms (78%) employed at least one digital technology in 2023. The EU average is 70%. The majority of Dutch firms utilise digital platform technologies (59%), robots (56%), and the Internet of Things (55%), whereas just a small percentage use 3D printing (19%) or augmented/VR technology (15%).

=== Largest companies ===
The Netherlands is home to several large multinationals including Heineken, Ahold, Philips, TomTom, Randstad NV and ING, all of which have their headquarters in Amsterdam. Thousands of companies of non-Dutch origin have their headquarters in the Netherlands, like EADS, LyondellBasell and IKEA, because of attractive corporate tax levels.

The Netherlands' biggest companies in the Fortune Global 500 as of 2022 are as following:

Rank	Fortune 500 rank	Name	Industry	Revenue (USD millions)	Profits (USD millions)	Assets (USD millions)	Employees	Headquarters
▲1	▲29	Stellantis	Automotive	176,663.0	16,789.1	195,297.9	281,595	Hoofddorp
▲2	▲115	Ahold Delhaize	Retail	89,385.6	2,655.5	51,974.5	259,000	Zaandam
▲3	▲200	Aegon	Financial services	63,662.7	2,341.0	532,402.5	22,271	The Hague
▼3	▼207	Airbus	Aerospace and defense	61,657.5	4,981.2	121,712.4	126,495	Leiden
▲4	▲276	Louis Dreyfus Company	Food production	49,569.0	697.0	23,626.0	15,737	Rotterdam
▲5	▲287	INGKA Holding	Retail	47,545.8	1,887.1	65,010.9	174,225	Leiden
▲6	▲305	LyondellBasell	Chemicals	46,173.0	5,610.0	36,742.0	19,100	Rotterdam
▼7	▼425	ING Group	Banking	33,851.4	7,036.1	1,079,297.3	57,660	Amsterdam
▲8	▲477	X5 Group	Retail	29,921.7	580.0	17,164.8	340,928	The Hague
▼9	▼491	Randstad NV	Consulting	29,126.8	908.0	12,552.5	39,530	Diemen

=== Mergers and acquisitions ===
In the Netherlands 22,484 deals were conducted between 1985 and 2018, with an overall value of 2,226.6 billion USD. The year with the most deals was 2000, with 1,169 deals. The year with the highest overall value was 2007, with almost 394.9 billion USD. However this was followed by a drastic slump during the Great Recession.

List of the most important acquisitions within, into and out of the Netherlands
Date announced	Acquiror			Target			Value of transaction (USD millions)
Date announced	Name	Mid-industry	Nation	Name	Mid-industry	Nation	Value of transaction (USD millions)
25 April 2007	RFS Holdings BV	Other Financials	Netherlands	ABN-AMRO Holding NV	Banks	Netherlands	98,189.19
19 March 2007	Barclays PLC	Banks	United Kingdom	ABN-AMRO Holding NV	Banks	Netherlands	92,606.80
28 October 2004	Royal Dutch Petroleum Co	Oil & Gas	Netherlands	Shell Transport & Trading Co	Oil & Gas	United Kingdom	74,558.58
4 August 2015	Royal Dutch Shell PLC	Petrochemicals	Netherlands	BG Group PLC	Oil & Gas	United Kingdom	69,445.02
2 March 2016	CNAC Saturn (NL) BV	Chemicals	Netherlands	Syngenta AG	Chemicals	Switzerland	41,840.11
27 January 2006	Mittal Steel Co NV	Metals & Mining	Netherlands	Arcelor SA	Metals & Mining	Luxembourg	32,240.47
3 September 2017	PPG Industries Inc	Chemicals	United States	Akzo Nobel NV	Chemicals	Netherlands	26,560.76
4 August 2015	Royal Dutch Shell PLC	Petrochemicals	Netherlands	Royal Dutch Shell PLC	Petrochemicals	Netherlands	25,000.00
29 September 2008	The Netherlands	National Government	Netherlands	Fortis Bank Nederland(Holding)	Banks	Netherlands	23,137.31
10 April 2010	VimpelCom Ltd	Wireless	Netherlands	Weather Investments Srl	Telecommunications Services	Italy	22,382.31

== Caribbean Netherlands ==
- Economy of Bonaire
- Economy of Saba
- Economy of Sint Eustatius

The wider Dutch Kingdom

- Economy of Aruba
- Economy of Curacao
- Economy of Sint Maarten

== See also ==
- Bureau for Economic Policy Analysis
- De Nederlandsche Bank (Central Bank of The Netherlands)
- List of companies of the Netherlands
- Ministry of Finance
- Polder Model (Dutch version of consensus policy in economics)
- Social-Economic Council (economic advisory council of the Dutch government)
- Taxation in the Netherlands
- VNO-NCW (Confederation of Netherlands Industry and Employers)
- Amsterdam Stock Exchange
