= Culture of Saba (island) =

Saba's culture bears the influence of its early settlers, among them the English, Scottish, Africans, and Dutch. Because Saba measures only five square miles and has a treacherous coastline (making invasion difficult), its population has always been small. Today its population numbers about 1,500 people, with approximately 250 being expatriates. Many of the non-Sabans teach at or attend the Saba University School of Medicine.

Although archaeologists have found evidence of early Amerindian presence, a group of shipwrecked Englishmen in 1632 found the island uninhabited. During the colonial period, Saba's ownership changed hands many times between the Spanish, English, Dutch, and French. Although part of the Netherlands Antilles since 1954, Saba's official languages (along with those of Sint Maarten and Sint Eustatius) are both Dutch and English, since the majority of Sabans speak English as their first language. English has been added to Saba's school curriculum by the Dutch government as a result.

Most Sabans are descended from a handful of families. Hassell, Simmons, and Johnson are common surnames. Early settlers relied on farming, fishing, sailing, and shipbuilding for their livings; pirates sought haven there, too. They passed down a hardy nature necessary to survive the island's conditions.

Because of its difficult terrain (the island is a dormant volcano rising out of the sea), modern conveniences were slow in coming to Saba. In 1938, construction began to connect its four villages with a road – a feat which engineers had said was impossible due to the island's perilous landscape. Full-time electricity only became available in the 1970s. Its houses have a quaint, cottage look with red roofs. The lifestyle is still slow and old-fashioned with little nightlife, even with the emergence of an ecotourism industry in the last few decades. Sabans are proud of their history of environmental conservation, calling Saba "The Unspoiled Queen".

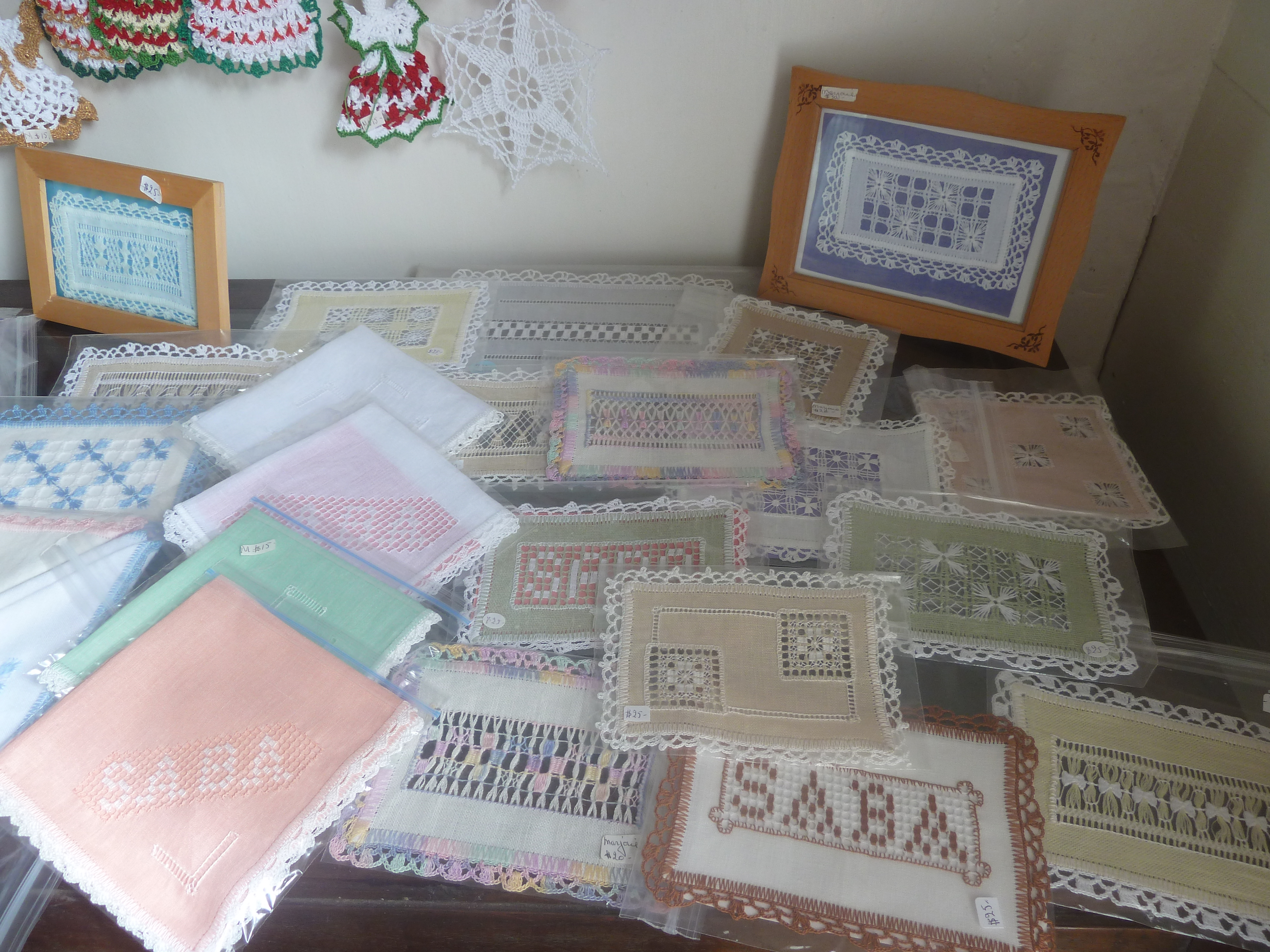
Saba Lace, Harry L Johnson Museum, Windwardside, Saba, Jan 2012

Saban women continue to make two traditional island products, Saba lace and Saba spice. Saba lace is handstitched; the island's women began making it in the late 19th century and built this into a thriving mail-order business with the United States. Saba spice is a rum drink, brewed with a combination of spices.

As in other Caribbean locations, Sabans throw an annual carnival. Saba's carnival takes place the last week in July and includes parades, steel bands, competitions, and food.

Catholicism is Saba's predominant religion. Other faiths practised on the island include Anglicanism, Seventh-day Adventism, Wesleyan Holiness, Islam, Jehovah's Witnesses, and Judaism.

== See also ==
- Saba National Marine Park
- Economy of Saba
