= Healthcare in the Netherlands =

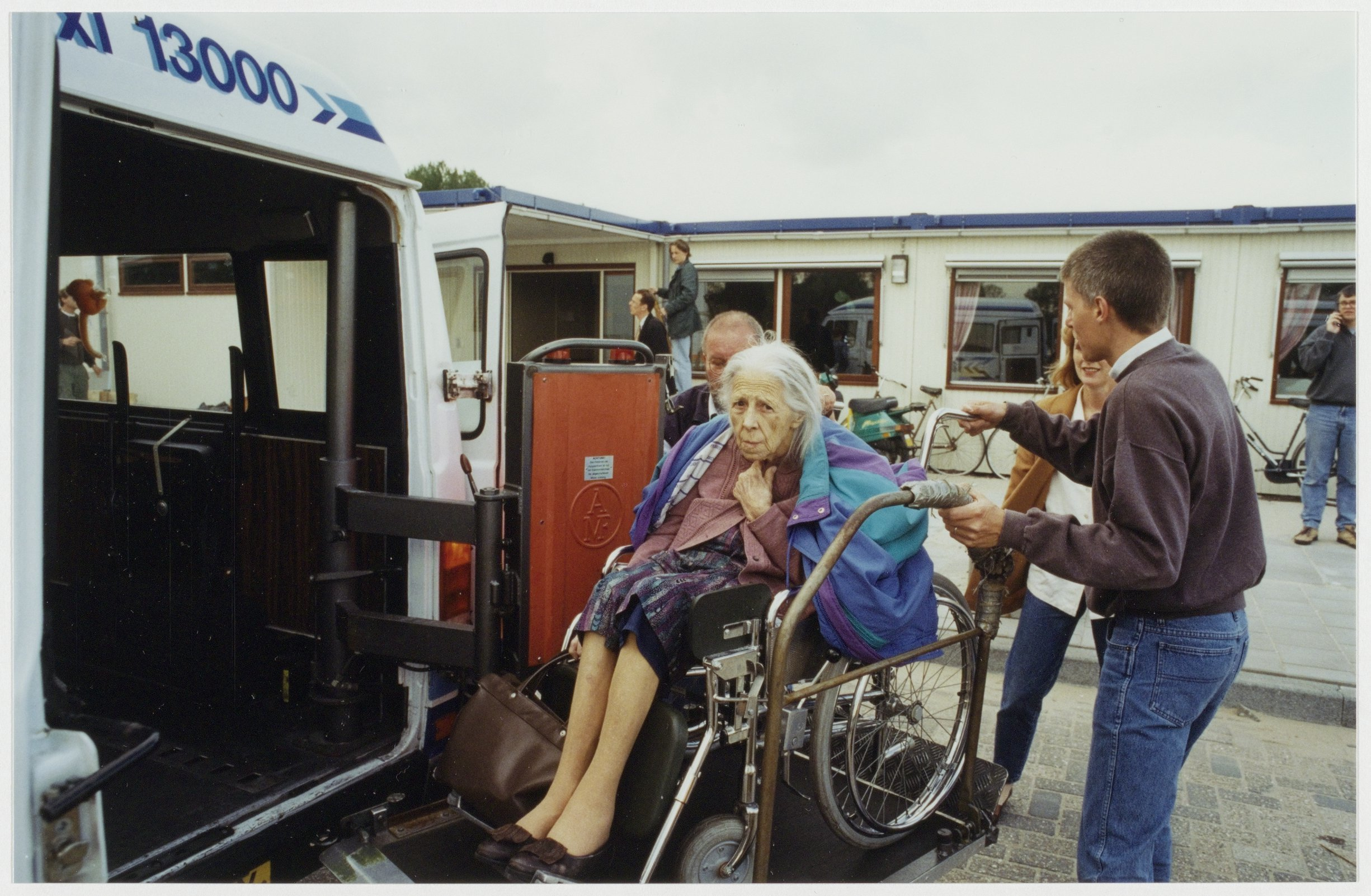
Charlotte Martinot, former opera singer is transferred to the Boerhaave clinic from her nursing home which was under renovation

Healthcare in the Netherlands is differentiated along three dimensions (1) level (2) physical versus mental and (3) short term versus long term care.

The three levels indicate how a patient is referred throughout the system. The first level is the level where people go to with health issues. This consists of mainly Huisartsen (U.S.: physicians / U.K.: general practitioners; lit.: home doctors), often organised in "huisartsenposten" ((acute) GP/primary medical centers) to ensure 24/7 availability, and emergency rooms ("SpoedEisende Hulp / SEH") at hospitals. These first level caretakers can refer patient to specialised care, at hospital, extramural or long term care. Without such referral access to second level care public healthcare centers, and under most health insurance schemes is generally not possible. For specialised care patients can be referred to third level care - either by first level or second level practitioners. Third level care consists of highly specialised care such as nuclear treatment. Third level care is generally embedded in University Hospitals.

From 2012 to 2020, health care spending declined from 10.9 percent to 10.5 percent of GDP.

== History ==
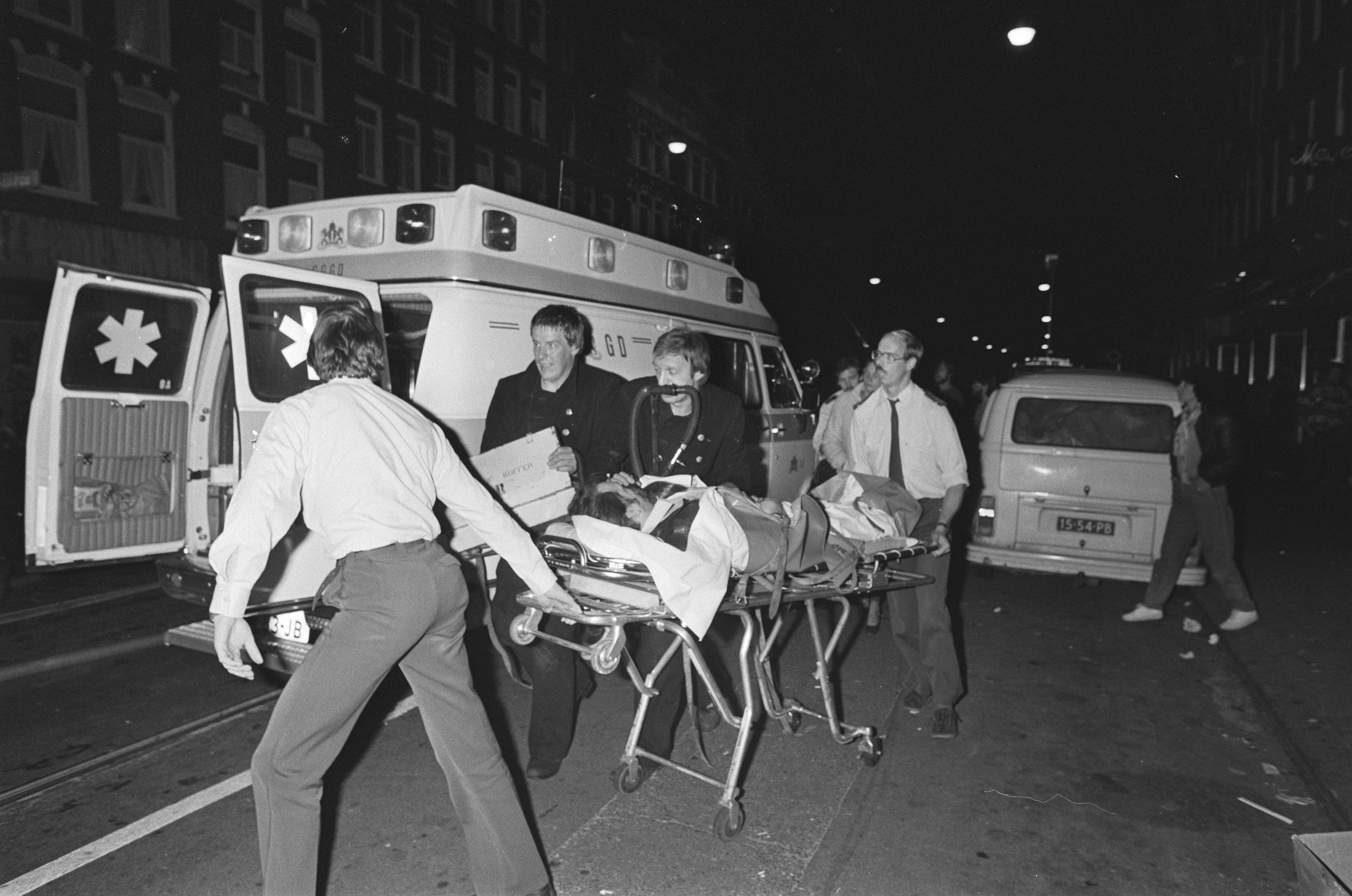
A patient is transported in to an ambulance in Amsterdam, 26 September 1980

From 1941 to 2006, there were separate public and private systems of short-term health insurance. The public insurance system was implemented by non-profit health funds, and financed by premiums taken directly out of the wages (together with income taxes). Everyone earning less than a certain threshold qualified for the public insurance system, while anyone with income over that threshold was obliged to have private insurance instead. About two-thirds of the country's residents were covered under the health fund, while the remaining third had private health insurance. With increasing healthcare costs this system was no longer sustainable. Patrick Jeurissen, a professor at Radboud University Nijmegen was quoted in Vox as saying "The old system had really hit a wall" due to rising costs.

In 2006, a new system of health care insurance plan was implemented, based on risk equalization through a risk equalization pool. A compulsory insurance basic package is available to all citizens. Dutch residents who do not enrol for insurance are automatically signed up for a basic insurance package and charged additional rates of 20% on top of voluntary tariffs. Insurance companies have to accept everyone applying to this package and are not allowed to differentiate or assess health risk of individuals when setting price levels. Health insurers receive compensation for high risk individuals from the government, and government subsidies pay about 75% of insurance costs. Most insurance companies operate as not for profits. As of January 2020, the average annual insurance premium was about 1,400 Euro. Payments can be either direct or a refund of costs made with a healthcare service contracted by the insurance company. The basic package requires patients to pay the first €385 annually themselves. Individuals can choose for a higher initial personal payment (up to €885) for a discount. Basic care such as first appointments with the family doctor, flu vaccinations are exempted from personal payment to ensure everyone can access such basic care.

== Acute and primary care ==
112 (emergency telephone number)

The Netherlands has a network of 160 acute primary care centres, open 24 hours a day, 7 days a week, making an open clinic within easy reach for most people. Acute primary care is offered by a combination of 121 general practice health centers, that are open outside office hours, and a total of 94 medical emergency units with surgery facilities, of which 90 are at hospital locations, open 24/7. In 71 cases general practice services and emergency rooms are found in one hospital location, bringing the total number of locations where acute care is offered to 160. Analysis by the Netherlands National Institute for Public Health and the Environment showed that 99.8 percent of the people can be transported to an emergency unit / casualty ward, or a hospital offering emergency obstetrics within 45 minutes in 2015.

For acute medical questions outside one's home doctor's office hours, a general doctors health practice can be called by phone, and advice will be given by the doctor and their assistant. If the issue seems to be urgent, the caller will be advised to come to the practice, and if necessary referred to an emergency room for more serious treatment. For severe medical emergencies, the Netherlands uses 112 to call an ambulance.

As measured in defined daily doses per 1,000 inhabitants per day the Netherlands had a very low rate of consumption of antibiotics in 2015 with a rate of 9.8.

=== Electronic health records ===
The vast majority of GPs and all pharmacies and hospitals use Electronic health records. In hospitals, computerized order management and medical imaging systems (PACS) are widely accepted. Whereas healthcare institutions continue to upgrade their EHR's functionalities, the national infrastructure is still far from being generally accepted.

In 2012 the national EHR restarted under the joint ownership of GPs, pharmacies and hospitals. A major change is that, as of January 2013, patients have to give their explicit permission that their data may be exchanged over the national infrastructure.

The national EHR is a virtual EHR and is a reference server which "knows" in which local EHR what kind of patient record is stored.

EDIFACT still is the most common way to exchange patient information electronically between hospitals and GP's.

== Screening ==
The Dutch government mandates three screenings for its citizens, including breast (every two years for women between the ages of 50 and 75), cervical (every five years for women between the ages of 30 and 60) and colorectal cancer (every five years for men and women between the ages of 55 and 75). In addition, there is prenatal screening for infectious diseases for pregnant women and foetuses, testing for Down's syndrome, Edward's syndrome and Patau's syndrome, structural ultrasound scanning, SEO ultrasound, hearing tests for newborns, and neonatal heel prick.

GPs in the Netherlands do not recommend annual health screening. However, companies are still required to conduct annual physicals for their employees.

== Hospitals ==
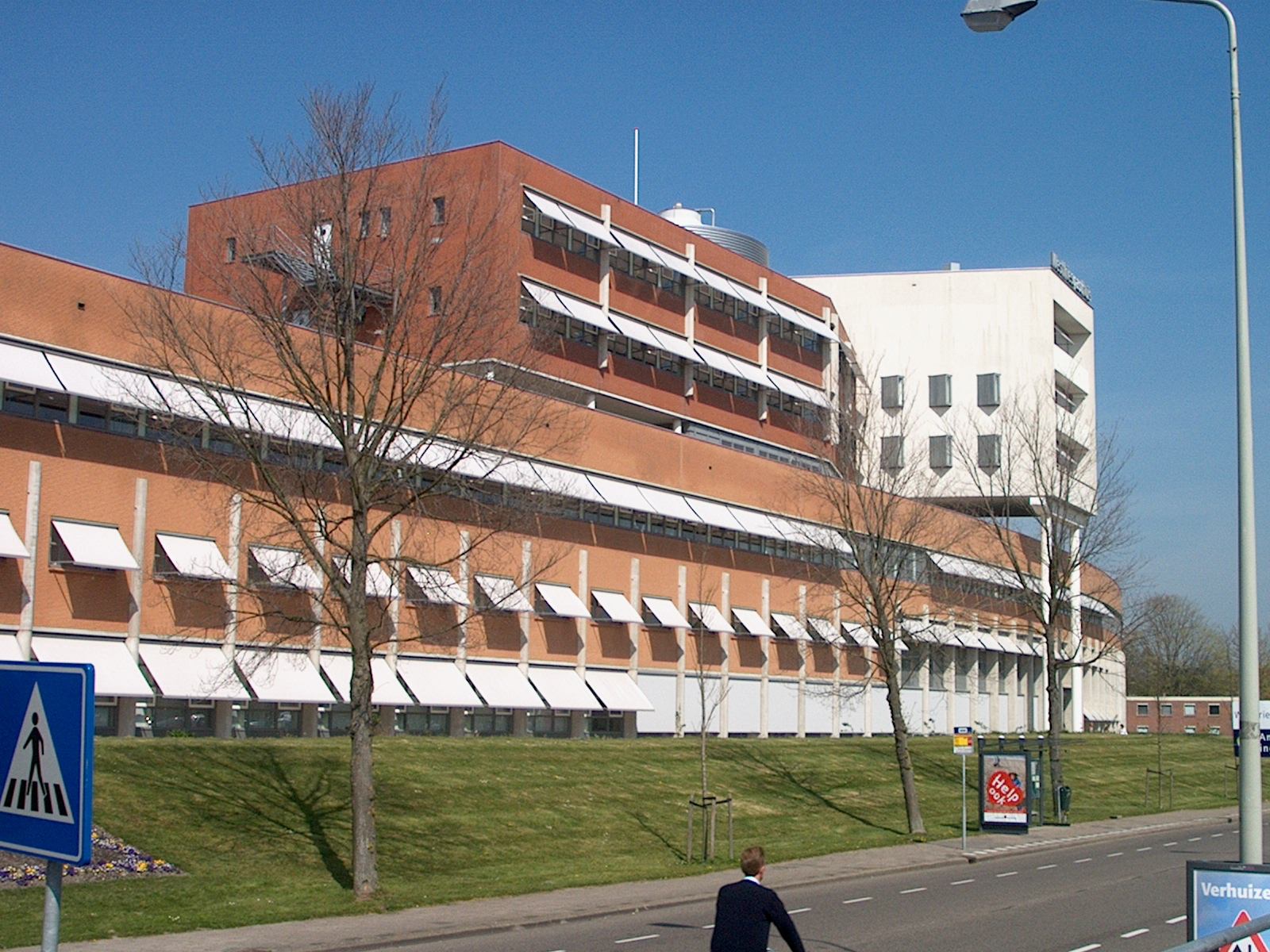
West Frisian Hospital in Hoorn, the Netherlands

Most hospitals and health insurers in the Netherlands are privately run, non-profit foundations, whereas most healthcare insurers are non-profit companies.

In general, there are three types of hospitals in the Netherlands: university hospitals, general hospitals, and a category in between that call themselves "top-clinical" teaching hospitals. There are eight academic hospitals, or university medical centers, each of which is directly connected with the medicine faculty of a major Dutch university. These are the largest hospitals in the country, and they have the largest number and greatest variety of specialists and researchers working in them. They are able to provide the most complex and specialised treatment.

There are some 90 hospital organisations in the Netherlands, with some of them running multiple actual physical hospitals, usually as a result of mergers of previously independent hospitals. Between 26 and 28 hospital organizations are members of the STZ (Samenwerkende Topklinische opleidingsZiekenhuizen), the collaborative association of top-clinical teaching hospitals. Although not directly tied to one particular university, these are large hospitals that house the full range of medical specialists (hence "top-clinical"), and that can offer both standard and complex care. The top-clinical teaching hospitals collaborate with university hospitals to aid in the education of nurses and medicine students, as well as to offer certain more specialised treatments. Interns frequently accompany doctors during procedures. Aside from training a lot of medical professionals, each top-clinical hospital specializes in one or two specific disciplines, and conducts its own research to stay ahead in its particular field of expertise. The research done is particularly patient-centric, and focused on improving the practical application and achieving the best results for patients. The remaining general hospitals provide high standard healthcare for less specialised problems. They will, if necessary, refer patients to more specialised facilities.

Unless it is an emergency, a hospital visit in the Netherlands must require a referral from a medical professional (e.g. GP).

== International comparisons ==
As of 2025, the Netherlands had the 7th lowest share of out-of-pocket payments for healthcare in Europe, but was significantly above the European average in amounts of money paid out of pocket, with 707€ per year per inhabitant compared to the EU average of 542€.

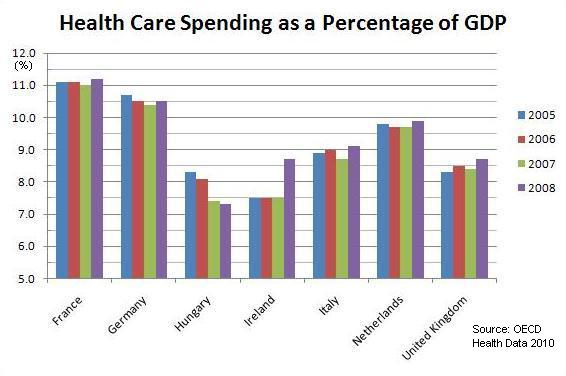
Total health spending as a percentage of GDP for the Netherlands compared with several other European nations from 2005 to 2008

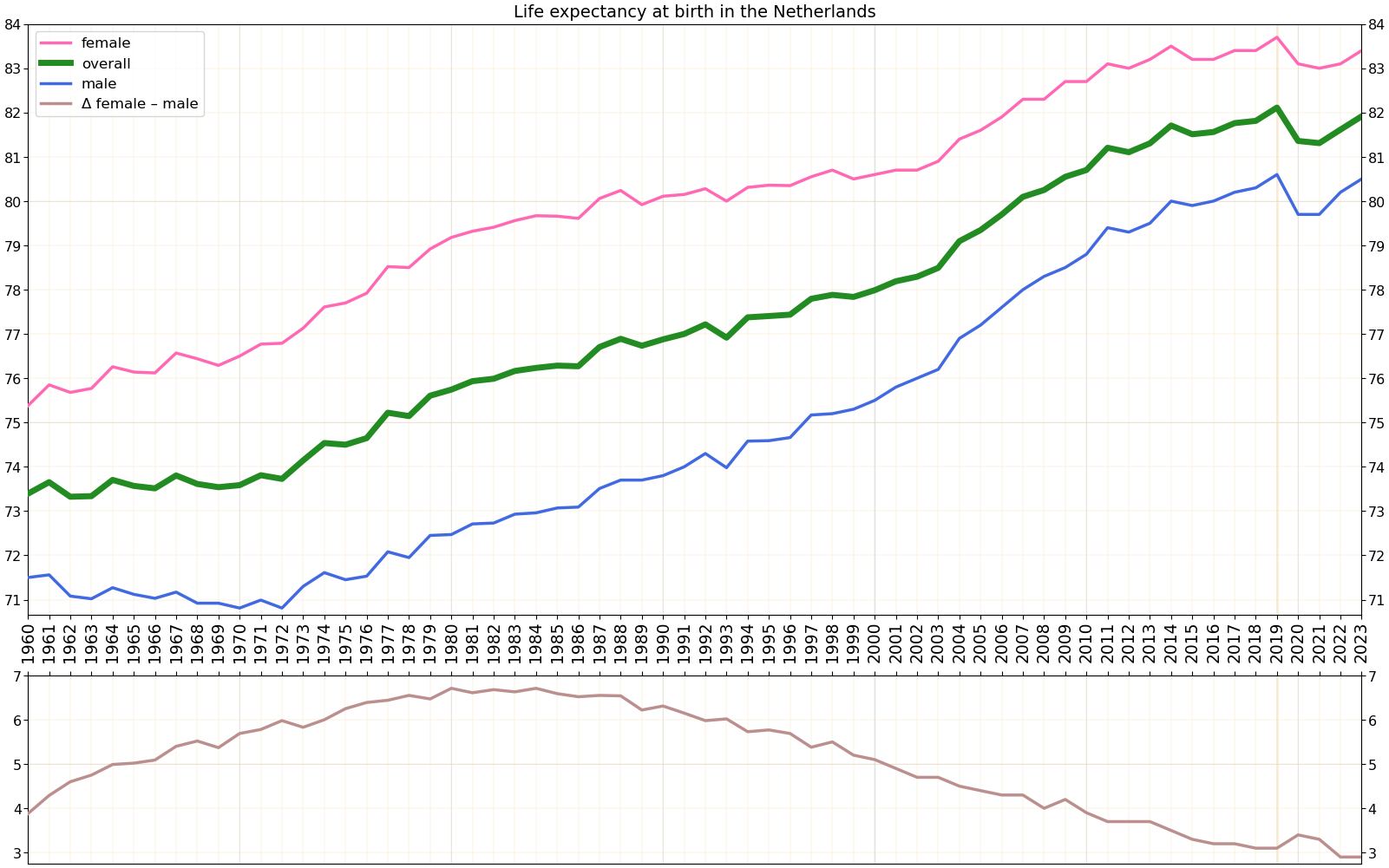
Life expectancy development in the Netherlands by gender

In 2015 the Netherlands maintained its number one position at the top of the annual Euro health consumer index, which compares healthcare systems in Europe, scoring 916 of a maximum 1,000 points. The Netherlands is the only country that has been in the top three ranking in every Euro health consumer index published since 2005. On 48 indicators such as patient rights and information, accessibility, prevention and outcomes, the Netherlands secured its top position among 37 European countries for the fifth year in a row. The Netherlands was also ranked first in a study comparing the health care systems of the United States, Australia, Canada, Germany and New Zealand.

Ever since a major reform of the health care system in 2006, the Dutch system received more points in the Index each year. According to the Health Consumer Powerhouse, the Netherlands has 'a chaos system', meaning patients have a great degree of freedom from where to buy their health insurance, to where they get their healthcare service. But the difference between the Netherlands and other countries is that the chaos is managed. Healthcare decisions are being made in a dialogue between the patients and healthcare professionals.

In November 2007 the leading peer-reviewed journal of health policy thought and research published the results of a survey of adults' health care experiences in the Netherlands, Germany and five English-speaking countries. The survey Toward Higher-Performance Health Systems concluded that the Dutch public stood out for its positive views. Of the Dutch adults surveyed, 59 percent said that they were very confident of receiving high quality and safe health care, compared to only 35 percent of the American adults surveyed.

Based on public statistics, patient polls, and independent research the Netherlands ranks at or near the best health care system of 32 European countries. In 2009, Health Consumer Powerhouse research director, Dr. Arne Bjornberg, commented:

As the Netherlands [is] expanding [its] lead among the best performing countries, the [Euro Health Consumer] Index indicates that the Dutch might have found a successful approach. It combines competition for funding and provision within a regulated framework. There are information tools to support active choice among consumers. The Netherlands [has] started working on patient empowerment early, which now clearly pays off in many areas. And politicians and bureaucrats are comparatively far removed from operative decisions on delivery of Dutch healthcare services!

About 2.7% of the doctors are from overseas, as compared with the United Kingdom, where almost 30% are.

== Waiting times ==
Waiting lists in the Netherlands increased since the 1980s due to budgets imposed on the hospital sector Several changes were implemented to reduce waiting times by increasing supply of hospital care. In 2001, fixed hospital budgets were replaced with (capped) activity-based payments to hospitals. In addition government limits which had lengthened waits by limiting the number of hospital specialists eligible for payment from Social Health Insurance funds (covering 2/3s of the population) was removed. Mean waits for all inpatient cases fell from 8.6 weeks to 5.5 in 2003, and from 6.4 to 5.1 weeks for outpatient cases.

In 2005, as part of health care reforms, a per-case payment system for hospital care was introduced. Over time, the percent of cases where hospitals and insurers could negotiate the volume and price of each type of case increased. Health insurers also monitored waiting times (which hospitals must publish), and assisted patients with finding the shortest waits (sometimes abroad). Specialists's fixed lump-sum payments were replaced with a payment per patient case, which increased their activity greatly. Mean waits for most surgery were 5 weeks or less by 2011.

In 2010, 70% of Dutch respondents to the Commonwealth Fund 2010 Health Policy Survey in 11 Countries said they waited less than 4 weeks to see a specialist. A further 16% said they waited 2 months or more. Regarding surgery, 59% reported waiting less than 4 weeks for elective surgery and only 5% waited 4 months or more, similar to American respondents.

== Finance ==
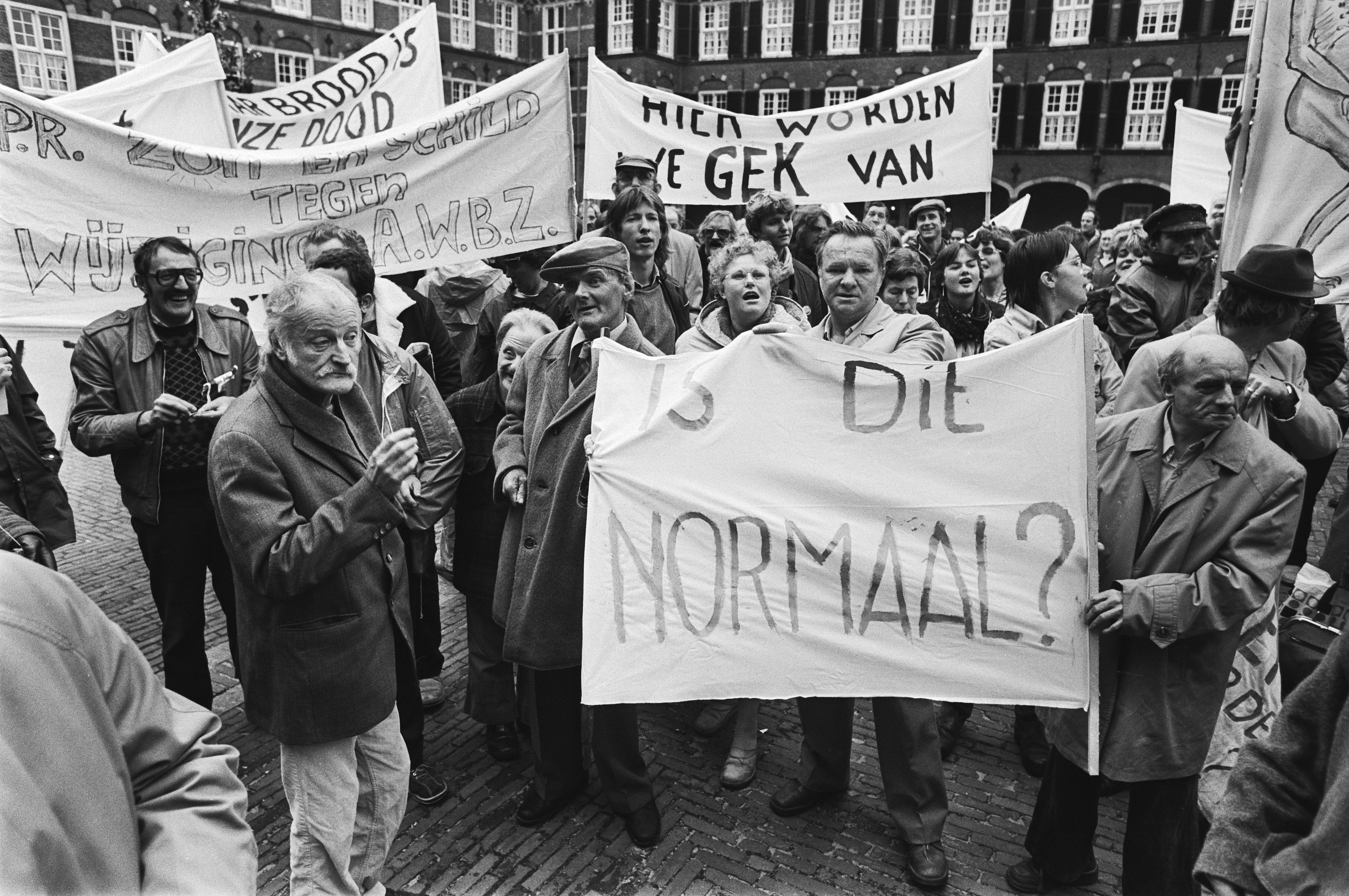
Patients rights demonstration against co-pays increasing under the AWBZ, 1982

Health insurance in the Netherlands is mandatory, and the nation's healthcare is covered by two statutory forms of insurance:

- Zorgverzekeringswet (Zvw), often called "basic insurance', covers common medical care.
- Wet langdurige zorg (Wlz) covers long-term nursing and care. (Formerly known as Algemene Wet Bijzondere Ziektekosten (AWBZ)).

While Dutch residents are automatically insured by the government for Wlz, everyone has to take out their own basic healthcare insurance (basisverzekering), except those under 18 who are automatically covered under their parents' premium. If you do not take out insurance, you risk a fine. Insurers have to offer a universal package for everyone over the age of 18 years, regardless of age or state of health – in most cases it is illegal to refuse an application or impose special conditions, but not always. In contrast to many other European systems, the Dutch government is responsible for the accessibility and quality of the healthcare system in the Netherlands, but not in charge of its management.

Healthcare in the Netherlands is financed by a dual system that came into effect in January 2006. Long-term treatments, especially those that involve semi-permanent hospitalization, and also disability costs such as wheelchairs, are covered by a state-controlled mandatory insurance. This is laid down in the Wet langdurige zorg ("General Law on Longterm Healthcare") which first came into effect in 1968 under the name of Algemene Wet Bijzondere Ziektekosten (AWBZ). In 2009 this insurance covered 27% of all health care expenses.

For all regular (short-term) medical treatment, there is a system of obligatory health insurance, with private health insurance companies. These insurance companies are obliged to provide a package with a defined set of insured treatments. This insurance covers 41% of all health care expenses.

Other sources of health care payment are taxes (14%), out of pocket payments (9%), additional optional health insurance packages (4%) and a range of other sources (4%). Affordability is guaranteed through a system of income-related allowances and individual and employer-paid income-related premiums.

A key feature of the Dutch system is that premiums may not be related to health status or age. Risk varies between private health insurance companies due to the different risks presented by individual policy holders are compensated through risk equalization and a common risk pool. Funding for all short-term health care is 50% from employers, 45% from the insured person and 5% by the government. Children under 18 are covered for free. Those on low incomes receive subsidies (zorgtoeslag) to help them pay their insurance. Premiums paid by the insured are, on average, €159 per month for basic health care (basisverzekering) (about US$166 in 2025) with variation of about 10% between the various competing insurers, and a mandatory deductible (eigen risico) of €385 (US$401) (since 2020).

Dutch care and social-support systems also allow eligible recipients to receive a personal budget (persoonsgebonden budget, PGB), enabling them to arrange and purchase their own care services instead of using contracted providers.

== Insurance ==
The Netherlands has a dual-level system. All primary and curative care (i.e. the family doctor service and hospitals and clinics) is financed from private mandatory insurance. Long term care for the elderly, the dying, the long term mentally ill etc. is covered by social insurance funded from earmarked taxation under the provisions of the Algemene Wet Bijzondere Ziektekosten, which came into effect in 1968.

Private insurance companies are mandated to offer a core universal insurance package for the universal primary curative care, which includes the cost of all prescription medicines, at a fixed price for all. The same premium is paid whether young or old, healthy or sick. It is illegal in the Netherlands for insurers to refuse an application for health insurance or to impose special conditions (e.g. exclusions, deductibles, co-payments, or refuse to fund doctor-ordered treatments). The system is 50% financed from payroll taxes paid by employers to a fund controlled by the Health regulator. The government contributes an additional 5% to the regulator's fund. The remaining 45% is collected as premiums paid by the insured directly to the insurance company. Some employers negotiate bulk deals with health insurers and some even pay the employees' premiums as an employment benefit. All insurance companies receive additional funding from the regulator's fund.

The regulator oversees the claims made by policyholders and therefore can redistribute the funds it holds on the basis of relative claims made by policy holders. Thus insurers with high payouts receive more from the regulator than those with low payouts. Thus insurance companies have no incentive to deter high cost individuals from taking insurance and are compensated if they have to pay out more than a threshold. This threshold is set above the expected costs. Insurance companies compete with each other on price for the 45% direct premium part of the funding and should try to negotiate deals with hospitals to keep costs low and quality high. The competition regulator is charged with checking for abuse of dominant market positions and the creation of cartels that act against the consumer interests. An insurance regulator ensures that all basic policies have identical coverage rules so that no person is medically disadvantaged by his or her choice of insurer.

Insurance companies can offer additional services at extra cost over and above the universal system laid down by the regulator, e.g. for dental care. The standard monthly premium for health care paid by individual adults is about €159 per month. People on low incomes can get assistance from the government if they cannot afford these payments. Children under 18 are insured by the system at no additional cost to them or their families, because the insurance company receives the cost of this from the regulator's fund.

Dutch consumers and expats working in the Netherlands who are obliged to be mandatorily insured by Dutch law have the opportunity to switch insurance companies each year. The health insurance companies have to publish the premium for the coming year before the open enrollment period. Any health insurance costs in the case of cancellation will be covered by the current health insurance agency until the switch is finalized.

In 2022 a significant price increase for health insurance was expected. The basic health insurance package was increased by 127 euros to 1,649 euros per year. Health insurers are no longer allowed to give a discount on collective health insurance.

Most insurance packages allow patients to choose where they want to be treated. To help patients choose, the Dutch government has set up websites where information is gathered (Zorginzicht) and disclosed (KiesBeter) about provider performance. Patients dissatisfied with their healthcare insurance can choose another insurance package at the end of each year (with few exceptions).

== Opting out ==
Specific minority groups in Dutch society, most notably certain branches of orthodox Calvinism and Evangelical Christian groups, refuse to have insurance for religious reasons. To take care of these religious principled objections, the Dutch system provides a special opt-out clause. The amount of money for health care that would be paid by an employer in payroll taxes is in those cases not used for redistribution by the government, but instead, after request to the tax authorities, credited to a private health care savings account. The individual can draw from this account for paying medical bills, however if the account is depleted, one has to find the money elsewhere. If the person dies and the account still contains a sum, that sum is included in the inheritance.

If a person with a private health savings account changes his or her mind and wants to get insurance, the tax authorities release the remaining sum in the health account into the common risk pool.

The set of rules around the opt-out clauses have been designed in such way that people who do not want to be insured can opt out but not engage in a free ride on the system. However, ultimately health care providers are obliged to provide acute health care irrespective of insurance or financial status.

== See also ==
- Farmacotherapeutisch Kompas
- Mantelzorg
