= Risk equalization =

Risk equalization is a way of equalizing the risk profiles of insurance members to avoid loading premiums on the insured to some predetermined extent.

In health insurance, it enables private health insurance to operate in some countries to be offered at a common rate for all even though insurers are not allowed by law to reject clients or impose special conditions for their health insurance. That is achieved by transfer payments by a risk equalization pool usually run by a neutral party, such as a government agency.

== Health care ==
In unregulated competitive markets for individual health insurance, risk-rated premiums are observed to differ across subgroups of insured people, which are defined by rating factors such as age, gender, family size, geographic area (because costs of care may be higher or lower in some coverage areas than others) occupation, length of contract period, the level of deductible, health status at time of enrollment, health habits (smoking, drinking, exercising) and, via differentiated bonuses for multiyear no-claim, to prior costs.

Some nations that encourage private insurance for health care still seek to prevent insurers from engaging in risk minimizing actions to load the premiums of people with certain high-risk profiles, typically the elderly, the sick, and to some extent, women. Thus, financial transfers are needed in order to prohibit any discriminatory practices against these subgroups without increasing costs on insurers. This is done by arranging for a third party to organize a regulatory system of risk-adjusted premium subsidies.

The financial transfers are then channeled via a so-called Subsidy Fund. In European countries such as the Netherlands, Belgium, Germany, and Switzerland, the Subsidy Fund is run by a government agency, which assesses risks for individual policy holders. In all countries that apply risk-adjusted premium subsidies in their health insurance market, the sponsor organizes it in the form of risk equalization among health insurers: the risk-adjusted premium subsidies for the insured are channelled to the insurers. Then, the Subsidy Fund is called a Risk Equalization Fund (REF). An insurer receives a relatively large sum of subsidies by the REF if the risk profile of their members is relatively unhealthy and vice versa.

Although premiums can be rated across many subgroups of insured people, a sponsor may not want to subsidize all observed premium rate variation, in practice. The total set of risk factors used by insurers to rate their premiums can be divided in two subsets: the subset of risk factors that cause premium rate variation that the sponsor decides to subsidize, the S(ubsidy)-type risk factors; and the subset that causes premium rate variations which the sponsor does not want to subsidize, the N(on-subsidy)-type risk factors.

Gender, health status and (to a certain extent) age will, in most countries, be considered S-type risk factors. Examples of potential N-type risk factors are a high propensity for medical consumption, living in a region with high prices and/or overcapacity resulting in supply-induced demand, or using providers with an inefficient practice-style. The sponsor determines the specific categorization of S-type and N-type risk factors. When the government takes up the role of the sponsor, this categorization is ultimately determined by value judgments in society. Because the premium subsidies are risk-based, price competition will not be distorted by these subsidies and therefore incentives for efficiency are not reduced.

That operates in countries such as Australia, Germany, the Netherlands, Belgium, Switzerland, and Ireland. The system of risk equalization plays a crucial role in order to reduce the incentives for risk selection in this new Dutch market of regulated competition. (See Health care in the Netherlands) Dutch insurers are not allowed to risk-rate their premiums. In practice, the sponsor often encounters difficulties to find adequate measures of the S-type risk factors (such as health status) to include in the risk equalization model.

The concept was put in the US healthcare law, passed in 2010, the Patient Protection and Affordable Care Act. To achieve its aims, state and federal regulators must construct an effective system of risk adjustment or risk equalization that protects health insurers that attract a disproportionate share of patients with poor health risks and punishes those that cherry pick lower risk groups.
