= Economy of Saba =

The economy of Saba, smallest island of the Netherlands, has always been limited by its small land mass (five square miles) and low population (currently about 1500 people). Because Saba is a dormant volcano with rocky shores and only one beach, tourism was slow to develop. However, the island has become known for its eco-tourist opportunities, such as scuba diving, rock climbing, and hiking. The tourism industry now contributes more to the island's economy than any other sector.

== Economic history ==
Possibly, Saba's first settlers were a group of Englishmen who shipwrecked on its coast in 1632. However, it is unknown if they remained on the island throughout this decade. Around 1640 Saba was settled by Dutch colonists from nearby St. Eustatius. As the century progressed, Saba became a regional haven for illicit trade. Agriculture, including sugar cane, cotton, tobacco, and indigo were important first industries, as well as fishing. The first enslaved Africans arrived on Saba by at least the 1650s, together with sugar production.

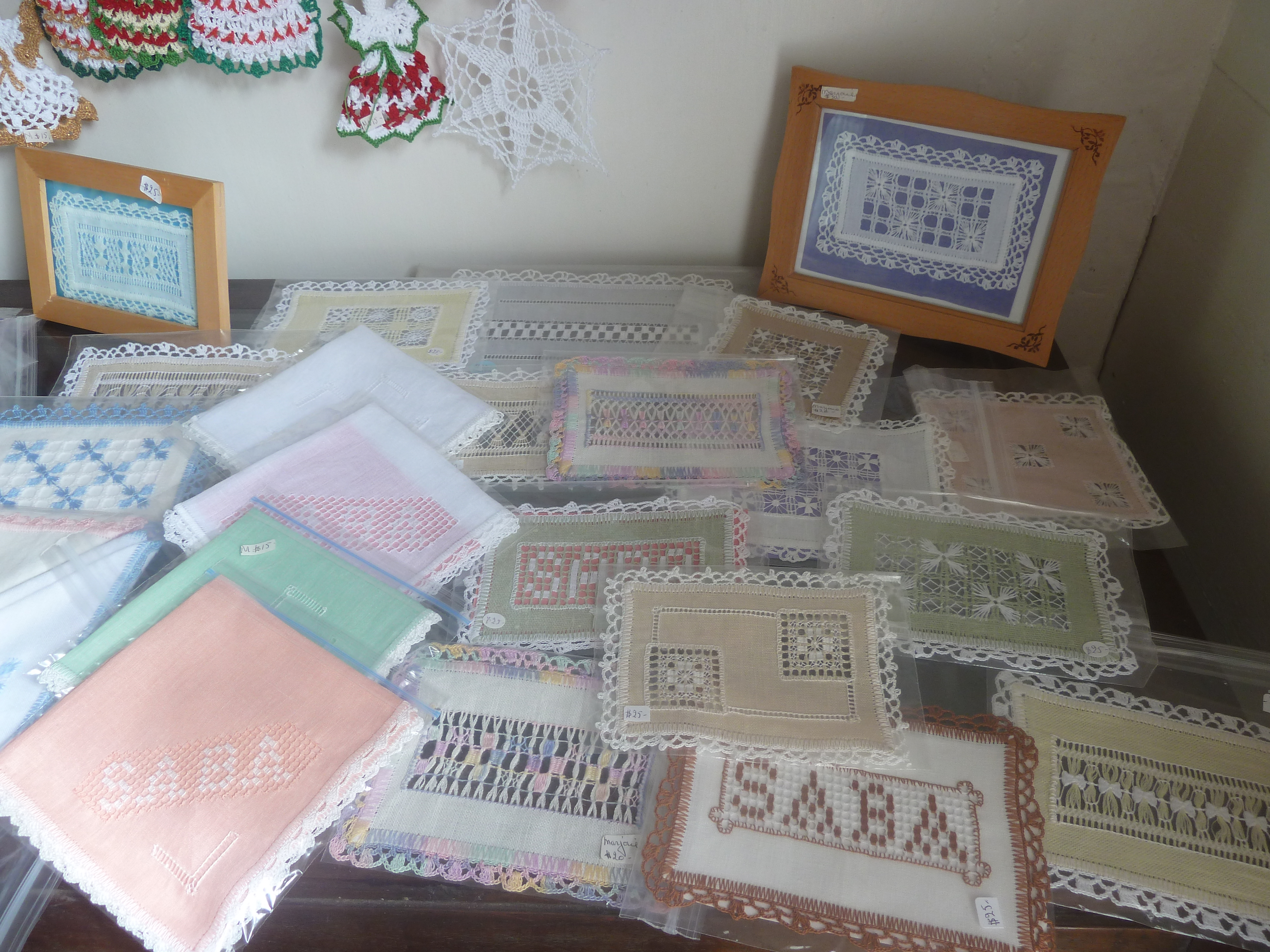
Saba Lace, Harry L Johnson Museum, Windwardside, Saba, Jan 2012.

Because many of Saba's men were gone at sea for extended periods, the island's women took up lace making in the late 19th century. When international mail service became available in 1884, women began selling Saba lace to American consumers by mail order. Saba Lace exports grew in importance over the subsequent decades, reaching sales of $15,000 (US) per year by 1928.

In the latter part of the 20th century, Saba began developing the infrastructure necessary to support tourism. The addition of Juancho E. Yrausquin Airport, built in 1963, made travel between Saba and other islands more accessible. Likewise, the 1972 construction of a pier in Fort Bay has enabled ferry service between Saba and Saint Martin, as well as docking of small cruise ships.

In 1987, Saba's coastline and surrounding waters were designated as the Saba National Marine Park. Because of regulations to help conserve the marine park's reefs and other aquatic life, it has remained a healthy, thriving ecosystem. Scuba divers became increasingly attracted to Saba, since its reefs have been spared the damage suffered by many reefs throughout the world.

== Current economy ==
Tourism has been steadily increasing in recent years. According to Saba's official tourist bureau, in the first quarter of 2005 tourist arrivals to Saba totaled 7,358. Current estimates place the number of yearly tourists at around 11,000. The largest number of tourists come from the United States, but more and more Dutch and other European travelers are making Saba a destination.

Agriculture still contributes to the economy, primarily livestock and vegetables, especially potatoes. Saba Lace continues to be sold at shops on the island. The Saba University School of Medicine has grown in importance as it has expanded, contributing about 200 jobs (directly and indirectly) and $4.8 million (US) to the GDP.

== Infrastructure ==
Due to its geographic isolation, rugged terrain, and small population, maintaining infrastructure on Saba is highly expensive. This is reflected in utility and telecommunications costs; for example, a 2026 global pricing study found that Saba had the most expensive mobile data of any territory or country in the world, with a median cost of $11.06 per gigabyte.

== Statistics ==
All the statistics in this section come from the Census Bureau of Statistics Netherlands Antilles.

=== Gross Domestic Product by sector, Saba (mln ANG) ===
Year	Government	Enterprises	GDP
1996	11.8	15.2	27.0
1997	16.4	15.4	31.8
1998	11.1	21.4	32.6
1999	11.2	22.0	33.2
2000	10.5	21.5	31.5
2001	9.5	22.6	32.1
2002	9.0	23.2	32.2
2003	8.8	24.8	33.6

=== Businesses per Industry ===
This information is according to the Business Census 1998. Due to the CSB's criteria for defining a business during this census, very small businesses were not counted. Certain other groups were excluded, such as small independent farmers and fishermen, market vendors, and independent taxi drivers. The census also does not include government departments and services or foundations completely subsidized by the government.

Industry	Businesses
Agriculture and mining	1
Manufacturing	2
Electricity, gas and water	1
Construction	3
Trade	24
Hotels and restaurants	20
Transport and communication	5
Financial services	5
Business services	2
Education	1
Health and social work	0
Other services	5
Total	69

== See also ==
- Culture of Saba
