= Family policy in the Netherlands =

Marriage legislation has a long tradition in the Netherlands. The minimum age at marriage was set in the 1811 Civil Code, amended in 1838. Same sex marriage was allowed in 2001. The first Family Allowance Act was introduced in 1941, and provided benefits only to working families with more than two children. In 1947, the income dependency was abolished and wage earners were also entitled to an allowance for their first and second children under 18 years old. In 1963, family allowances were extended to self-employed people. Currently, all families living in the Netherlands are entitled to a family allowance if their child (biological, adopted, step or foster) is younger than 18 years old. In 1956, the Netherlands passed the Nursery Education Act that funded preschool; however, in 1981, preschool was added to the standard education system. The Childcare Act of 2005 gave childcare an official framework which provided funding and supervision for many programs.

== Marriage ==
Marriage in the Netherlands has very few rules that have changed throughout history. The first rule was set in the 1811 Civil Code which stated that the groom must be at least 18 years of age and the bride must be at least 15 years of age. This was changed in 1838 when brides were made to be at least 16 years of age and grooms still 18. Recent additions to the Civil Code have changed the brides' age to 18, along with the grooms' age of 18.

These Civil Codes also added to the laws that in order to be married in the Netherlands, one partner must be Dutch or currently living in the Netherlands.

Along with this law was the provision of relatives marrying; however, it only applies to brother-sister, parent-child, and grandparent-grandchild.

Pre-2001, the Civil Code did not explicitly address same-sex marriage. In 2001, a law was created that allowed same-sex marriage in the Netherlands.

== Family provisions ==
In 1941, the Family Allowance Act was created in order to support families in hard times; however, this act only applied to working families with three or more children. This was because it was assumed that an average salary was enough to support a family with two children. In addition to this, the children had to be dependent on the parent and once the child turned 15, the benefits no longer applied.

In 1947, working families were allowed benefits from all children if they were under the age of 18 years old; in 1963, benefits were extended to self-employed families as well.

Family allowance is broken down based on the age of the child in euros per month (EpM): 0-6=191.65 EpM, 6-12=232.71 EpM, 12-18=273.78 EpM.

If a child is earning more than 1,266 euros per quarter or is receiving study benefits, the family can not receive benefits for them. Additionally, a family is only allowed benefits for 16 and 17-year-olds if they are actively participating in an education program to receive a VMBO, HAVO, or VWO.

These rules change slightly given different situations such as disability, single-parent families, and other special circumstances.

== Childcare ==
In 1956, the Netherlands passed the Nursery Education Act that funded preschool; however, in 1981, preschool was added to the standard education system. Four-year-olds were allowed to be enrolled in school but it was not mandatory; school became mandatory once the child reached five years old. If a child has the possibility of a language disadvantage, mainly for immigrant children, they can be enrolled as young as two years old in order to catch them up before primary school started.

Daycare and after-school care have policies dating back to the 1970s in the Netherlands. The recent increase in women in the workforce has called for an increase in the amount of daycare and after-school care needed. Today, the system is mixed of formal, informal, public, and private care. The Childcare Act of 2005 gave childcare an official framework and provided funding and supervision for many programs. In 2010, the act was amended and renamed to the "Childcare and Quality Standards for Playgroups Act". This new version of the act provided better supervision and funding while also regulating the quality of these daycare facilities and providing education for the children in these facilities.
