= Equalization pool =

Fund created for risk equalization

An equalization pool is a fund created to level out differences in financial risk, often across long periods of time, in a process known as risk equalization. Examples include mandatory health insurance and grower co-operatives.

== Health insurance ==
In health insurance, equalization pools are used in countries such as Ireland, Australia, Germany and the Netherlands, to balance risks in groups of people of varying levels of health to ensure medical risks are covered for people who might otherwise be difficult to insure. The policies are also called high-risk pools and are made for covering the sickest uninsured people. For insurance companies, giving service to those citizens is deeply risky, so the government gives them some money to reduce the cost.

In normal insurance markets, insurers price high-risk individuals at a higher premium to discourage them from buying insurance and offer lower-risk individuals lower premiums. That can make insurance phenomenally expensive for the elderly and those in poor health at a time that they can least afford to pay for insurance because they are not earning an income. Young people, on the other hand, for whom ill health is not a major concern, often do not buy health insurance even though it is relatively cheap for them to do so.

To overcome the problem, some governments have made basic health insurance compulsory and also created a risk equalization pool to even out differences in risks carried by insurance companies in the health market. Thus, the younger and healthier people must pay into the risk equalization pool, and the older and sicker people will receive money from the equalization pool. A government agency usually assigns the risks and manages the risk pool. Governments can then subsidize health care for the unemployed or the retired by the risk pool system. The presence of a risk equalization pool and a common health benefits system makes competition more transparent between health insurers and prevents them from behaving in ways that discourage the achievement of a universal health care system for the nation.

=== Ireland ===
Ireland's health insurance system was originally a state monopoly with premiums collected by Vhi Healthcare. The monopoly was later broken, and the British private health insurance company BUPA entered the Irish market and began competing with VHI, generally undercutting it by attracting mostly younger and healthier clients by offering them cheaper coverage. VHI complained bitterly because BUPA was effectively seen to be making an unacceptably-high amount of profits under the arrangements, saddling VHI with the cost of insuring the more high-risk end of the market. In 1999, private health insurance covered about 1.5 million people (42% of the population). To tackle the problem, on 1 July 2003, new risk equalization regulations came into force (SI No. 261 of 2003) with the aim to neutralize more equitably the differences in insurers costs from variations in the health status of their members. It introduced risk equalization transfers from insurers with low-risk profiles to insurers with high-risk profiles. Under the regulations, insurers covered by the scheme, both open insurers and the one restricted membership undertaking were required to submit biannual returns to The Health Insurance Authority, the independent statutory regulatory body for the industry, detailing the claims of their members. Under the system, if the market equalization percentage, the degree of difference between insurers' risk profiles, is less than 2%, the regulations specify that no risk equalization payments should be commenced. If it lies between 2% and 10%, the Authority must make a recommendation to the Minister for Health and Children as to whether or not payments should be commenced. If it is above 10%, the Minister is to sanction the commencement of payments unless, having consulted with the Authority, he determines that to do so would not be in the best overall interests of health insurance consumers.

In 2002, BUPA Ireland made a complaint to the European Commission, claiming that risk equalization constituted state aid, as transfers were likely to take place from BUPA Ireland to VHI Healthcare, and the latter is owned by the state. The Commission investigated and, in 2003, it determined that transfers under the equalization scheme did not constitute state aid. BUPA withdrew from the Irish health insurance market on 14 December 2006 by selling the Irish company to new owners. The company continued with its legal challenge on the issue of community rating and the application of the risk equalization levy. The Irish Supreme Court has since found for the Irish company, on the grounds that community rating is not the same as risk equalization, and the whole issue of VHI's predominantly-older clientele is now back in the hands of government, which has declared that it is not in a rush to move to propose new legislation.

=== Netherlands ===
Health care in the Netherlands has, since 2006, used a new system of health care that is based on a risk equalization model.

== Co-operative marketing ==
In co-operative marketing ventures with a near-monopoly power, especially of perishable goods such as milk or fruit, equalization pools are sometimes used to even out zither price fluctuations that might otherwise happen from season to season or from year to year.

== Regional balance ==
Some governments use equalization pools to achieve social balance so that the richer regions, with fewer needs for state aid, pay taxes into an equalization pool so that the poorer regions, needing financial assistance, are able to provide the same level of services.
