= Saba lace =

Handcrafted needlework art industry in Saba

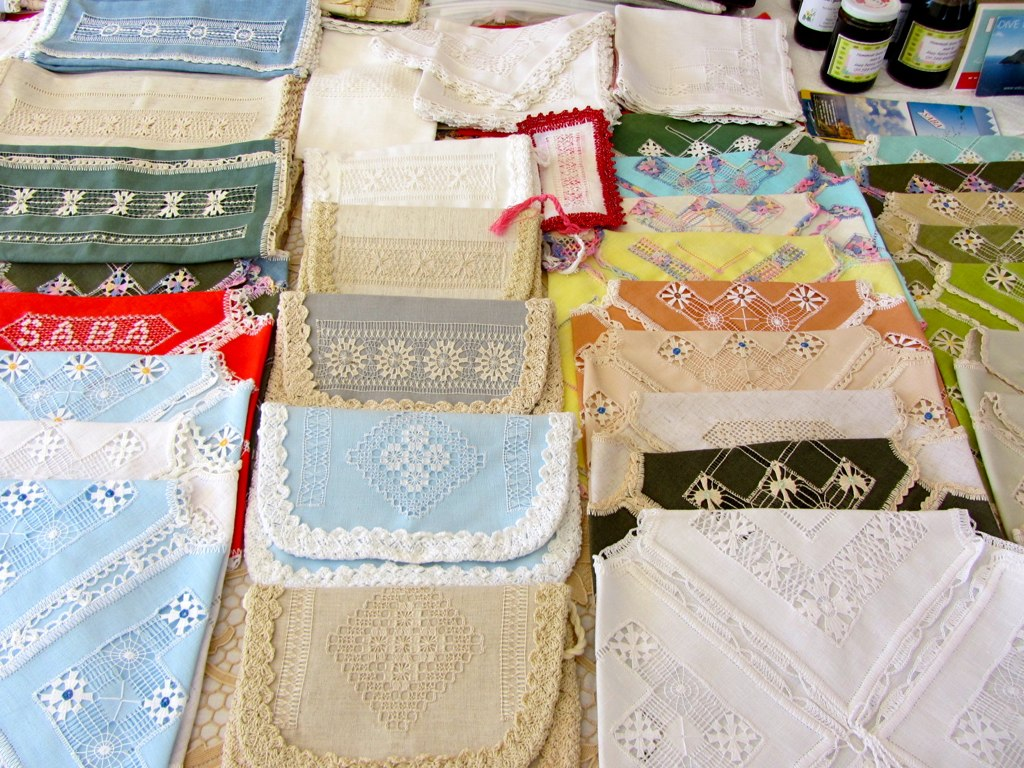
Saba lace works

Saba lace or Spanish Work, as it was known in the early period, is a handcrafted art of needlework designs which began as a cottage industry on the Caribbean island of Saba at the end of the 19th century and grew into one of the leading industries on the island at the turn of the 20th century. Until the 1950s, lacework was one of the key sources of revenue for the island's economy. The handicraft is still practiced and is a feature of tourism for the island, having been the focus of two books on the subject, as well as a winner of the Prince Bernhard Caribbean Culture Prize.

== History ==
With few educational opportunities available for women in the 19th century on Saba, Mary Gertrude (née Hassell) Johnson was sent to study at a Venezuelan Catholic convent and learned the intricate craft. She returned in the 1870s and taught others how to make the drawn-thread patterns, made by pulling and tying threads from cotton cloth into lacework designs. When mail service with the outside world was established in 1884, the women of Saba turned their craft into a mail-order industry. Without initial client lists, the women created their own, by writing letters to American companies each time merchandise from the United States was received on the island. By the era of World War I, when the island population was around 2,000 people, 250 women were working in the cottage lace craft. By 1928, Saba lace sales were garnering $15,000 annually from the U.S. alone and had an established reputation for fine craftsmanship. Through the 1950s, lacework was one of the leading sources of income for the economy.

== Cultural significance ==
In 1995, a graduate student from the University of Texas, Eric A. Eliason, came to Saba to research Saban nationalism for his graduate thesis. He recognized that for the women of the island, Saba lace was a large part of their cultural heritage and spoke to their ethic for hard work and passing on tradition. Urged by local women to document the craft, he gathered samples of the lace, making copies of the work on a photocopy machine made available by the tourism department. In 1997, he published The Fruit of Her Hands: Saba Lace, History & Patterns. Publication of the book revitalized both interest in the craft and a desire for preserving its heritage. Women began using the book to learn new patterns.

In 2010, with the help of students at Brigham Young University, Eliason prepared a second book, Saba Lace Patterns, which documents both the creators of designs themselves and their signature patterns. Throughout the island there are establishments which sell clothing and table linens which feature Saba lace, which has become an important cultural icon driving tourism. Means and ways to protect Saba lace has been part of consultations held by the Netherlands in their implementation of UNESCO's initiatives to protect and preserve iconic cultural treasures. In 2014, Saba lace and the "lace ladies" were awarded the Prince Bernhard Caribbean Culture Prize.
