= AWBZ =

Dutch healthcare law

The Algemene Wet Bijzondere Ziektekosten ("general law on exceptional medical expenses"), often known by the acronym AWBZ, was a Dutch health care law that first came into effect in 1968 and was repealed and replaced in 2015 by the Wet Langdurige Zorg ("long-term care act"). It aimed to provide general insurance covering the Dutch population against special health care needs. AWBZ was mainly aimed at financing 'care', as opposed to 'cure', which was mainly financed by insurers regulated by the Zorgverzekeringswet. It financed most of the healthcare expenditures.

It can cover:

- Nursing care such as medication and taking care of injuries.
- Personal Care such as help with the preparation of meals, dressing and undressing or showering.
- Assistance with activities such as managing money or other practical matters.
- Assistance in dealing with problems this includes guidance with problems of a psychological nature.
- Rehabilitation treatment
- Residential care
