= Doran Clark =

American actress (b. 1954)

- Born: August 8, 1954 (age 70); California, U.S.
- Education: Syracuse University (BA); Briarcliff College (BA)
- Years active: 1979–2000
- Spouse: Peter Abrams
- Children: 2
- Relatives: Louise Caire Clark (sister); Mark W. Clark (grandfather)

Doran Clark (born August 8, 1954) is an American actress.

== Early life and education ==
Clark was born to actress/model Audrey Caire and William Clark. She has two sisters and two brothers, including actress Louise Clark Goddard (of the Harry and Louise political commercials). She is the granddaughter of General Mark W. Clark. Clark graduated from Syracuse University with a degree in European history and later earned a Bachelor of Arts degree in performing arts from Briarcliff College.

== Career ==
Clark's film and television credits include Black Eagle (with Jean-Claude Van Damme and Sho Kosugi), Passport to Paris (with Mary-Kate and Ashley Olsen), numerous appearances on Perry Mason, Matlock, Jake and the Fatman, Trapper John, M.D., an appearance on an episode of MacGyver called "The Heist," several episodes of Murder, She Wrote, as well as many starring and supporting roles on sitcoms from the late 1970s through the 1990s.

She was known for her roles on three different primetime soaps: the short-lived (eight episodes) Secrets of Midland Heights as Ann Dulles; King's Crossing as Jillian Beauchamp; and Emerald Point N.A.S. as Ensign Leslie Mallory. She also played Charlene Chasen in the short-lived NBC-TV drama Nightingales.

== Filmography ==
=== Film ===
Year	Title	Role	Notes
1979	The Warriors	Lizzie	Film debut role
1988	Black Eagle	Patricia Parker	
1998	Denial	Vicki	Final film role

=== Television ===
Year	Title	Role	Notes
1979	Too Far to Go	Judith	Television film
1980	Quincy, M.E.	Ann Kaiser	Episode: "The Winning Edge"
1980; 1981	Secrets of Midland Heights	Ann Dulles	11 episodes
1981	Splendor in the Grass	Juanita Howard	Television film
1982	T. J. Hooker	Carol Bennett	Episode: "Terror at the Academy"
1982	King's Crossing	Jillian	10 episodes
1983	The Powers of Matthew Star	Caroline Ashley	Episode: "The Racer's Edge"
1983	Tucker's Witch	Elaine Miller / Beth Gorman	Episode: "Living and Presumed Dead"
1983	Prototype	Chris	Television film
1983; 1984	Emerald Point N.A.S.	Ensign Leslie Mallory	22 episodes
1984; 1992	Murder, She Wrote	Various roles	3 episodes
1985	Hell Town	Jennie	Episode: "Let My Jennie Go"
1985	Hollywood Beat	Carla	Episode: "No Place to Hide"
1985	MacGyver	Chris Rhodes	Episode: "The Heist"
1986	Hotel	Shawn Barrish	Episode: "Child's Play"
1986	Trapper John, M.D.	Dr. Mary Barnwell	Episode: "Judgement Day"
1986	Matlock	Cathy Baron	2 episodes
1987	The Law & Harry McGraw	Sandy Wylie	Episode: "Dead Men Don't Make Phone Calls"
1988	Perry Mason: The Case of the Lady in the Lake	Sara Wingate-Travis	Television film
1989	Nightingales	Dr. Charlene Chasen	6 episodes
1990	Father Dowling Mysteries	Lindsey Quinn	Episode: "The Murder Weekend Mystery"
1991	Quantum Leap	Laura	Episode: "Permanent Wave"
1991	Civil Wars	Rachel Tillson	Episode: "Daveja-Vu All Over Again"
1992	Stay the Night	Roxanne Kettman	Television film
1993	Matlock	Kathleen Shelton	Episode: "The Vacation"
1999	Chicago Hope	Melody, Cacaci's Ex-Wife #5	Episode: "Humpty Dumpty"
2000	Providence	Gail O'Malley	Episode: "Mother & Child"
