= Ben Goddard =

American political consultant (1942–2018)

- Born: October 17, 1942
- Died: June 15, 2018 (aged 75)
- Occupation: Political consultant
- Spouse(s): Louise Caire Clark (m. 19??)
- Relatives: Doran Clark (sister-in-law), Mark W. Clark (grandfather-in-law)

Ben Goddard (October 17, 1942 – June 15, 2018) was an American political consultant and founding partner of First Tuesday, Goddard Claussen, Goddard Global, and Goddard Gunster. He is widely regarded as the godfather of issue advocacy advertising and is credited with creating the genre of national issue advocacy advertising with the Harry & Louise campaign, paid for by private health insurance companies to help defeat the Clinton health care plan of 1993.

== Career and accomplishments ==
He was president of the International Association of Political Consultants, and was a featured columnist in The Hill newspaper, providing reviews and comments on campaign messages and strategies.

Notable Goddard campaigns include Harry & Louise, the Pacific Life Whales, and Prop 187 in California. According to the Goddard Gunster website, Goddard has received dozens of awards for creativity, including a television Emmy, and his commercials are part of the Smithsonian Institution permanent collection.

In the 1970s and 1980s Goddard served as a media consultant to candidates for state and national office including Jimmy Carter, Gary Hart, Mo Udall and Bruce Babbitt.

In addition to his work in the United States, Goddard also created the first political advertising in Russia to preserve Boris Yeltsin's free-market reforms.

Goddard married Louise Caire Clark, the actress who played Louise in his Harry & Louise ad campaign. He died on June 15, 2018, following "years of challenging and debilitating medical issues".
