= Patinkin =

Patinkin is a surname. Notable people bearing it include:

- Don Patinkin (1922–1995), Israeli-American economist and university president
- Sheldon Patinkin (1935–2014), American author and theatrical director
- Mandy Patinkin (born 1952), American actor and vocalist
- Mark Patinkin (fl. 2020), American reporter
