= Ira Magaziner =

American political advisor

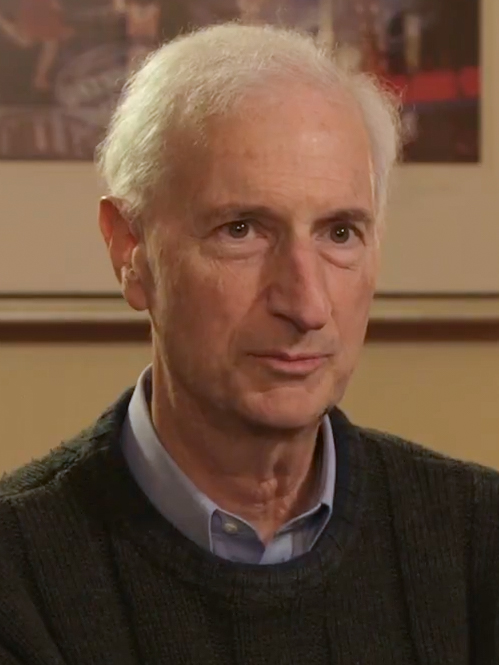
- Magaziner in 2011
- Born: November 8, 1947 (age 78); New York City, U.S.
- Education: Brown University (BA); Balliol College, Oxford
- Known for: CEO of Clinton Health Access Initiative
- Children: 3, including Seth

Ira Magaziner (born November 8, 1947) is an American political advisor. He was born in New York City, U.S. After being a student activist and business consultant, Magaziner became the senior advisor for policy development for President Clinton, especially as chief healthcare policy advisor. He now serves in a leadership capacity for two of the Clinton Foundation's international development initiatives, which are at the forefront of non-governmental organizations in addressing global health and environmental issues.

== Education ==
While a student at Brown University, Magaziner was one of the two architects of the "New Curriculum", a liberal academic approach which eliminated core requirements outside of the concentration the student pursues, encouraged interdisciplinary study, and made grades optional in many cases. He was also president of the Undergraduate Council of Students, where he negotiated with university administration after the 1968 black student walkout. Magaziner graduated from Brown in 1969 as the valedictorian of his class. His valedictory address, which focused on social justice, was featured in a 1969 Life magazine special on student leaders. After his address, Magaziner led the students in turning their backs on Henry Kissinger, who was receiving an honorary degree.

After graduating from Brown, Magaziner enrolled at Balliol College at the University of Oxford as a Rhodes Scholar, where he studied political philosophy and economics under Isaiah Berlin. While at Oxford, he befriended Clinton, who was also a Rhodes Scholar at the time. Magaziner disliked the stuffy Oxford campus and rented an apartment in London, where he organized protest rallies against the Vietnam War and studied political economy at the London School of Economics.

After Oxford, Magaziner and a group of former Brown students attempted to implement social democratic reforms in the city of Brockton, Massachusetts, before abandoning the efforts after realizing that the town's industrial decline was due to external economic forces.

== Career ==
In 1973, Magaziner joined Boston Consulting Group, working in Boston, London and Tokyo before departing in 1979. He founded Telesis in 1979, sold the company in 1986 to Towers Perrin Inc. and managed the US strategy practice for Towers Perrin from 1986 to 1989. Throughout his consulting career, Magaziner's client list has included General Electric, Corning Glass, the Governments of Ireland and Sweden and other high-tech manufacturing and health care companies.

Magaziner also has had significant influence in Rhode Island. Working alongside Governor J. Joseph Garrahy, he devised a state economic plan, known as the "Greenhouse Compact", which, upon approval by the voters, aimed to resolve several key economic issues in the state, to create several business "incubators", and to stimulate state exports. While initially popular among state legislators, and some civic and business leaders, it was ultimately voted down by referendum. Magaziner and his family continue to support prominent Democratic Rhode Island politicians and other social causes, including the Rhode Island Food Bank.

Magaziner has authored two books on business strategy and industrial policy: Minding America's Business and The Silent War. The former, co-authored with future Clinton Secretary of Labor Robert Reich, laid out a plan for US industrial policy in the late 1970s and early 1980s, and received critical acclaim. Emphasis was placed on eliminating subsidies for inefficient American industries, and applying fiscal and industrial policy strategies to stimulate growth in sectors for which the US had "cost-advantage." The Silent War, co-authored with Providence Journal columnist Mark Patinkin, tells the story of international business competition in the early 1990s, and Magaziner's experiences in dealing with different countries' relationships to their corporate base.

=== Clinton Administration ===
Magaziner is best known for leading, along with Hillary Clinton, the failed Task Force to Reform Health Care in the early Clinton administration, which aimed to implement a managed competition regime for the health insurance industry, and to establish community rated insurance pools to cut costs for small businesses and the uninsured. The plan was widely criticized for being too complex. Pharmaceutical companies and health insurance companies waged a broad-based ad-campaign against the plan, which included the famous "Harry and Louise" ads. Despite the attacks by Republicans and industry associations, Magaziner did little to respond. People within the administration criticized Magaziner's blunt and domineering approach, attacking critics who disagreed instead of trying to build consensus.

Brad DeLong, Clinton's Deputy Treasury Secretary, argues that Magaziner's failures stemmed from having a background in management consulting instead of policy: "A management consultant's principal goal is to win a debate in front of his employer ... by making intellectual arguments, controlling the flow of information..., [and] walling-off potential adversaries from the process ... You develop a policy by forming a large coalition ... Then you have a large group of people who are enthusiastic about the proposal: they will go out and make your arguments for you."

Magaziner was court ordered to pay $285,864 to the Association of American Physicians and Surgeons, in 1997 by a federal judge for alleged cover up of whether the Task Force to Reform Health Care hired non-governmental employees and therefore had to release documents from their strategic deliberations upon public request. Magaziner was subsequently cleared of all allegations and the fine was overturned by unanimous decision of the United States Court of Appeals on August 25, 1999.

Magaziner stayed in the administration and worked to develop an E-Commerce policy initiative with OSTP staff and industry advisors. That initiative evolved to include a facilitative role in the formation of the Internet Corporation for Assigned Names and Numbers to assume Internet administrative activities previously maintained by the US DARPA.

=== Clinton Health Access Initiative ===
Since 2002, Magaziner is the chief executive officer and vice chairman of the Clinton Health Access Initiative (CHAI), which works to save lives in low and middle income countries by helping people gain access to essential medicines and health services.

== Personal life ==
Magaziner lives in Bristol, Rhode Island, with his wife Suzanne. They have three children, including Seth Magaziner, who has served as the U.S. representative for Rhode Island's 2nd congressional district since January 2023.

Magaziner repeatedly flew on Jeffrey Epstein's jets and his personal phone number and private email were in Epstein's "black book."
