= Charles Kahn =

Charles Kahn could refer to:

- Charles H. Kahn, American classicist and academic
- Charles N. Kahn III (born 1952), president and chief executive officer of the Federation of American Hospitals
