= Secrets of Midland Heights =

American TV soap opera (Dec 1980)

- Country of origin: United States
- Original language: English
- No. of seasons: 1
- No. of episodes: 8 (+ 3 unaired)

Production
- Running time: 60 minutes
- Production company: Lorimar Productions

Original release
- Network: CBS
- Release: December 6, 1980 – January 24, 1981

Martha Scott, Jordan Christopher (foreground); Lorenzo Lamas, Linda Hamilton, Jim Youngs, Doran Clark, Daniel Zippi (second row)

Secrets of Midland Heights is an American nighttime soap opera produced by Lorimar Productions after the success of Dallas. It ran on CBS from December 6, 1980, to January 24, 1981, for eight episodes, with three episodes left unaired.

== Series overview ==
Secrets of Midland Heights was aimed at the teen audience, and featured romantic triangles and secrets among the teens and their parents who populated a fictional midwestern college town called Midland Heights. Aired on Saturday night at 10 pm EST/9 pm Central, the series never found an audience and was canceled after eight episodes.

The show resembled a dark, 1980s-style Peyton Place, both dealing with hidden secrets and scandalous affairs in a small town. Lisa Rogers (Linda Hamilton) juggled relationships with both college jock Burt Carroll (Lorenzo Lamas) and fratboy Mark Hudson (Bill Thornbury, in a recurring role), good girl heiress Ann Dulles (Doran Clark) secretly dated high school dropout John Grey (Jim Youngs), Holly Wheeler (played by Linda Grovenor in the pilot, and subsequently by Marilyn Jones) wanted to lose her virginity to her boyfriend Teddy Welsh (Daniel Zippi), but the teens were shocked to discover her mother Dorothy (Bibi Besch) was having an affair with Teddy's father Nathan (Robert Hogan), a widowed professor at the college.

There were also power struggles between the wealthy Millington family, one of Midland Heights' founding families, consisting of the widowed Margaret and her son Guy, and the equally wealthy and powerful Wheelers.

The show was produced by David Jacobs, Lee Rich and Michael Filerman, all of whom worked on other serial dramas like Flamingo Road and Knots Landing. When Secrets of Midland Heights was pulled from the schedule, the producers stated that the show would be retooled and make a return in some form. Many of the same performers and production staff returned to ABC the following season in the different serial King's Crossing, which similarly had a short run. After the demise of the series, actor Lorenzo Lamas would join the cast of the soap Falcon Crest.

== Cast and characters ==
- Bibi Besch as Dorothy Wheeler
- Jordan Christopher as Guy Millington
- Robert Hogan as Nathan Welsh
- William Jordan as Martin Wheeler
- Mark Pinter as Calvin Richardson
- Linda Grovenor (pilot only) & Marilyn Jones as Holly Wheeler
- Daniel Zippi as Teddy Welsh
- Doran Clark as Ann Dulles
- Jim Youngs as John Gray
- Linda Hamilton as Lisa Rogers
- Lorenzo Lamas as Burt Carroll
- Stephen Manley as Danny Welsh
- Melora Hardin as Micki Carroll
- Martha Scott as Margaret Millington

== Episodes ==
No.	Title	Directed by	Written by	Original release date	Viewers (millions)
1	"Founder's Day"	Robert Lewis	David Jacobs	December 6, 1980	11.8
2	"Decisions"	Gabrielle Beaumont	Story by : Caroline Elias; Teleplay by : Caroline Elias & Frederic Hunter	December 13, 1980	15.1
3	"The Searchers"	Fernando Lamas	David Jacobs	December 20, 1980	9.8
4	"Hooverville"	Alexander Singer	Elizabeth Quicksilver	December 26, 1980	22.2
Normally aired on Saturdays, this Friday night airing of the show (following a repeat episode of the top 5 hit The Dukes of Hazzard) was the series highest-rated episode by a very wide margin.
5	"Letting Go"	Rick Rosenthal	Margaret Schibi	January 3, 1981	11.2
6	"The Race"	Fernando Lamas	Story by : Will Manus; Teleplay by : Will Manus & Linda Elstad	January 10, 1981	10.4
7	"The Birthday Party"	Jeff Bleckner	Elizabeth Clark	January 17, 1981	9.7
8	"Facing Facts"	Nick Sgarro	Jack Turley	January 24, 1981	10.7
9	"Reunion of Strangers"	Carl Kiegel	Story by : Naomi Foner; Teleplay by : Naomi Foner & Nancy Ann Miller	unaired	unaired
10	"Heritage of Sorrows"	Gabrielle Beaumont	Mitzi Marvin	unaired	unaired
11	"Friends and Lovers"	unknown	Elizabeth Quicksilver	unaired	unaired
