= Cracked Up =

- Genre: Drama
- Written by: Peter Lefcourt
- Directed by: Karen Arthur
- Starring: Edward Asner; Raphael Sbarge; James Wilder
- Music by: Mark Snow
- Country of origin: United States
- Original language: English

Production
- Executive producers: Aaron Spelling; Douglas S. Cramer; Esther Shapiro
- Producer: Peter Lefcourt
- Cinematography: Tom Neuwirth
- Editor: Geoffrey Rowland
- Running time: 100 min.
- Production company: Aaron Spelling Productions

Original release
- Network: ABC
- Release: May 26, 1987

Cracked Up is a 1987 American TV film starring Ed Asner.

It was one of the first films about the crack cocaine epidemic.

== Cast ==
- Edward Asner as Vincent Owens
- Raphael Sbarge as Chris Mcnally
- James Wilder as John Owens
- Marilyn Jones as Terri Sandusky
- Richard Holden as Ed Sandusky
- Kim Delaney as Jackie
- H. Richard Greene as Coach Frank Malvin
- F J O'Neil as Dr Carl Eckhart
- Terence Alexander as Wilbert Fletcher

== Production ==
In 1986 a special aired on American TV called 48 Hours on Crack Street. A few weeks later, in October, Aaron Spelling Productions approached writer-producer Peter Lefcourt to make a crack-related projected. "They wanted it to be the first crack movie on," Lefcourt said. "Crack is hot."

The first draft was delivered in January 1987. Filming started on 9 March and the show aired in May.

"I didn't want to make another 48 Hours on Crack Street," said Lefcourt. "Movies have been made about cocaine, and they are so predictable. After a while, the audience's eyes glaze over. They know the kids are going to get screwed up and their parents are going to tear their hair out."

"We hope we've addressed this realistically," said director Karen Arthur. "We want to appeal to the youth audience and hope that through this film, kids who are contemplating putting this stuff in their throats, or have, will gain some courage not to, or to stop."
