= 11th Victim =

1979 American television film

- Print ad for the film
- Written by: Ken Friedman
- Directed by: Jonathan Kaplan
- Starring: Bess Armstrong; Max Gail
- Music by: Michel Colombier
- Country of origin: United States
- Original language: English

Production
- Producers: Marty Katz; Jonathan Haze
- Cinematography: Chuck Arnold
- Editor: O. Nicholas Brown
- Running time: 119 minutes
- Production company: Paramount Television

Original release
- Network: CBS
- Release: November 6, 1979

11th Victim is a 1979 American made-for-television crime drama film directed by Jonathan Kaplan and starring Bess Armstrong and Max Gail.

The film was based partially on the activities of the Los Angeles Hillside Strangler and was subsequently released on home video under the title The Lakeside Killer. Harry Northup, Harold Gould, and David Hayward round out the supporting cast of the movie. The film was broadcast as a November Sweeps CBS Tuesday Night Movie.

Director Jonathan Kaplan went on to critical acclaim as a director of feature films including The Accused (1988), Unlawful Entry (1992), Love Field (1992), and Brokedown Palace (1999).

== Plot ==
Jill Kelso (Bess Armstrong) is a Des Moines, Iowa television news anchor, whose younger sister, an aspiring actress, has entered a life of prostitution in Los Angeles. When the sister becomes the eleventh victim of a sex murderer, Kelso conducts her own undercover investigation into Hollywood's night world of commercial sex. Along the way, chemistry develops with a sympathetic cop (Max Gail) who tries to save her from becoming a victim herself.

== Cast ==
- Bess Armstrong as Jill Kelso
- Max Gail as Andrew Spencer
- David Hayward as "Red" Brody
- Harold Gould as Benny Benito
- Pamela Ludwig as Sally Taylor
- Harry Northup as Officer Thorpe
- Eric Burdon as "Spider"
- Annazette Chase as Cathy Cronenberger
- John Hancock as Captain Long
- Dick Miller as Ned, Investigator
- Marilyn Jones as Cindy Lee
- Michael Cavanaugh as Steve Rish
- Alfred Dennis as Ed Little
- Tara Strohmeier as Janie
- Michelle Downey as Amy Black
- Vicki Le Mere as Katy
- William H. Burton as The Suspect
- Ines Pedroza as Wilma Smith

== Production ==
It was the first telemovie for Kaplan after a series of features, the last two of which flopped. "I was told not to do it," he said. "I was told I would never work again in features. But I had to make a living.... In television you are an employee, much more than you are executing your vision. You get there when the script is done and maybe even when several parts are cast, and you get maybe two weeks to cut - so you can’t expect to have the [same] personal influence over what’s going on"
