= The Scenic Route =

1978 film by Mark Rappaport

- Directed by: Mark Rappaport
- Written by: Mark Rappaport
- Produced by: Mark Rappaport; Elaine Sperber
- Starring: Randy Danson; Marilyn Jones; Kevin Wade
- Cinematography: Fred Murphy
- Edited by: Mark Rappaport
- Distributed by: New Line Cinema
- Release date: April 15, 1978
- Running time: 76 mins
- Country: United States
- Language: English

The Scenic Route is a 1978 American drama film written and directed by Mark Rappaport and starring Randy Danson, Marilyn Jones and Kevin Wade.

== Plot ==
Estelle is living in New York and recovering from a bad relationship. She meets Paul and begins dating him, before he stops calling her one day. Shortly after, Estelle's sister Lena comes to stay. Lena brings home Paul, leading to a confusing love triangle.

== Reception and legacy ==
Roger Ebert gave the film a positive review, saying "It's a movie of great, grave, tightly controlled visual daring, and you have never seen anything like it before." Vincent Canby of The New York Times disliked it and wrote, "Mr. Rappaport's film-making manners are quite as foolish and empty-headed as his characters' affectations." In 1998, Jonathan Rosenbaum of the Chicago Reader included the film in his unranked list of the best American films not included on the AFI Top 100.
