= King's Crossing =

Television series

- Genre: Soap opera
- Created by: Sally Robinson
- Starring: Michael Zaslow; Linda Hamilton; Mary Frann; Bradford Dillman
- Composer: Jerrold Immel
- Country of origin: United States
- Original language: English
- No. of seasons: 1
- No. of episodes: 10 (3 unaired)

Production
- Running time: 60 minutes
- Production companies: MF Productions; Lorimar Productions

Original release
- Network: ABC
- Release: January 16 – February 27, 1982

King's Crossing is an American nighttime soap opera which aired on ABC from January 16 to February 27, 1982 for seven episodes.

The show was originally conceived by Lorimar Productions as a retooling of the cancelled CBS drama Secrets of Midland Heights, however it ended up completely unrelated from its predecessor, with only Linda Hamilton, Doran Clark, Marilyn Jones and Daniel Zippi returning as completely different characters.

== Series overview ==
The show centered on the Hollister family, who had returned to the small town of King's Crossing, California, which they had left ten years earlier. The family consisted of Paul (Bradford Dillman), a recovering alcoholic hoping for a fresh start as an English professor at the town's college, his long-suffering wife Nan (Mary Frann), their two daughters, Carey (Jones), who becomes involved with stablehand Billy (Zippi), and Lauren (Hamilton), an aspiring pianist who falls in love with her piano teacher, symphony conductor Jonathan Hadary (Michael Zaslow).

Nan is trying re-establish a connection with her cold and distant Aunt Louisa Beauchamp (Beatrice Straight), who had never approved of Paul and resents Nan's attempts to reclaim the family home. Willa (Dorothy Meyer) is Louisa's black housekeeper, and Jillian (Clark) was Carey and Lauren's crippled and disturbed cousin who is discovered by Carey hidden away in family's attic. Louisa's attempts to hide family secrets and the true story behind Jillian's accident were not revealed before the show was canceled, however it strongly resembled the storyline involving Angela and Emma Channing on the other Lorimar production Falcon Crest, which aired at the same time on CBS.

== Cast and characters ==
- Bradford Dillman as Paul Hollister
- Mary Frann as Nan Hollister
- Linda Hamilton as Lauren Hollister
- Doran Clark as Jillian Beauchamp
- Marilyn Jones as Carey Hollister
- Daniel Zippi as Billy McCall
- Dorothy Meyer as Willa Bristol
- and Beatrice Straight as Louisa Beauchamp

== Episodes ==
No.	Title	Directed by	Written by	Original release date	Viewers (millions)
1	"Keepers of the Ring"	Jack Bleckner	Sally Robinson	January 16, 1982	17.1
2	"Chapter One: Friday's Child"	Jeff Bleckner & Nick Havinga	Sally Robinson	January 23, 1982	12.3
3	"Chapter Two: Ghosts"	Larry Elikann & Nick Havinga	Paul Schneider & Margaret Schneider	January 30, 1982	12.9
4	"Triangle"	Paul Stanley	Rena Down	February 6, 1982	10.2
5	"Long Ago Tomorrow"	Victor Lobl	E.L. Comici	February 13, 1982	13.5
6	"Confusion by Cupid"	Jack Bender	Story by : Cory Applebaum; Teleplay by : Mitzi Marvin	February 20, 1982	11.4
7	"The Home Front"	Gwen Arner	Gina Goldman	February 27, 1982	13.4
8	"Family Reunion"	Ray Austin	Robert Benedetto, Judy Merl & Paul Eric Myers	unaired	unaired
9	"Strangers"	Jack Bender	M. & M. Robinson	unaired	unaired
10	"One Afternoon"	Ray Austin	Robert Presnell & Peggi Schibi	unaired	unaired
