= Health Security Express =

Bus caravan that promoted health care reform in the United States

The Health Security Express was a 1994 series of 16 buses that traveled around the United States in groups to promote a 1993 plan for health care reform backed by Bill Clinton. Then-U.S. President Clinton campaigned on a bus alongside his wife Hillary, Vice President Al Gore, and Tipper Gore. The caravan was organized by health care reform supporters and various labor unions, who sponsored the buses at $20,000 each and were required to support health care reform legislation. The Health Security Express was announced by Clinton health care supporters on July 12, 1994 and coordinated by John H. Hoyt, a Democratic activist. The Health Security Express had a budget of $1.4 million to $1.9 million and was funded by donations ranging from $3,000 to over $100,000.

== Events ==
Some riders joined the Health Security Express along the way, while others joined because they had "personal and professional stories of health care difficulties." During the national tour, some passengers, or "reform riders," told of their experiences with the U.S. health care system. Other events during rallies included music by Willie Nelson, speeches by Clinton himself, and the collecting of letters written by citizens supporting Clinton's reform plan.

During one stop in Independence, Missouri, Clinton spoke about universal health care proponent Harry Truman, an Independence native. Both supporters and opponents of Clinton's plan turned out, which he said was reminiscent of protests he encountered in an earlier 1992 bus campaign. The Health Security Express was often met with opposition by pro-life advocates, who did not want health care reform to support abortions, and conservative groups against increased government presence, including the National Taxpayers Union. Health care reform supporters disregarded the protests, focusing instead on the riders' stories. The tour fell apart when Citizens for A Sound Economy's Texas chapter turned out hundreds of protesters who greeted the bus when it arrived in Dallas. CSE had an old school bus with signs reading "HillaryCare Will Break HealthCare" which circled the event site. Hillary Clinton was on the bus and went into the meeting hall and met with a small group of people, canceling the public event. The Health Security Express bus went on to Oklahoma, with the school bus following it to the Texas border. That event marked the end of the bus tour, and essentially the end of the Clinton health care initiative.

== Organization ==
The Health Security Express actually comprised several groups of buses that departed from different regions: Boston, Massachusetts; Dallas, Texas; Independence, Missouri; New Orleans, Louisiana; and Portland, Oregon. The caravan from Portland departed on July 22, carried around 90 passengers, and was scheduled to pass through Missouri, Indiana, Kentucky, West Virginia, Pennsylvania, and Maryland, before meeting the other buses in Washington, D.C., on August 3. Timing their arrival to the Congressional debate over Clinton's 1993 plan, the bus riders planned to bring out the letters amassed throughout the trip in D.C. Upon reaching their destination, the nearly 1,000 riders from 16 buses congregated on the South Lawn of the White House and heard three of the passengers recount their experiences with the health care system.

== Response ==
The campaign started off slow, drawing little support while seeing protesters, and forcing organizers to ask members of the Cabinet to speak at stops. In addition, the Express experienced technical issues, including an overheating bus. The Clinton administration had hoped the caravans would be as effective as a six-day July 1992 bus tour during Clinton's presidential campaign. However, Tony Blankley said, "Public sentiment has crystallized against the Clinton health plan, and a bus tour won't change that." At some stops, more protesters than supporters turned out to meet the buses.

The largely negative public response to Clinton's initiatives has been compared to the Tea Party movement's response to U.S. President Barack Obama's efforts to enact Health care reform in the United States. Obama has used strategies similar to those used during the Health Security Express, such as reporting the stories of individual citizens, but the Patient Protection and Affordable Care Act was successful compared to Clinton's 1993 plan.
