= Louise Caire Clark =

American actress

- Spouse(s): Ben Goddard (m. 1997; died 2018)
- Children: 2

Louise Caire Clark is a retired American actress.

== Life and career ==
Louise Caire Clark is the daughter of William D. Clark and Audrey Caire. She participated in theatricial productions while attending Bradford Junior College and Briarcliff College. In 1969 she was chosen to be trained in theatrical arts at the Neighborhood Playhouse School of the Theatre in New York.

In the early 1980s Clark portrayed Maggie Scott in Five Mile Creek, the Disney Channel's first dramatic series.

Clark finished college in 1993 as a single mother who worked to support herself and her two children.

In 1997 Clark married Ben Goddard, who wrote and produced the "Harry and Louise" advertisements, in which she played Louise, paid for by private health insurance companies to help defeat the Clinton health care plan of 1993. In private life, Clark was "a great fan of socialized medicine" who participated in door-to-door campaigning for Bill Clinton in 1992.

In 2000, Clark and Goddard produced the movie The Testimony of Taliesin Jones. Goddard died June 15, 2018.

The Harry and Louise commercials undermined Clark's ability to make other commercials. The two actors were reunited in 2009 to make a new set of commercials in support of President Obama's plan for healthcare.

== Filmography ==
Actress

- Get Christie Love! (1974) TV - 1 episode (Karen Clark)
- The Catamount Killing (1974) (Iris Loring)
- Helter Skelter (1976) TV - 1 episode (Susan Struthers)
- She's Dressed to Kill (1979) TV
- Five Mile Creek (1983–1985) TV - 39 Episodes, 3 Seasons (Maggie Scott)
- Hardcastle and McCormick (1985) TV - Season 3, Episode 12
- Cobra (1986) (Woman in car)
- Matlock (1987) TV - 1 episode (Jesse Peters)
- Stingray (1987) TV - 1 episode (Mother)
- Programmed to Kill (1987) film (Sharon - A.K.A. "The Retaliator")
- Head of the Class (1990) TV - 1 episode (Joanna)
- Allie & Me (1997) (Karen Schneider)
- Of Things Past (2023) (Laura Dietrich)

Producer

- The Testimony of Taliesin Jones (2000) film
