= Marilyn Jones (actress) =

American actress

- Born: Grosse Pointe, Michigan, U.S.
- Occupation: Actress
- Years active: 1968–1994

Marilyn Jones is an American former actress, who made more than 50 film and television appearances during 1970s and 1980s.

== Life and career ==
Jones was born and raised in Grosse Pointe, Michigan and graduated from high school in Michigan. Jones later attended Miami University in Ohio and graduated from the University of Colorado with a humanities degree. She began her career with bit parts in films Speedway (1968), Support Your Local Sheriff! (1969) and Breezy (1973) and The Love Butcher (1975). In 1978 she played the leading role in the drama film, The Scenic Route. Jones later signed 30-appearances deal with Columbia Pictures' Talent and Development Workshop.

In 1979, Jones made her television debut in an episode of M*A*S*H and later made guest-starring appearances on B.J. and the Bear, Lou Grant and The White Shadow. From 1980 to 1981 she was a regular cast member on the short-lived CBS primetime soap opera, Secrets of Midland Heights. In 1982 she starred in another short-lived primetime soap, King's Crossing on ABC. Her feature film credits include The Hunter (1980), Chain Letters (1985), The Men's Club (1986), and the leading role in On the Block (1990). She also appeared in a number of made-for-television movies include 11th Victim (1979), I, Desire (1982), Do You Remember Love (1985), Cracked Up (1987), Perry Mason: The Case of the Silenced Singer (1990) and Coopersmith (1992).

Jones made more than 40 guest-starring appearances on television series including Remington Steele, Hill Street Blues, The Paper Chase, Hardcastle and McCormick, Magnum, P.I., V, Tales from the Darkside, The Twilight Zone, St. Elsewhere, MacGyver, Moonlighting, The Golden Girls, The Law & Harry McGraw, Highway to Heaven, Quantum Leap, Matlock and Murder, She Wrote.
