= Federation of American Hospitals =

US trade association for for-profit hospitals

- Nickname: FAH
- Formation: January 1, 1966; 60 years ago
- Type: 501c trade association
- Registration no.: 13-6226549
- Headquarters: Washington, D.C., U.S.
- Location: 750 9th Street, NW, Suite 600, Washington, DC 20001-4524
- President and CEO: Charles "Chip" N. Kahn, III (since June 2001)
- Website: fah.org

The Federation of American Hospitals is a trade association for for-profit hospitals in the United States. It is based in Washington D.C. Since 2001, the association has been led by Charles N. Kahn III.
