= Emerald Point N.A.S. =

American television soap opera (1983–1984)

- Genre: Soap opera
- Created by: Richard and Esther Shapiro
- Theme music composer: Bill Conti
- Country of origin: United States
- Original language: English
- No. of seasons: 1
- No. of episodes: 22

Production
- Running time: 60 minutes
- Production companies: Richard & Esther Shapiro Productions; 20th Century Fox Television

Original release
- Network: CBS
- Release: September 26, 1983 – March 12, 1984

Emerald Point N.A.S. is an American primetime soap opera created by Dynasty's Richard and Esther Shapiro which premiered on CBS on Monday, September 26, 1983. The series revolved around the lives of personnel stationed on a naval air station somewhere in Southern California, and combined military and espionage-based storylines with romance and family intrigue.

Its theme song was composed by Bill Conti, who had previously written the music for other primetime soaps such as Dynasty and Falcon Crest. Emerald Point N.A.S. was cancelled after 22 weeks, with its final episode airing March 12, 1984.

== Cast and characters ==
- Dennis Weaver as Rear Admiral Thomas Mallory
- Maud Adams as Maggie Farrell
- Jill St. John as Deanna Kincaid (ep. 4+)
- Andrew Stevens as Lt. Glenn Matthews
- Charles Frank as Lt. Cmdr. Jack Warren
- Richard Dean Anderson as Lt. Simon Adams
- Sela Ward as Hilary Adams
- Doran Clark as Ensign Leslie Mallory
- Stephanie Dunnam as Kay Mallory Matthews
- Susan Dey as Celia Mallory Warren
- Patrick O'Neal (eps. 1–9) and Robert Vaughn (ep. 10+) as Harlan Adams

Rear Admiral Thomas Mallory, a military hero and the commanding officer of the Emerald Point N.A.S., is the show's central character. He is a widower and father to three daughters, Celia Warren (Susan Dey), who is unhappy married to JAG lawyer Jack Warren (Charles Frank), Kay (Stephanie Dunnam), who is involved in a love triangle with Lieutenant Glenn Matthews (Andrew Stevens) and his scheming fiancée Hilary Adams (Sela Ward), and Leslie (Doran Clark), a recent graduate of the United States Naval Academy in Annapolis and the first female of the family to serve in the U.S. Navy.

Thomas enters a relationship with Maggie Farrell (Maud Adams), a representative on the Military Affairs Council of the Chamber of Commerce, and a Navy wife whose husband has been missing in action for over ten years. Other main characters include Lieutenant Simon Adams (Richard Dean Anderson), Hilary's brother, who eventually marries Celia after her divorce from Jack, villainous industrialist Harlan Adams (Patrick O'Neal, then Robert Vaughn), Tom's rival and father of Hilary and Simon, and Deanna Kincaid (Jill St. John), Thomas' unscrupulous former sister-in-law, who becomes involved with Russian KGB agent Yuri Bukharin (Robert Loggia).

The show ended with an unresolved cliffhanger, with the revelation that Leslie is the possible daughter of Harlan, due to his rape of her mother (as witnessed by Celia), and with Maggie being kidnapped on her wedding day to Tom by maniac David Marquette (Michael Brandon).

== Episodes ==
No.	Title	Directed by	Written by	Original release date	Prod. code	Viewers (millions)
1	"Pilot"	Harry Falk	Esther & Richard Shapiro	September 26, 1983	2-K01/02	19.2
2	"Pilot"	Harry Falk	Esther & Richard Shapiro	September 26, 1983	2-K01/02	19.2
3	"Episode 3"	Larry Elikann	Story by : Bridget and Jerome Dobson; Teleplay by : Charles & Patti Dizenzo	October 3, 1983	2-K03	15.8
4	"Episode 4"	Bill Duke	Story by : Bridget & Jerome Dobson; Teleplay by : Ron Cowen & Daniel Lipman	October 17, 1983	2-K04	12.7
5	"Episode 5"	Robert Becker	Joyce Armor & Judie Neer	October 24, 1983	2-K05	14.8
6	"Episode 6"	Nick Havinga	Robert Schlitt	October 31, 1983	2-K06	15.3
7	"Episode 7"	Nicholas Sgarro	Robert Schlitt	November 7, 1983	2-K07	14.5
8	"Episode 8"	Alexander Singer	Ron Cowen & Daniel Lipman	November 14, 1983	2-K08	14.7
9	"Episode 9"	Robert Becker	Margaret Armen	November 21, 1983	2-K09	13.7
10	"Episode 10"	Jeffrey Hayden	Joyce Keener	December 5, 1983	2-K10	14.3
11	"Episode 11"	Sheldon Larry	Kathleen A. Shelley	December 12, 1983	2-K11	14.5
12	"The Rescue"	Peter Levin	Stephen Black & Henry Stern	December 19, 1983	2-K12	13.8
13	"Hide and Seek"	Karen Arthur	Eugene Price	January 2, 1984	2-K13	17.2
14	"The Assignment"	John Patterson	Stephen Black & Henry Stern	January 9, 1984	2-K14	9.7
15	"Secrets"	Ernest Pintoff	Michael Russnow	January 16, 1984	2-K15	9.7
16	"Disguises"	Don Medford	Story by : Rita Lakin; Teleplay by : Stephen Black & Henry Stern	January 30, 1984	2-K16	12.3
17	"Lost and Found"	Robert Becker	Story by : Rita Lakin; Teleplay by : Diana Kopald Marcus	February 6, 1984	2-K17	10.5
18	"The Climax"	Ernest Pintoff	Story by : Rita Lakin; Teleplay by : Stephen Black & Henry Stern	February 13, 1984	2-K18	10.3
19	"The Best Laid Plans"	Bill Duke	Story by : Rita Lakin; Teleplay by : Michael Russnow	February 27, 1984	2-K19	9.2
20	"Friends and Lovers"	Larry Elikann	Story by : Rita Lakin; Teleplay by : Stephen Black & Henry Stern	March 2, 1984	2-K20	13.8
21	"Pandora's Box"	Lorraine Senna Ferrara	Story by : Rita Lakin; Teleplay by : Diana Kopald Marcus	March 5, 1984	2-K21	11.1
22	"The Wedding"	Larry Elikann	Story by : Rita Lakin; Teleplay by : Stephen Black & Henry Stern	March 12, 1984	2-K22	10.6

== Ratings ==
Season	Episodes	Start date	End date	Nielsen rank	Nielsen rating
1983–84	22	September 6, 1983	March 12, 1984	65	13.7
