= Rita Lakin =

American dramatist (1930–2023)

- Born: Rita Weisinger; January 24, 1930; New York City, U.S.
- Died: March 23, 2023 (aged 93); Novato, California, U.S.
- Occupations: Screenwriter; novelist
- Spouse(s): Hank Lakin (died 1961) Robert Michael Lewis (1972–1980)
- Children: 3

Rita Lakin (née Weisinger; January 24, 1930 – March 23, 2023) was an American screenwriter, active from around 1962 to 1981. She has credits for 474 produced television scripts spanning 30 productions. She was also a novelist and author of The Only Woman In The Room, a memoir of her life as one of the first female show runners and one of the first women in television (released October 2015, Applause publishing). In fiction, Lakin created the Gladdy Gold Mystery seven-book series (published by Bantam Books), including Getting Old Is Murder, Getting Old Is The Best Revenge, and Getting Old Can Kill You.

Rita Weisinger was born in The Bronx, New York on January 24, 1930. Before moving to Hollywood she lived in Michigan, working as a teacher for Willow Run Community Schools and as a reporter and photographer for the Ypsilanti City Press. She began writing regularly during the early 1960s for such television shows as The Doctors, Dr. Kildare and Peyton Place.

In 1968, she began working as story editor and head writer of The Mod Squad. Along with her husband, Robert Michael Lewis, she created a production company, R. L. Squared. In 1972, she created The Rookies. In 1977, she served as executive producer of the CBS TV adaptation of the 1954 film Executive Suite. She wrote numerous "Movies of the Week" including Women in Chains, and such miniseries as Strong Medicine and Voices of the Heart. In 1981, she developed the TV series adaptation and served as show-runner of Flamingo Road. In 1989, she co-created the medical drama Nightingales. She also wrote or co-authored two original theatrical plays, No Language But a Cry and Saturday Night at Grossinger's.

== Personal life and death ==
Rita Weisinger was first married to Hank Lakin, who died from leukemia due to exposure to radiation in the Santa Susana SRE Nuclear Reactor meltdown (1959) in 1961. She was later married, from 1972 to 1980, to director-producer Robert Michael Lewis. The two met when he directed an episode of The Mod Squad that she wrote. Rita Lakin died in Novato, California, on March 23, 2023, at the age of 93. She was survived by her three children: Howard (b. 1952), Susan (b. 1956), and Gavin (b. 1960) and her four grandchildren: Alison, Megan, James, and Amara.

== Awards ==
Rita Lakin won nominations and awards for her writing including the Writers Guild of America Award, the Edgar Allan Poe Award and the Avery Hopwood Award from the University of Michigan.

== Books ==
Title	Release
Prince Charming, Go Home: A Romantic Comedy	September 14, 2021
The Only Woman in the Room	October 20, 2015
Getting Old Can Kill You	June 28, 2011
Getting Old Is Très Dangereux	June 22, 2010
Getting Old Is a Disaster	December 30, 2008
Getting Old Is to Die For	December 26, 2007
Getting Old Is Criminal	May 1, 2007
Getting Old Is the Best Revenge	March 28, 2006
Getting Old Is Murder	October 25, 2005
A Summer Without Boys	1976
The Four Coins of the Kaballah (formerly Demon of the Night)	1976

== Television ==
Rita Lakin wrote 464 episodes, eight movies of the week, and two miniseries, spanning 30 television productions. She was also the creator of the crime drama series The Rookies and the prime time soap Flamingo Road, and co-creator, with Howard Lakin and Frank Furino, of the medical drama Nightingales produced by Aaron Spelling.

Series	Episodes / Type	Year
Dr. Kildare	A Candle in the Window	1964
Bob Hope Presents the Chrysler Theatre	The Shattered Glass	1964
Daniel Boone	The Reunion	1965
The Virginian	Jennifer	1965
Peyton Place	62 episodes: Episode #2.145 (1966) ... (written by); Episode #2.142 (1966) ... (written by); Episode #2.139 (1966) ... (written by); Episode #2.134 (1966) ... (written by); Episode #2.132 (1966) ... (written by); Episode #2.129 (1966) ... (written by); Episode #2.127 (1966) ... (written by); Episode #2.121 (1966) ... (written by); Episode #2.118 (1966) ... (written by); Episode #2.115 (1966) ... (written by); Episode #2.113 (1966) ... (written by); Episode #2.109 (1966) ... (written by); Episode #2.106 (1966) ... (written by); Episode #2.103 (1966) ... (written by); Episode #2.100 (1966) ... (written by); Episode #2.99 (1966) ... (written by); Episode #2.96 (1966) ... (written by); Episode #2.91 (1966) ... (written by); Episode #2.88 (1966) ... (written by); Episode #2.87 (1966) ... (written by); Episode #2.84 (1966) ... (written by); Episode #2.80 (1966) ... (written by); Episode #2.76 (1966) ... (written by); Episode #2.75 (1966) ... (written by); Episode #2.72 (1966) ... (written by); Episode #2.67 (1966) ... (written by); Episode #2.65 (1966) ... (written by); Episode #2.61 (1966) ... (written by); Episode #2.60 (1966) ... (written by); Episode #2.55 (1966) ... (written by); Episode #2.52 (1966) ... (written by); Episode #2.51 (1966) ... (written by); Episode #2.48 (1965) ... (written by); Episode #2.45 (1965) ... (written by); Episode #2.41 (1965) ... (written by); Episode #2.40 (1965) ... (written by); Episode #2.37 (1965) ... (written by); Episode #2.31 (1965) ... (written by); Episode #2.30 (1965) ... (written by); Episode #2.27 (1965) ... (written by); Episode #2.22 (1965) ... (written by); Episode #2.21 (1965) ... (written by); Episode #2.16 (1965) ... (written by); Episode #2.10 (1965) ... (written by); Episode #2.8 (1965) ... (written by); Episode #2.6 (1965) ... (written by); Episode #2.3 (1965) ... (written by); Episode #1.112 (1965) ... (written by); Episode #1.111 (1965) ... (written by); Episode #1.108 (1965) ... (written by); Episode #1.105 (1965) ... (written by); Episode #1.102 (1965) ... (written by); Episode #1.97 (1965) ... (written by); Episode #1.96 (1965) ... (written by); Episode #1.92 (1965) ... (written by); Episode #1.90 (1965) ... (written by); Episode #1.87 (1965) ... (written by); Episode #1.82 (1965) ... (written by); Episode #1.79 (1965) ... (written by); Episode #1.78 (1965) ... (written by); Episode #1.75 (1965) ... (written by); Episode #1.72 (1965) ... (written by)	1965-1966
Run for Your Life	A Choice of Evils	1967
The Invaders	Moonshot	1967
The Doctors	295 episodes: Episode #1.1623 (1969); Episode #1.1622 (1969); Episode #1.1621 (1969); Episode #1.1620 (1969); Episode #1.1619 (1969); Episode #1.1618 (1969); Episode #1.1617 (1969); Episode #1.1616 (1969); Episode #1.1615 (1969); Episode #1.1614 (1969); Episode #1.1613 (1969); Episode #1.1612 (1969); Episode #1.1611 (1969); Episode #1.1610 (1969); Episode #1.1609 (1969); Episode #1.1608 (1969); Episode #1.1607 (1969); Episode #1.1606 (1969); Episode #1.1605 (1969); Episode #1.1603 (1969); Episode #1.1602 (1969); Episode #1.1601 (1969); Episode #1.1600 (1969); Episode #1.1599 (1969); Episode #1.1598 (1969); Episode #1.1597 (1969); Episode #1.1595 (1969); Episode #1.1594 (1969); Episode #1.1593 (1969); Episode #1.1592 (1969); Episode #1.1591 (1969); Episode #1.1590 (1969); Episode #1.1589 (1969); Episode #1.1588 (1969); Episode #1.1587 (1969); Episode #1.1586 (1969); Episode #1.1585 (1969); Episode #1.1584 (1969); Episode #1.1582 (1968); Episode #1.1581 (1968); Episode #1.1580 (1968); Episode #1.1579 (1968); Episode #1.1578 (1968); Episode #1.1577 (1968); Episode #1.1576 (1968); Episode #1.1575 (1968); Episode #1.1574 (1968); Episode #1.1573 (1968); Episode #1.1572 (1968); Episode #1.1571 (1968); Episode #1.1570 (1968); Episode #1.1569 (1968); Episode #1.1311 (1968); Episode #1.1568 (1968); Episode #1.1567 (1968); Episode #1.1566 (1968); Episode #1.1565 (1968); Episode #1.1564 (1968); Episode #1.1563 (1968); Episode #1.1562 (1968); Episode #1.1561 (1968); Episode #1.1560 (1968); Episode #1.1558 (1968); Episode #1.1557 (1968); Episode #1.1556 (1968); Episode #1.1555 (1968); Episode #1.1554 (1968); Episode #1.1553 (1968); Episode #1.1552 (1968); Episode #1.1551 (1968); Episode #1.1550 (1968); Episode #1.1549 (1968); Episode #1.1548 (1968); Episode #1.1547 (1968); Episode #1.1546 (1968); Episode #1.1545 (1968); Episode #1.1544 (1968); Episode #1.1543 (1968); Episode #1.1542 (1968); Episode #1.1541 (1968); Episode #1.1540 (1968); Episode #1.1536 (1968); Episode #1.1535 (1968); Episode #1.1534 (1968); Episode #1.1533 (1968); Episode #1.1532 (1968); Episode #1.1531 (1968); Episode #1.1530 (1968); Episode #1.1529 (1968); Episode #1.1528 (1968); Episode #1.1527 (1968); Episode #1.1526 (1968); Episode #1.1525 (1968); Episode #1.1524 (1968); Episode #1.1523 (1968); Episode #1.1522 (1968); Episode #1.1521 (1968); Episode #1.1520 (1968); Episode #1.1519 (1968); Episode #1.1518 (1968); Episode #1.1517 (1968); Episode #1.1516 (1968); Episode #1.1515 (1968); Episode #1.1514 (1968); Episode #1.1513 (1968); Episode #1.1512 (1968); Episode #1.1511 (1968); Episode #1.1510 (1968); Episode #1.1509 (1968); Episode #1.1508 (1968); Episode #1.1507 (1968); Episode #1.1506 (1968); Episode #1.1505 (1968); Episode #1.1504 (1968); Episode #1.1503 (1968); Episode #1.1502 (1968); Episode #1.1501 (1968); Episode #1.1500 (1968); Episode #1.1499 (1968); Episode #1.1497 (1968); Episode #1.1496 (1968); Episode #1.1495 (1968); Episode #1.1494 (1968); Episode #1.1493 (1968); Episode #1.1492 (1968); Episode #1.1491 (1968); Episode #1.1490 (1968); Episode #1.1489 (1968); Episode #1.1488 (1968); Episode #1.1487 (1968); Episode #1.1486 (1968); Episode #1.1485 (1968); Episode #1.1484 (1968); Episode #1.1483 (1968); Episode #1.1482 (1968); Episode #1.1481 (1968); Episode #1.1480 (1968); Episode #1.1479 (1968); Episode #1.1478 (1968); Episode #1.1477 (1968); Episode #1.1476 (1968); Episode #1.1475 (1968); Episode #1.1474 (1968); Episode #1.1473 (1968); Episode #1.1472 (1968); Episode #1.1471 (1968); Episode #1.1470 (1968); Episode #1.1469 (1968); Episode #1.1468 (1968); Episode #1.1467 (1968); Episode #1.1466 (1968); Episode #1.1465 (1968); Episode #1.1464 (1968); Episode #1.1463 (1968); Episode #1.1462 (1968); Episode #1.1461 (1968); Episode #1.1460 (1968); Episode #1.1459 (1968); Episode #1.1458 (1968); Episode #1.1456 (1968); Episode #1.1455 (1968); Episode #1.1454 (1968); Episode #1.1453 (1968); Episode #1.1452 (1968); Episode #1.1451 (1968); Episode #1.1450 (1968); Episode #1.1449 (1968); Episode #1.1448 (1968); Episode #1.1447 (1968); Episode #1.1445 (1968); Episode #1.1444 (1968); Episode #1.1443 (1968); Episode #1.1442 (1968); Episode #1.1441 (1968); Episode #1.1440 (1968); Episode #1.1438 (1968); Episode #1.1436 (1968); Episode #1.1435 (1968); Episode #1.1434 (1968); Episode #1.1433 (1968); Episode #1.1432 (1968); Episode #1.1430 (1968); Episode #1.1429 (1968); Episode #1.1428 (1968); Episode #1.1426 (1968); Episode #1.1425 (1968); Episode #1.1424 (1968); Episode #1.1423 (1968); Episode #1.1421 (1968); Episode #1.1419 (1968); Episode #1.1417 (1968); Episode #1.1416 (1968); Episode #1.1414 (1968); Episode #1.1412 (1968); Episode #1.1411 (1968); Episode #1.1410 (1968); Episode #1.1409 (1968); Episode #1.1408 (1968); Episode #1.1407 (1968); Episode #1.1406 (1968); Episode #1.1405 (1968); Episode #1.1404 (1968); Episode #1.1403 (1968); Episode #1.1402 (1968); Episode #1.1401 (1968); Episode #1.1400 (1968); Episode #1.1399 (1968); Episode #1.1398 (1968); Episode #1.1397 (1968); Episode #1.1396 (1968); Episode #1.1395 (1968); Episode #1.1394 (1968); Episode #1.1393 (1968); Episode #1.1392 (1968); Episode #1.1391 (1968); Episode #1.1390 (1968); Episode #1.1389 (1968); Episode #1.1388 (1968); Episode #1.1387 (1968); Episode #1.1385 (1968); Episode #1.1384 (1968); Episode #1.1383 (1968); Episode #1.1382 (1968); Episode #1.1381 (1968); Episode #1.1380 (1968); Episode #1.1379 (1968); Episode #1.1378 (1968); Episode #1.1377 (1968); Episode #1.1374 (1968); Episode #1.1373 (1968); Episode #1.1372 (1968); Episode #1.1371 (1968); Episode #1.1370 (1968); Episode #1.1369 (1968); Episode #1.1368 (1968); Episode #1.1367 (1968); Episode #1.1366 (1968); Episode #1.1365 (1968); Episode #1.1361 (1968); Episode #1.1360 (1968); Episode #1.1359 (1968); Episode #1.1358 (1968); Episode #1.1357 (1968); Episode #1.1356 (1968); Episode #1.1355 (1968); Episode #1.1354 (1968); Episode #1.1353 (1968); Episode #1.1352 (1968); Episode #1.1351 (1968); Episode #1.1350 (1968); Episode #1.1349 (1968); Episode #1.1348 (1968); Episode #1.1347 (1968); Episode #1.1346 (1968); Episode #1.1345 (1968); Episode #1.1344 (1968); Episode #1.1343 (1968); Episode #1.1342 (1968); Episode #1.1341 (1968); Episode #1.1340 (1968); Episode #1.1339 (1968); Episode #1.1338 (1968); Episode #1.1337 (1968); Episode #1.1336 (1968); Episode #1.1335 (1968); Episode #1.1334 (1968); Episode #1.1333 (1968); Episode #1.1332 (1968); Episode #1.1331 (1968); Episode #1.1330 (1968); Episode #1.1329 (1968); Episode #1.1328 (1968); Episode #1.1327 (1968); Episode #1.1326 (1968); Episode #1.1325 (1968); Episode #1.1324 (1967); Episode #1.1323 (1967); Episode #1.1322 (1967); Episode #1.1321 (1967); Episode #1.1320 (1967); Episode #1.1318 (1967); Episode #1.1317 (1967); Episode #1.1316 (1967); Episode #1.1315 (1967); Episode #1.1314 (1967); Episode #1.1313 (1967); Episode #1.1312 (1967); Episode #1.1310 (1967); Episode #1.1309 (1967); Episode #1.1308 (1967); Episode #1.1307 (1967); Episode #1.1306 (1967); Episode #1.1305 (1967); Episode #1.1625 (1969); Episode #1.1624 (1969)	1967-1969
The Outsider	2 episodes: Service for One 1969; The Flip Side 1969	1969
Family Affair	2 episodes: Uncle Prince Charming (1969) ... (written by); The Baby Sitters (1968) ... (written by)	1968-1969
The Mod Squad	Executive Story Editor 30 episodes, Writer 3 episodes: A Double for Danger (1971) ... (executive story editor); Is That Justice? No, It's the Law (1971) ... (executive story editor); Kicks Incorporated (1971) ... (executive story editor); A Short Course in War (1971) ... (executive story editor); The Judas Trap (1970) ... (executive story editor); A Time of Hyacinths (1970) ... (executive story editor); A Far Away Place So Near (1970) ... (executive story editor); Welcome to the Human Race, Levi Frazee! (1970) ... (executive story editor); Search and Destroy (1970) ... (executive story editor); 'A' Is for Annie (1970) ... (executive story editor); The Loser (1970) ... (executive story editor); Should Auld Acquaintance Be Forgot! (1970) ... (executive story editor, teleplay); Call Back Yesterday (1970) ... (executive story editor); Return to Darkness, Return to Light (1970) ... (executive story editor); A Time for Remembering (1970) ... (executive story editor); The Deadly Sin (1970) ... (executive story editor); The Exile (1970) ... (executive story editor); Mother of Sorrow (1970) ... (written by); The Debt (1969) ... (executive story editor); Never Give the Fuzz an Even Break (1969) ... (executive story editor); In This Corner - Sol Alpert (1969) ... (executive story editor, teleplay); The Healer (1969) ... (executive story editor); A Place to Run, a Heart to Hide In (1969) ... (executive story editor); The Death of Wild Bill Hannachek (1969) ... (executive story editor); Willie Poor Boy (1969) ... (executive story editor); Confrontation! (1969) ... (executive story editor); Lisa (1969) ... (executive story editor); To Linc - With Love (1969) ... (executive story editor); Ride the Man Down (1969) ... (executive story editor); An Eye for an Eye (1969) ... (executive story editor); My Name Is Manolete (1969) ... (executive story editor); The Girl in Chair Nine (1969) ... (executive story editor)	1969-1971
Death Takes a Holiday	TV movie	1971
Women in Chains	TV movie	1972
A Summer Without Boys	TV movie	1973
Message to My Daughter	TV movie	1973
The ABC Afternoon Playbreak	Last Bride of Salem	1974
The Rookies	Creator, TV Series, 26 episodes: The Shield (1975) ... (creator); Angel (1975) ... (creator); Easy Money (1973) ... (creator); A Farewell Tree from Marly (1973) ... (creator); Life Robbery (1973) ... (creator); The Wheel of Death (1973) ... (creator); Three Hours to Kill (1973) ... (creator); Point of Impact (1973) ... (creator); Snow Job (1973) ... (creator); Crossfire (1973) ... (creator); Tarnished Idol (1973) ... (creator); Rabbits on the Runway (1972) ... (creator); A Very Special Piece of Ground (1972) ... (creator); A Bloody Shade of Blue (1972) ... (creator); A Deadly Velocity (1972) ... (creator); To Taste of Terror (1972) ... (creator); The Good Die Young (1972) ... (creator); Dirge for Sunday (1972) ... (creator); The Bear That Didn't Get Up (1972) ... (creator); Time Is the Fire (1972) ... (creator); Covenant with Death (1972) ... (creator); The Commitment (1972) ... (creator); The Informant (1972) ... (creator); Dead, Like a Lost Dream (1972) ... (creator); Concrete Valley, Neon Sky (1972) ... (creator); Pilot (1972) ... (story)	1972-1975
Medical Center	2 episodes: The Fourth Sex: Part 2 (1975) ... (written by); The Fourth Sex: Part 1 (1975) ... (written by)	1975
Hey, I'm Alive	TV movie	1975
Medical Story	Us Against the World	1975
A Sensitive, Passionate Man	TV movie	1975
Torn Between Two Lovers	TV movie	1975
Executive Suite	TV series, Executive Producer	1976
Flamingo Road	Creator, TV Series, Executive Consultant 22 episodes, Writer 38 episodes: Murder, They Said (1982) ... (creator, executive consultant); The Harder They Fall (1982) ... (creator, executive consultant); An Eye for an Eye (1982) ... (creator, executive consultant); The Bad and the Beautiful (1982) ... (creator, executive consultant); The High and the Mighty (1982) ... (creator, executive consultant); No Dice (1982) ... (creator, executive consultant); Sins of the Father (1982) ... (creator, executive consultant); The Dedication (1982) ... (creator, executive consultant); Double Exposure (1982) ... (creator, executive consultant); Chance of a Lifetime (1982) ... (creator, executive consultant); The Explosion (1982) ... (creator, executive consultant); To Catch a Thief (1982) ... (creator, executive consultant); Heatwave (1982) ... (creator, executive consultant); Strange Bedfellows (1982) ... (creator, executive consultant); Old Friends (1982) ... (creator, executive consultant); The Little Foxes (1981) ... (creator, executive consultant); The Powers That Be (1981) ... (creator, executive consultant); The Stranger (1981) ... (creator, executive consultant); The Intruder (1981) ... (creator, executive consultant); The Substitute (1981) ... (creator, executive consultant); The Victim (1981) ... (creator, executive consultant); The Arrangement (1981) ... (creator, executive consultant); Bad Chemistry (1981) ... (creator, supervising producer); Hurricane (1981) ... (creator, supervising producer); Hell Hath No Fury (1981) ... (creator, supervising producer); They Drive by Night (1981) ... (creator, supervising producer); Secrets (1981) ... (creator, supervising producer); Bad Girl (1981) ... (creator, supervising producer); Trapped (1981) ... (creator, supervising producer); Jealous Wife (1981) ... (creator, supervising producer); The Election (1981) ... (creator, supervising producer); The Fish Fry (1981) ... (creator, supervising producer); A Mother's Revenge (1981) ... (creator, supervising producer); The Titus Tapes (1981) ... (creator, supervising producer); Illicit Weekend (1981) ... (creator, supervising producer); The Hostages: Part 2 (1981) ... (creator, supervising producer); The Hostages: Part 1 (1981) ... (creator, supervising producer); Pilot (1980) ... (teleplay)	1980-1982
Emerald Point NAS	7 episodes, TV Series: The Wedding (1984) ... (story - as Susan Howard, creative consultant); Pandora's Box (1984) ... (story - as Susan Howard, creative consultant); Friends and Lovers (1984) ... (story - as Susan Howard, creative consultant); The Best Laid Plans (1984) ... (story - as Susan Howard, creative consultant); The Climax (1984) ... (story - as Susan Howard, creative consultant); Lost and Found (1984) ... (story - as Susan Howard, creative consultant); Disguises (1984) ... (story, creative consultant)	1984
Her Life as a Man	TV movie, Executive Consultant	1984
Peyton Place: The Next Generation	TV movie	1985
Strong Medicine	TV Miniseries	1986
Dynasty	10 episodes, TV Series: Shadow Play (1987) ... (story); The Affair (1987) ... (story); The Confession (1987) ... (story); The Sublet (1987) ... (story); Valez (1987) ... (story); The Dress (1987) ... (story); The Shower (1987) ... (story); The Garage (1987) ... (story); The Surgery (1987) ... (story); The Mothers (1987) ... (story)	1987
Nightingales	Creator, Supervising Producer, Writer TV Movie	1988
Voice of the Heart	TV Miniseries	1989
Nightingales	13 episodes, TV Series: Episode #1.13 (1989) ... (creator); Episode #1.12 (1989) ... (creator); Episode #1.11 (1989) ... (creator); Episode #1.10 (1989) ... (creator); Episode #1.9 (1989) ... (creator); Episode #1.8 (1989) ... (creator); Episode #1.7 (1989) ... (creator); Episode #1.6 (1989) ... (creator); Episode #1.5 (1989) ... (creator); Episode #1.4 (1989) ... (creator); Episode #1.3 (1989) ... (creator); Episode #1.2 (1989) ... (creator); Pilot (1989) ... (creator)	1989
