= The Love Butcher =

- Directed by: Mikel Angel; Don Jones
- Written by: Mikel Angel; James M. Tanenbaum
- Produced by: Micky Belski; Gary Williams
- Starring: James Lemp; Kay Neer; Richard Kennedy; Robin Sherwood
- Cinematography: Don Jones; Austin McKinney
- Edited by: Robert Freeman
- Music by: Richard Hieronymus
- Production company: Mirror Releasing
- Release date: December 1, 1975
- Running time: 83 minutes
- Country: United States
- Language: English

The Love Butcher is a 1975 American slasher film directed by Mikel Angel and Don Jones, and starring James Lemp, Kay Neer, Richard Kennedy, and Robin Sherwood. Its plot follows a series of violent murders being committed in an affluent neighborhood by a demented middle-aged gardener.

== Plot ==
Caleb is a lonely, physically crippled middle-aged gardener who works and resides in an affluent neighborhood in Los Angeles. Caleb is tormented by a delusion that his deceased brother, Lester, who was always more successful and attractive, lives in his house. Caleb is taunted by his delusional visions of Lester, who continually insults him and derides his appearance.

Caleb begins dissociating and embodying Lester, removing his glasses and gardening outfit, wearing a wig, and dressing and acting as his suave deceased brother. Under this guise, Caleb begins committing a series of brutal murders in the neighborhood which puzzle the police and a local reporter, Russell.

Sheila, a young woman in the neighborhood, informs Caleb she will be alone for two weeks as her older husband, Carl, will be gone on a business trip. The two end up in an argument, and Sheila fires Caleb. Later that night, Caleb impersonates a Mexican record salesman and manages to infiltrate Sheila's house, appealing to her love of rock music. He later drowns Sheila in her swimming pool by shoving a running hose down her throat.

Caleb is driven increasingly insane. Meanwhile, Russell's girlfriend, Flo, is attacked by Caleb (posed as Lester) in her home. Russell, having been investigating the murders, comes to the realization that Caleb is the killer, and rushes to Flo's house, only to be butchered by Caleb. Caleb torments Flo until she eventually begs him to kill her, leading him to bludgeon her to death with a bed rake.

Caleb flees the house and evades police, but is eventually caught the next day, while he recalls a childhood memory of his brother Lester's funeral, during which their mother told Caleb she wished he had died instead.

== Cast ==
- James Lemp as Caleb / Lester (as Erik Stern)
- Kay Neer as Flo
- Jeremiah Beecher as Russell
- Richard Kennedy as Don (as Edward Roehm)
- Robin Sherwood as Sheila
- Eve Mac as Pat
- Robert Walter as Joe
- Louis Ojena as Carl
- John Parker as Minister (as John Stoglin)
- Marilyn Jones as Lena

== Critical response ==
Film scholar Stephen Thrower likens The Love Butcher to "something of a curate's egg, with its sleazy murder theme pulling against a broadly satirical depiction of the killer as super-nerd turned super-stud."

== Sources ==
- Hallenbeck, Bruce G. (2009). Comedy-Horror Films: A Chronological History, 1914-2008. Jefferson, North Carolina: McFarland. ISBN 978-0-786-45378-8.
- Thrower, Stephen (2007). Nightmare USA: The Untold Story of the Exploitation Independents. London, England: FAB Press. ISBN 978-1-903-25446-2.
