= Don Bousquet =

American cartoonist (b. 1948)

Don Bousquet (born 1948) is a Rhode Island–based cartoonist. He was born in Pawtucket, Rhode Island. His cartoon Bousquet regularly appears in The Providence Journal, Rhode Island Monthly, and the South County Independent and his work has also appeared in numerous other publications, such as Yankee Magazine. Most of Bousquet's best sellers were published by Covered Bridge Press. On March 29, 2014, Bousquet retired from one of his most visible platforms, his Sunday placement in The Providence Journal, and would be "winding down" his drawing.

== Business ==
Bousquet and his son started up a company named Don Bousquet and Son Aerial Photography. Their business has been taking photos in the sky since the 1980s. Their photos have been used for a number of occasions which include: the promotion of events, selling of real estate, and advertisements.

== Family ==
Bousquet has two sons named Nathan and Michael. He and his wife Laura live in South County, RI.

== Partial bibliography ==
- Beware of the Quahog (out of print) Covered Bridge Press
- I Brake for Quahogs (out of print)
- The Quahog Walks Among Us (out of print)
- The New England Experience (Yankee Books, 1987; out of print)
- Don Bousquet's New England (out of print)
- Best of the Quahog Trilogy (out of print)
- The Quahog Stops Here
- Quahogs Are a Girl's Best Friend (Covered Bridge Press)
- A Rhode Island Album
- Don Bousquet's Next Book
- Revenge of the Quahog
- A Workingmans Skiff (with William Campbell)
- Rhode Island Dictionary (with Mark Patinkin)
- Rhode Island Handbook (with Mark Patinkin)
- New England Fish Tale
- Quahog State of Mind (1995)
- Don Bousquet's Rhode Island Cookbook (with Martha Murphy)
- The Don Bousquet Greeting Card Collection
