= Nightingales (American TV series) =

1989 American television series

- Genre: Medical drama
- Created by: Rita Lakin; Frank Furino; Howard Lakin
- Written by: Frank Furino; Howard Lakin; Rita Lakin
- Starring: Suzanne Pleshette; Barry Newman; Susan Walters; Chelsea Field; Kristy Swanson; Taylor Fry; Fran Bennett; Gil Gerard; Jennifer Rhodes; Roxann Dawson; Kim Johnston Ulrich
- Composer: John E. Davis
- Country of origin: United States
- Original language: English
- No. of seasons: 1
- No. of episodes: 13

Production
- Executive producers: Aaron Spelling; Douglas S. Cramer
- Production company: Aaron Spelling Productions

Original release
- Network: NBC
- Release: January 21 – April 26, 1989

Nightingales is an American medical drama television series that aired on NBC from January 21 to April 26, 1989. It was produced by Aaron Spelling Productions.

== Premise ==
The series follows the stories of Christine Broderick, a supervisor of student nurses, portrayed by Suzanne Pleshette, and her five nursing students: Sam, Bridget, Yolanda, Becky, and Allyson. Other hospital personnel include Christine's love interest, Dr. Paul Petrillo; the head nurse, Lenore Ritt; and the chief of staff, Dr. Garrett Braden. Nurse Sam also has a daughter, Megan.

== Cast ==
- Suzanne Pleshette as Christine Broderick
- Chelsea Field as Sam Sullivan
- Kristy Swanson as Becky Granger
- Susan Walters as Bridget Loring
- Roxann Dawson as Yolanda Puente
- Kim Johnston Ulrich as Allyson Yates
- Taylor Fry as Megan Sullivan
- Fran Bennett as Lenore Ritt
- Barry Newman as Dr. Garrett Braden

== Episodes ==
No.	Title	Directed by	Written by	Original release date	Viewers (millions)	Rating/share (households)
0	"Pilot"	Mimi Leder	Story by : Rita Lakin & Frank Furino and Howard Lakin; Teleplay by : Howard Lakin	June 27, 1988	N/A	18.9/33
1	"Episode 01"	Mimi Leder	Deborah Zoe Dawson & Victoria Johns	January 25, 1989	20.5	15.1/26
2	"Episode 02"	Arthur Allan Seidelman	Don Roos	February 1, 1989	18.0	13.1/22
3	"Episode 03"	Nancy Malone	Dianne Mesina & Lou Messina	February 8, 1989	15.9	11.6/18
4	"Episode 04"	Michael Fresco	Kimmer Ringwald	February 15, 1989	18.0	13.4/24
5	"Episode 05"	Arthur Allan Seidelman	Ann Donahue	February 22, 1989	18.1	13.1/22
6	"Episode 06"	Nancy Malone	Larry Barber & Paul Barber	March 1, 1989	19.2	14.0/25
7	"Episode 07"	Robert Becker	Don Roos	March 15, 1989	15.9	11.4/20
8	"Episode 08"	Michael Vejar	Story by : Deborah Zoe Dawson & Victoria Johns; Teleplay by : Jean Clarke	March 22, 1989	17.8	12.9/23
9	"Episode 09"	Kevin Hooks	Ann Donahue	April 5, 1989	17.6	13.2/23
10	"Episode 10"	Jerry Jameson	Story by : Ann Donahue & Isabella Benson; Teleplay by : Ann Donahue	April 12, 1989	17.5	13.0/23
11	"Episode 11"	Unknown	Unknown	April 19, 1989	16.2	11.9/22
12	"Episode 12"	Reza Badiyi	Victoria Johns & Deborah Zoe Dawson	April 26, 1989	15.3	11.6/20

== Production ==
The series was developed from a pilot television film, also titled Nightingales, that was directed by Mimi Leder and originally aired in June 1988. Field, Walters, Swanson, Bennett, and Jennifer Rhodes (as Effie Gardner) are the only members of the cast to appear in both the film and the series.

The show has never been released for home media officially on either DVD or any streaming format.

== Reception ==
The series was described in the Chicago Tribune as portraying nursing students as women who "don't spend much time studying...[but] do hang around in their underwear a lot". Nightingales was criticized for "demeaning the nursing profession...by portraying five student nurses as lusty bimbos", and the American Nurses Association initiated a letter-writing campaign that prompted several of the show's sponsors to withdraw their advertising. The series was cancelled after 13 episodes. Aaron Spelling briefly revived the show's premise in syndication as the 1995 series University Hospital, with a completely different cast. This variant only lasted one season as well.
