= Clinton health care plan of 1993 =

Proposed U.S. law

The Clinton health care plan of 1993, colloquially referred to as Hillarycare, was an American healthcare reform package proposed by the Clinton administration and closely associated with the chair of the task force devising the plan, first lady Hillary Clinton. Bill Clinton had campaigned heavily on health care in the 1992 presidential election. The task force was created in January 1993, but its own processes were somewhat controversial and drew litigation. Its goal was to come up with a comprehensive plan to provide universal health care for all Americans, which was to be a cornerstone of the administration's first-term agenda. President Clinton delivered a major health care speech to a joint session of the U.S. Congress on September 22, 1993, during which he proposed an enforced mandate for employers to provide health insurance coverage to all of their employees.

Opposition to the plan was heavy from conservatives, libertarians, and the health insurance industry. The industry produced a highly effective television ad, "Harry and Louise", in an effort to rally public support against the plan. Instead of uniting behind the original proposal, many Democrats offered a number of competing plans of their own. Hillary Clinton was drafted by the Clinton administration to head a new task force and sell the plan to the American people, which ultimately backfired amid the barrage from the pharmaceutical and health insurance industries and considerably diminished her own popularity. On September 26, 1994, the final compromise Democratic bill was declared dead by Senate majority leader George J. Mitchell.

== Provisions ==
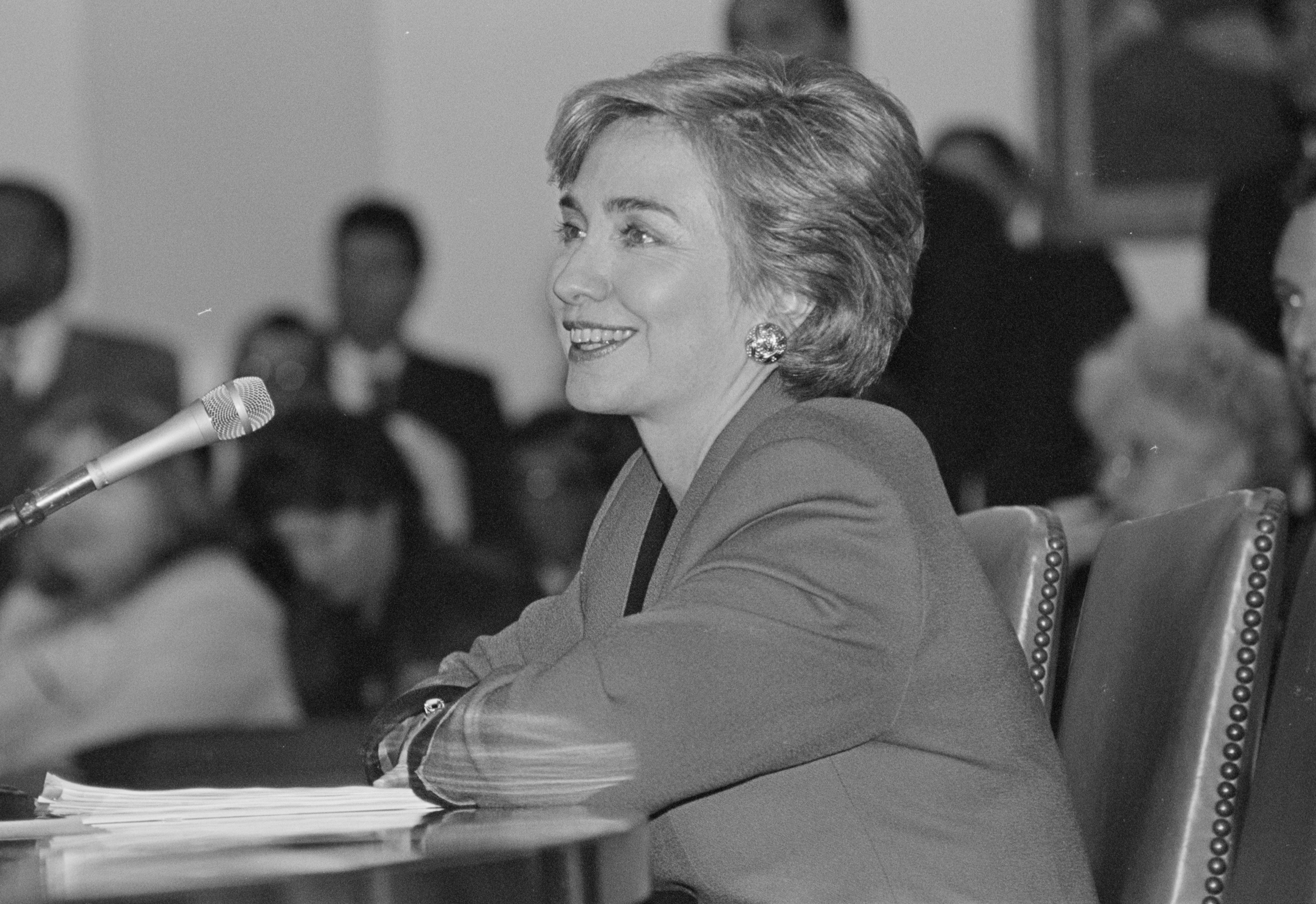
First Lady Hillary Clinton at her presentation on health care in September 1993

According to an address to Congress by President Clinton on September 22, 1993, the proposed bill would provide a "health care security card" to every citizen that would irrevocably entitle them to medical treatment and preventative services, including for pre-existing conditions. To achieve this, the Clinton health plan required each US citizen and permanent resident alien to become enrolled in a qualified health plan on his or her own or through programs mandated to be offered by businesses with more than 5,000 full-time employees. Subsidies were to be provided to those too poor to afford coverage, including complete subsidies for those below a set income level. Users would choose plans offered by regional health alliances to be established by each state. These alliances would purchase insurance coverage for the state's residents and could set fees for doctors who charge per procedure. The act provided funding to be sent to the states for the administration of the plan, beginning at $14 billion in 1993 and reaching $38 billion by 2003.

The plan specified which benefits must be offered; a National Health Board to oversee the quality of health care services; enhanced physician training; the creation of model information systems; federal funding in the case of the insolvency of state programs; rural health programs; long-term care programs; coverage for abortions, with a "conscience clause" to exempt practitioners with religious objections; malpractice and antitrust reform; fraud prevention measures; and a prescription drug benefit for Medicare, among other features.

== Task Force ==
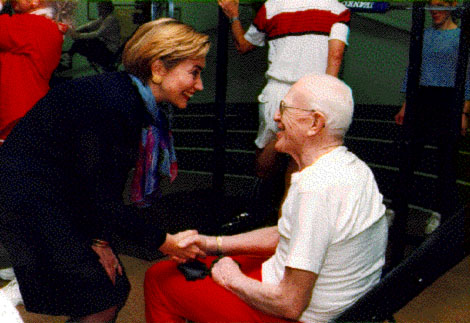
Bill Clinton made health care reform one of his highest priorities; the First Lady Hillary Rodham Clinton chaired the Task Force on National Health Care Reform.

Once in office, President Bill Clinton quickly set up the Task Force on National Health Care Reform, headed by First Lady Hillary Clinton, to come up with a comprehensive plan to provide universal health care for all Americans, which was to be a cornerstone of the administration's first-term agenda. He delivered a major health care speech to a joint session of the U.S. Congress on September 22, 1993. In that speech, he explained the problem:

Millions of Americans are just a pink slip away from losing their health insurance, and one serious illness away from losing all their savings. Millions more are locked into the jobs they have now just because they or someone in their family has once been sick and they have what is called the preexisting condition. And on any given day, over 37 million Americans—most of them working people and their little children—have no health insurance at all. And in spite of all this, our medical bills are growing at over twice the rate of inflation, and the United States spends over a third more of its income on health care than any other nation on Earth.

Her leading role in the project was unprecedented for a presidential spouse. This unusual decision by the president to put his wife in charge of the project has been attributed to several factors, such as his desire to emphasize his personal commitment to the enterprise.

== Deliberations ==
After President Clinton announced the formation of the Task Force, media began to criticize the secrecy surrounding its deliberations, eventually leading to a public disclosure of the names of those involved. Starting on September 28, 1993, Hillary Clinton appeared for several days of testimony before five congressional committees on health care. Opponents of the bill organized against it before it was presented to the Democratic-controlled Congress on November 20, 1993. The bill was a complex proposal of more than 1,000 pages, the core element of which was an enforced mandate for employers to provide health insurance coverage to all of their employees. The full text of the November 20 bill (the Health Security Act) remains publicly available.

Prominent opposition to the Clinton plan was led by William Kristol and his policy group Project for the Republican Future, which is widely credited with orchestrating the plan's defeat through a series of now legendary "policy memos" faxed to Republican leaders.

It [the Clinton healthcare plan] will revive the reputation of the party that spends and regulates, the Democrats, as the generous protector of middle-class interests. And it will at the same time strike a punishing blow against Republican claims to defend the middle class by restraining government.

— William Kristol, "Defeating President Clinton's Healthcare Proposal", December 1993

Conservatives, libertarians, and the health insurance industry proceeded to campaign against the plan, criticizing it as being overly bureaucratic and restrictive of patient choice. The Heritage Foundation argued that "the Clinton Administration is imposing a top-down, command-and-control system of global budgets and premium caps, a superintending National Health Board and a vast system of government sponsored regional alliances, along with a panoply of advisory boards, panels, and councils, interlaced with the expanded operations of the agencies of Department of Health and Human Services and the Department of Labor, issuing innumerable rules, regulations, guidelines, and standards."

The effort also included extensive advertising criticizing the plan, including the famous "Harry and Louise" ad, paid for by the Health Insurance Association of America, which depicted a middle-class couple despairing over the plan's complex, bureaucratic nature. Time, CBS News, CNN, The Wall Street Journal, and The Christian Science Monitor ran stories questioning whether there really was a health care crisis. Op-eds were written against it, including one in The Washington Post by conservative University of Virginia Professor Martha Derthick that said,

In many years of studying American social policy, I have never read an official document that seemed so suffused with coercion and political naivete... with its drastic prescriptions for controlling the conduct of state governments, employers, drug manufacturers, doctors, hospitals and you and me.

Democratic Senator Daniel Patrick Moynihan qualified his agreement that "there is no health care crisis" by stating "there is an insurance crisis" but also indicated "anyone who thinks [the Clinton health care plan] can work in the real world as presently written isn't living in it." Meanwhile, instead of uniting behind the President's original proposal, other Democrats offered a number of competing plans of their own. Some criticized the plan from the left, preferring a single-payer healthcare system.

== Litigation ==
The First Lady's role in the secret proceedings of the Health Care Task Force also sparked litigation in the U.S. Court of Appeals for the D.C. Circuit in relation to the Federal Advisory Committee Act (FACA), which requires openness in government. The Clinton White House argued that the Recommendation Clause in Article II of the US Constitution would make it unconstitutional to apply the procedural requirements of FACA to her participation in the meetings of the Task Force. Some constitutional experts argued to the court that such a legal theory was not supported by the text, the history, or the structure of the Constitution. Ultimately, Hillary Clinton won the litigation in June 1993, when the D.C. Circuit ruled narrowly that the First Lady could be deemed a government official (and not a mere private citizen) for the purpose of not having to comply with the procedural requirements of FACA.

Also in February 1993, the Association of American Physicians and Surgeons, along with several other groups, filed a lawsuit against Hillary Clinton and Donna Shalala over closed-door meetings related to the health care plan. The AAPS sued to gain access to the list of members of the task force. In 1997, Judge Royce C. Lamberth found in favor of the plaintiffs and awarded $285,864 to the AAPS for legal costs; Lamberth also harshly criticized the Clinton administration and Clinton aide Ira Magaziner in his ruling. Subsequently, in 1999, a federal appeals court overturned the award and the initial findings on the basis that Magaziner and the administration had not acted in bad faith.

== Defeat ==
In August 1994, Democratic Senate Majority Leader George J. Mitchell introduced a compromise proposal that would have delayed requirements of employers until 2002 and exempted small businesses. However, "even with Mitchell’s bill, there were not enough Democratic Senators behind a single proposal to pass a bill, let alone stop a filibuster." A few weeks later, Mitchell announced that his compromise plan was dead and that health care reform would have to wait at least until the next Congress. The defeat was embarrassing for the administration, emboldened Republicans, and contributed to the notion that Hillary Clinton was a "big-government liberal" as decried by conservative opponents.

The 1994 mid-term election became, in the opinion of one media observer, a "referendum on big government – Hillary Clinton had launched a massive health-care reform plan that wound up strangled by its own red tape". In that 1994 election, the Republican revolution, led by Newt Gingrich, gave the GOP control of both the House of Representatives and the Senate for the first time since the 83rd Congress of 1953–1954, ending prospects for a Clinton-sponsored health care overhaul. Comprehensive health care reform in the United States was not seriously considered or enacted by Congress until Barack Obama's election in 2008, and the U.S. remains the only developed country without universal health care.

== Legacy ==
In 2004, as a US senator from New York, Hillary Clinton argued in The New York Times that the current health care system is unsustainable, and she offered several solutions. Her article also mentioned areas of agreement with onetime opponent Newt Gingrich, and likewise Gingrich has expressed agreement with Clinton on some aspects of health care, including a bill to modernize medical record keeping.

In 2005, referring to her previous efforts at health care reform, she said, "I learned some valuable lessons about the legislative process, the importance of bipartisan cooperation and the wisdom of taking small steps to get a big job done." Again in 2007, she reflected on her role in 1993–1994: "I think that both the process and the plan were flawed. We were trying to do something that was very hard to do, and we made a lot of mistakes."

She received hundreds of thousands of dollars in campaign contributions from doctors, hospitals, drug companies, and insurance companies for her 2006 re-election in the Senate, including several insurance companies that were members of the Health Insurance Association of America that helped defeat the Clinton Health Plan in 1994. Charles N. Kahn III, a Republican who was executive vice president of the Health Insurance Association in 1993 and 1994, refers to his previous battles with Clinton as "ancient history", and says "she is extremely knowledgeable about health care and has become a Congressional leader on the issue."

Until the Affordable Healthcare for America Act, a combination of factors kept health care off the top of the agenda. For example, politicians were not eager to confront the forces that successfully frustrated the Clinton effort, health maintenance organizations were able to limit cost increases to some extent, and a conservative Republican majority in Congress or a conservative Republican president was in power or in office.

The Clinton health care plan remains the most prominent national proposal associated with Hillary Clinton and may have influenced her prospects in the 2008 presidential election. There were some similarities between Clinton's plan and Republican Mitt Romney's health care plan, which had been implemented in Massachusetts, though Romney distanced himself from Clinton on the issue, in particular arguing that his plan called for more control at the state level and the private market, not from the federal government.

In September 2007, former Clinton Administration senior health policy advisor Paul Starr published an article, "The Hillarycare Mythology", and he wrote that Bill, not Hillary, was the driving force behind the plan at all stages of its origination and development; the task force headed by her quickly became useless and was not the primary force behind formulating the proposed policy; and "[n]ot only did the fiction of Hillary's personal responsibility for the health plan fail to protect the president at the time, it has also now come back to haunt her in her own quest for the presidency."

The 2020 edition of Siena College Research Institute's First Ladies Survey included a supplementary question asking historians and scholars to assess the effectiveness of signature initiatives of the ten first ladies between 1964 and 2020. Clinton's efforts at healthcare reform were ranked 8th in effectiveness among the signature ten initiatives.

== See also ==
- Health Security Express
- History of health care reform in the United States
