= Mark Patinkin =

American writer

Mark Patinkin is an American author and nationally syndicated columnist for the Providence Journal. He was a Pulitzer Prize finalist for international reporting for his coverage of The Troubles in Northern Ireland. He has won three New England Emmy awards for television commentaries. He is also the author of several books. A graduate of Middlebury College, he lives in Providence, Rhode Island.

== Partial bibliography ==
- Up and Running
  A non-fiction book about a boy who lost two legs, but continued playing hockey.
- Rhode Island Dictionary (with Don Bousquet)
- Rhode Island Handbook (with Don Bousquet)
- The Silent War (with Ira Magaziner)
