= Goddard Gunster =

American lobbying firm

Gunster Strategies Worldwide
- Founder: Ben Goddard
- Headquarters: 2121 K Street NW Suite 850; Washington, DC 20037; United States
- President: Gerry Gunster
- Chief Strategy Officer: Daniel Colegrove
- Website: www.gunsterstrategies.com

Gunster Strategies Worldwide is an American lobbying firm and referendum specialist founded by the late Ben Goddard. Its current president is Gerry Gunster.

== Leave.EU ==
In 2016 Goddard Gunster were engaged (through businessman Arron Banks) by Leave.EU, a political campaign group that supported the United Kingdom's withdrawal from the European Union (Brexit) in the June 2016 referendum.

"A Goddard Gunster employee told PRWeek: "the firm had some of its staff embedded in the Leave.EU office in London, and that 10 staff in the US were assigned to the account, while CEO Gerry Gunster regularly travelled to the UK. The agency has two offices in the US, plus London, Switzerland and Egypt bases."

On 14 December 2017, Goddard Gunster has confirmed it will change its name to Gunster Strategies Worldwide.

In May 2018 Leave.EU was fined £70,000 for breaches of UK election law in the referendum. According to BBC News: "[Leave.EU's] spending return did not include services [Leave.EU] had received from Goddard Gunster."

A year later, in May 2019, a report by Matt Frei for Channel 4 News in the UK stated that invoices showed Goddard Gunster billed Banks' company Southern Rock £108,684 for a party held in Nigel Farage's honour in July 2016 at the Hay-Adams Hotel, Washington DC. This included paying Fox News anchor Tucker Carlson £11,305.41 to interview Farage at the event.

Farage also had meetings with Republican Senator Bob Corker and US National Security Advisor, John Bolton at that year's Republican National Convention. The meetings were coordinated by Goddard Gunster.

== Yes California Independence Campaign ==
Yes California logo

Yes Scotland logo

The Yes California campaign borrows its name and logo from the Yes Scotland campaign of 2014.

In March 2017, the American Association of Political Consultants (AAPC) gave an "International Consultant of the Year" award to Farage and Leave.EU at Huntington Beach, California. While in Orange County, California, Farage and Banks attended GOP gatherings at Scott Baugh's invitation. Splitting California into two states was discussed at two of the gatherings. Afterwards The Washington Times and The Sunday Times, London reported that Baugh and Gerry Gunster were hiring Farage and Banks to help fundraise in California for the "Yes California Independence Campaign", a political action committee founded by Louis J. Marinelli, which is campaigning to split the state in two. Baugh denied the story saying he only, "asked Farage if he would be interested in talking to some of the county’s GOP movers and shakers.".

== Proposal for Goddard Gunster International ==
Channel 4 News reported that an e-mail from Gerry Gunster proposed building a new "political powerhouse", Goddard Gunster International, to provide “strategy, lobbying, creative services and paid advocacy to companies, organizations and individuals. With staff that are closely aligned with the new administration and with UK political leaders," with "counsel provided by Mr Nigel Farage". The proposal went on to suggest a 50/50 "division of profits" between Gerry Gunster and Arron Banks, with a "separate agreement with Nigel Farage". Gunster declined to provide a statement for the news item but claimed Channel 4 News′ information was "not credible".
