= Harry and Louise =

1993–94 American political ad campaign

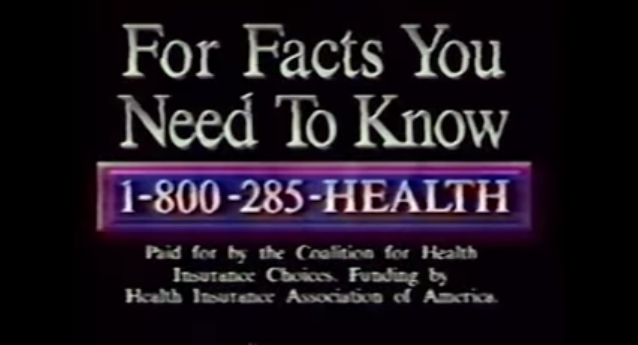
HIAA toll number; 1-800-285-HEALTH (displayed in a Harry and Louise ad)

"Harry and Louise" was a $14 to $20 million year-long television advertising campaign funded by the Health Insurance Association of America (HIAA) – a predecessor organization which merged into the AHIP – a health insurance industry lobby group, that ran intermittently from September 8, 1993, to September 1994 in opposition to the Clinton health care plan of 1993 and Congressional health care reform proposals in 1994. Fourteen television ads and radio and print advertising depicted a fictional suburban forty-something middle-class married couple, portrayed by actors Harry Johnson and Louise Caire Clark, despairing over bureaucratic and other aspects of health care reform plans and urging viewers to contact their representatives in Congress. The commercials were ordered by HIAA president Bill Gradison and HIAA executive vice president Chip Kahn, and created by California public relations consultants Ben Goddard and Rick Claussen of Goddard Claussen.

The couple returned in several newer advertisements pushing health care reform during the 2000 and 2004 presidential campaigns. In 2000, Harry and Louise appeared in a TV commercial sponsored by HIAA promoting its "InsureUSA" campaign advocating the need to provide health coverage to uninsured Americans.

Later, they returned in an unrelated 2002 ad, produced by Goddard Claussen Porter Novelli (Goddard Claussen was purchased by Porter Novelli in 1999), advocating human cloning for therapeutic purposes on behalf of CuresNow.org. The second ad was the subject of a lawsuit by the HIAA who claimed that they owned the characters, seeking an injunction to prevent the ad from airing; however, a court ruled that the rights to the characters were held by Goddard Claussen, and it aired during a showing of The West Wing on NBC.

The ad was one of several prominent political attack ads parodied in the 78th Academy Awards (2006). An older couple sitting at the kitchen table bemoans the "foreign-sounding names" of the best actress nominees, then praises Reese Witherspoon for having an all-American name.

Harry and Louise appeared again in an ad that premiered on August 25, 2008, during the 2008 Democratic National Convention, urging that health care reform be made a top priority. The ad aired again during the Republican National Convention. The 2008 ad was sponsored by several organizations that have, in the past, advocated diverse views on health care, including The American Cancer Society Cancer Action Network, the American Hospital Association, the Catholic Health Association, Families USA, and the National Federation of Independent Business.

In July 2009, the couple appeared in a new television advertisement in support of the health-care plan promoted by President Barack Obama. The ad was sponsored by a pharmaceutical industry trade group and Families USA.
