= Charles N. Kahn III =

American businessman (born 1952)

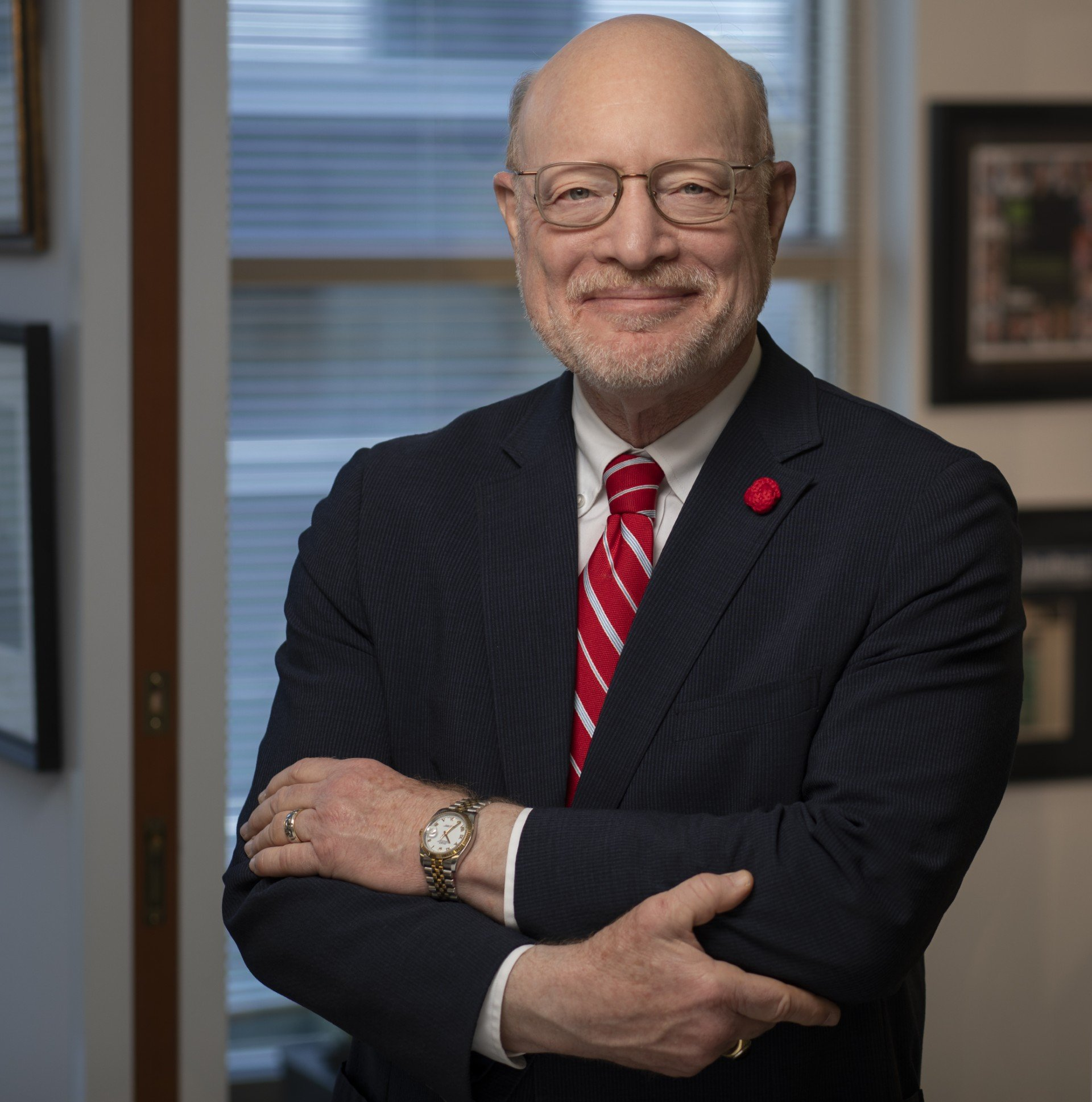
Charles Kahn

Charles N. ("Chip") Kahn III (born 1952 in New Orleans, Louisiana) is an American health policy expert who served as president and chief executive officer of the Federation of American Hospitals (FAH) from 2001 until his retirement on December 31, 2025. He is a visiting senior fellow at the American Enterprise Institute (AEI), a senior visiting fellow at KFF where he hosts the podcast KFF's Business of Health with Chip Kahn, and a nonresident senior scholar at the University of Southern California's Schaeffer Center for Health Policy & Economics.

== Early life and education ==
Kahn was born and grew up in New Orleans, Louisiana. He earned a BA in social and behavioral sciences from Johns Hopkins University and an MPH in health systems management from Tulane University's School of Public Health and Tropical Medicine.

== Career ==
As part of his graduate program, Kahn completed an administrative residency with the Teaching Hospital Department of the Association of American Medical Colleges. He then served as the director at the Office of Financial Management Education at the Association of University Programs in Health Administration. He later served as a senior health policy advisor to former senator David Durenberger (R-MN) and as legislative assistant for health to then-senator Dan Quayle (R-IN).

=== Political campaigning ===
Kahn's political campaign experience began as a high school student when he first met and worked for Newt Gingrich, then a Tulane University graduate student, and the Louisiana campaign director for the presidential campaign of Governor Nelson A. Rockefeller (R-NY). In 1969, Kahn served in what became the successful campaign for Maurice Edwin ("Moon") Landrieu, elected in 1970 as Mayor of New Orleans, and worked in Mayor Landrieu's Administration in 1975. In 1974 and 1976, Kahn managed Gingrich's first two campaigns for the U.S. House of Representatives.

=== Congressional support ===
From 1986 to 1993 and from 1995 to 1998, Kahn served the Health Subcommittee of the United States House of Representatives’ Ways and Means Committee, first as Minority Health Counsel and then as Staff Director. During this time he helped develop legislation such as the Health Insurance Portability and Accountability Act of 1996 (HIPAA) and the Balanced Budget Act of 1997. From 1993 to 1995 and from 1998 to 2001, Kahn held positions with the Health Insurance Association of America (HIAA), as Executive Vice President, Chief Operating Officer/President-Designate and President.

=== Health reform debates ===
During the Obama Administration's 2009–2010 health reform initiative, Kahn, as President and CEO of the Federation of American Hospitals, worked with leaders of the American Hospital Association and the Catholic Health Association of the United States in negotiating a hospital industry agreement with congressional leaders and the administration during the debate that preceded the Patient Protection and Affordable Care Act of 2010 (42 USC 18001). During the Clinton administration's 1993–1994 health reform initiative, Kahn was responsible for the Health Insurance Association of America’s "Harry and Louise" $14–20 million advertising/public affairs campaign, which opposed President Clinton’s healthcare proposal.

=== Quality measurement roles ===
Kahn served as co-chair of the Coordinating Committee of the National Quality Forum's (NQF) Measure Applications Partnership, which advised the Department of Health and Human Services on selecting measures for public report and performance-based payment programs and as a member of the NQF Governing Board.

Kahn was a founding principal of the Hospital Quality Alliance (HQA), a public-private collaboration that made comparative hospital quality information available through the federal Hospital Compare website.

=== Retirement and later career ===
In June 2025, Kahn announced that he would retire as FAH president and CEO effective December 31, 2025, after leading the organization for 24 years. He was succeeded by Charlene MacDonald, who had led the FAH's lobbying and public affairs operations and became CEO on January 1, 2026.

In 2026, Kahn joined the American Enterprise Institute as a visiting senior fellow, where his work focuses on health care policy and payment reform. He concurrently serves as a senior visiting fellow at KFF, where he hosts the podcast KFF's Business of Health with Chip Kahn, and as a nonresident senior scholar at the University of Southern California's Schaeffer Center for Health Policy & Economics. He is a founding member and co-chair of the Future of Health, an international collaborative of senior health care leaders.

Kahn has served as an adjunct professor of health policy and management at Tulane University since 2021, and has taught health policy at Johns Hopkins University, Tulane University, and George Washington University. His writing on health policy and performance measurement has appeared in journals including Health Affairs and NEJM Catalyst Innovations in Care Delivery.

== Recognition ==
Kahn has appeared on Modern Healthcare's annual "100 Most Influential People in Healthcare" list every year since 2022. The Hill listed Kahn among Washington, D.C.’s top lobbyists for 16 consecutive years.

He received Tulane University's Champion of Public Health Award in 2001, the B'nai B'rith National Healthcare Award in 2016, and the Tulane University School of Public Health and Tropical Medicine "Outstanding Alumni Award" in 2019.
